= List of Marathi-language authors =

This article contains a list of Marathi writers arranged in the English alphabetical order of the writers' last names.

- Gopal Ganesh Agarkar
- Satish Alekar
- Anant Sadashiv Altekar
- Malika Amar Sheikh
- Hari Narayan Apte
- Narayan Hari Apte
- Pralhad Keshav Atre
- Sarojini Babar
- Francis D'Britto
- Raja Badhe
- Baburao Bagul
- Bahinabai
- Bhalchandra Pandharinath Bahirat
- Vidya Bal
- Rajendra Banhatti
- Vasant Vaman Bapat
- Malati Vishram Bedekar
- Vishram Bedekar
- Vasudeo Sitaram Bendrey
- Durga Bhagwat
- Suresh Shridhar Bhat
- Purushottam Bhaskar Bhave
- Vinayak Narahari Bhave
- Vishnudas Bhave
- Subhash Bhende
- Balakrishna Bhagwant Borkar
- Vinayak Adinath Buwa
- Narayan Govind Chapekar
- Bahinabai Chaudhari
- Krushnashastri Chiplunkar
- Vishnushastri Krushnashastri Chiplunkar
- Maruti Chitampalli
- Dilip Purushottam Chitre
- Chokhamela
- Vaman Krushna Chorghade
- Vasant Abaji Dahake
- Jaywant Dalvi
- Hamid Dalwai
- Krishnaji Keshav Damle (Pen name: Keshavasuta)
- Gopal Nilkanth Dandekar
- Ramchandra Narayan Dandekar
- Mrunalini Desai
- Ranjit Desai
- Gopal Hari Deshmukh
- Sadanand Namdev Deshmukh
- Atmaram Ravaji Deshpande
- Gauri Deshpande
- Govind Purushottam Deshpande
- Kusumavati Deshpande
- Madhav Kashinath Deshpande
- Nagorao Ghanashyam Deshpande
- Purushottam Laxman Deshpande
- Purushottam Yashwant Deshpande
- Sunita Deshpande
- Govind Ballal Deval
- Narayan Dharap
- Namdeo Laxman Dhasal
- Aruna Ramchandra Dhere
- Ramchandra Chintamani Dhere
- Madhukar Vasudev Dhond
- Raghunath Vaman Dighe
- Muktabai Dixit
- Dnyaneshwar
- Mahesh Elkunchwar
- Eknath
- Gangadhar Gopal Gadgil
- Narahar Vishnu Gadgil
- Ram Ganesh Gadkari
- Saraswati Gangadhar
- Viththal Dattatreya Ghate
- Mangala Godbole
- Dattatraya Ganesh Godse
- Vishnubhat Godse
- Mandakini Gogate
- Arvind Gokhale
- Vidyadhar S. Gokhale
- Padma Gole
- Narayan Ganesh Gore
- Ramchandra Bhikaji Gunjikar
- Madhukar Dattatreya Hatakananglekar
- Nagnath S. Inamdar
- R. G. Jadhav
- Balshastri Jambhekar
- Janabai
- Shankar Dattatraya Javdekar
- Ramchandra Shripad Jog
- Chintaman Vinayak Joshi
- Laxmanshastri Balaji Joshi
- Mahadevshastri Joshi
- Shrikrishna Janardan Joshi
- Shripad Raghunath Joshi
- Vaman Gopal Joshi
- Vaman Malhar Joshi
- Baba Kadam
- Vasant Purushottam Kale
- Dattatreya Balkrushna Kalelkar
- Narayan Govind Kalelkar
- Pandurang Vaman Kane
- Anant Kanekar
- Shirish Kanekar
- Vasant Shankar Kanetkar
- Kanhopatra
- Kashibai Kanitkar
- Shakuntala Karandikar
- Vinayak Janardan Karandikar
- Govind Vinayak Karandikar
- Madhu Mangesh Karnik
- Irawati Karve
- Dattatray Raghunath Kavthekar
- Madhukar Keche
- Anant Viththal Keer (Pen name: Dhananjay Keer)
- Girija Keer
- Ashok Ramchandra Kelkar
- Diwakar Krushna Kelkar
- Girijabai Kelkar
- Narasimha Chintaman Kelkar
- Shridhar Venkatesh Ketkar
- Krushnaji Prabhakar Khadilkar
- D. P. Khambete
- Vishnu Sakharam Khandekar
- Chintamani Tryambak Khanolkar
- Shankar Ramchandra Kharat
- Jagadish Khebudkar
- Madhav Vinayak Kibe
- Balwant Pandurang Kirloskar
- Arun Balkrishna Kolatkar
- Shripad Krushna Kolhatkar
- Vishnu Bhikaji Kolte
- Nagnath Lalujirao Kottapalle
- Sumati Kshetramade
- Shrikrushna Keshav Kshirsagar
- Anjali Kulkarni
- Krushnaji Pandurang Kulkarni
- Gurunath Abaji Kulkarni
- Waman Lakshman Kulkarni
- Gora Kumbhar
- Gajanan Digambar Madgulkar
- Vyankatesh Digambar Madgulkar
- Gajanan Tryambak Madkholkar
- Vishnu Moreshwar Mahajani
- Mahipati
- Laxman Bapu Mane
- Ramesh Mantri
- Bal Sitaram Mardhekar
- Shripad Mahadev Mate
- Ratnakar Ramkrushna Matkari
- Keshav Tanaji Meshram
- Dattaram Maruti Mirasdar
- Vasudev Vishnu Mirashi
- Muktabai
- Sharchchandra Muktibodh
- Mukundraj
- Vasanti Muzumdar
- Namdev
- Bhalchandra Nemade* Manohar Shankar Oak
- Mangesh Keshav Padgaonkar
- Prabhakar Narayan Padhye
- Setu Madhavrao Pagdi
- Shirish Pai
- Bhawanrao Shriniwasrao Pant Pratinidhi
- Moropant RamjI Paradkar
- Shivram Mahadev Paranjape
- Dattatray Balwant Parasnis
- V. S. Pargaonkar
- R. B. Patankar
- Yusufkhan Mohamadkhan Pathan
- Shankar Babaji Patil
- Vishwas Mahipati Patil
- Vasudha Patil
- Madhav Trimbak Patwardhan (Pen name: Madhav Julian)
- Daya Pawar
- Pradnya Daya Pawar
- Urmila Pawar
- Yashwant Dinkar Pendharkar
- Shankar Damodar Pendse
- Shripad Narayan Pendse
- Narayan Sitaram Phadke
- Yashawant Dinkar Phadke
- Narahar Raghunath Phatak
- Vasant Narhar Phene
- Jyotiba Phule
- Ravindra Pinge
- Dwarkanath Madhav Pitale
- Datto Vaman Potdar
- Babasaheb Purandare
- Keshav Jagannath Purohit
- Raghunath Pandit
- Vijaya Rajadhyaksha
- Vishwanath Kashinath Rajwade
- Ramdas
- Mahadev Govind Ranade
- Purushottam Shivaram Rege
- Vasant Sabnis
- Arun Sadhu
- Bal Gangadhar Samant
- Geeta Janardan Sane
- Pandurang Sadashiv Sane
- Indira Sant
- Vilas Sarang
- Gangadhar Balkrushna Sardar
- Govind Sakharam Sardesai
- Annabhau Sathe
- Vinayak Damodar Savarkar
- Shivaji Sawant
- Tryambak Shankar Shejwalkar
- Shanta Janardan Shelke
- Ram Balkrushna Shewalkar
- F. M. Shinde
- Vishnu Vaman Shirwadkar (Pen name: Kusumagraj)
- Narayan Gangaram Surve
- Bhaskar Ramchandra Tambe
- Priya Tendulkar
- Vijay Dhondo Tendulkar
- Yadunath Dattatray Thatte
- Tryambak Bapuji Thombre (Pen name: Balkavi)
- Bal Gangadhar Tilak
- Lakshmibai Tilak
- Sant Tukaram
- Chintaman Vinayak Vaidya
- Sarojini Vaidya
- Bhargavaram Viththal Varerkar
- Datta Walvekar
- Anand Ratan Yadav
- Satish Kalsekar
- Manik Sitaram Godghate (Pen name : Grace)
- Kamal Desai
- Nanda Khare
- Jagdish Kadam
