= Pune Aitihasik Vastu Smriti =

Historical society in Pune, India

The Pune Aitihasik Vastu Smriti (Marathi: पुणे ऐतिहासिक वास्तू स्मृती; lit. transl. Pune Historical Architecture Memory) is an historical society established under the Lokmanya Tilak Smarak Trust on 5 November 1995, in Pune, Maharashtra in India.

Between 1995 and 2004, the society installed numerous commemorative plaques honouring individuals important to the history of Pune and the culture of Maharashtra. The plaques are installed posthumously, usually outside the honoured individual's residence during their lifetime. The founder of the society, Jayant Shridhar Tilak, modelled it after English Heritage, and their installation of blue plaques across Greater London.

The society further published a guide book-cum-biographical dictionary under the label of Pune Heritage in two volumes, in 1996 and 2004. The volumes detail the location of every blue plaque across Pune, and include biographies of the individuals honoured dually in English and Marathi.

The first plaque installed was that of writer Shivram Mahadev Paranjape in November 1995, where as the 100th plaque installed was that of humorist Purushottam Laxman Deshpande in February 2004. In 2010, several more plaques were inaugurated for Maharashtra Day. By 2020, there were a total of 135 plaques which had been installed, however they were poorly maintained.

== List of plaques ==
Honouree	Date
Shivram Mahadev Paranjape	12 November 1995
Hirabai Barodekar	20 November 1995
Shripad Mahadev Mate	26 November 1995
Baburao Ganapatrao Jagtap	3 December 1995
Gopal Vinayak Bhonde	10 December 1995
Krishnarao Phulambrikar	17 December 1995
Vitthal Ramji Shinde	24 December 1995
Kerunana Chhatre	31 December 1995
D. B. Deodhar	7 January 1996
Hari Narayan Apte	14 January 1996
Damodar Gangaram Dhotre	21 January 1996
Dhananjay Ramchandra Gadgil	28 January 1996
D. B. Limaye	4 February 1996
Annasaheb Patwardhan	11 February 1996
Vasudev Balwant Phadke	18 February 1996
V. B. Gogate	26 February 1996
Gopal Hari Deshmukh	3 March 1996
Abasaheb Mujumdar	9 March 1996
Ramabai Ranade	24 March 1996
Raghunath Shastri Patwardhan	31 March 1996
Deenanath Mangeshkar	7 April 1996
Bal Gangadhar Tilak	23 June 1996
Gopal Ganesh Agarkar	23 June 1996
Vaman Shivram Apte	23 June 1996
D. R. Bendre	30 June 1996
Shankar Vaman Dandekar	30 June 1996
Ganpat Mahadev Nalawade	14 July 1996
Datto Vaman Potdar	6 October 1996
Narasimha Chintaman Kelkar	14 October 1996
Popatlal Shah	20 October 1996
R. P. Paranjpye	27 October 1996
L. B. Bhopatkar	3 November 1996
Gopal Krishna Gokhale	17 November 1996
Shivrampant Damle	24 November 1996
Madhav Julian	29 November 1996
G. D. Madgulkar	24 December 1996
Jyotirao Phule	3 January 1997
Narayan Sitaram Phadke	19 January 1997
Bhaskarbuwa Bakhale	2 February 1997
Bal Gandharva	9 February 1997
Kashibai Kanitkar	12 March 1997
Pralhad Keshav Atre	16 March 1997
Shridhar Venkatesh Ketkar	19 March 1997
Shripad Krishna Belvalkar	25 May 1997
M. R. Jayakar	20 July 1997
P. N. Rajbhoj	27 July 1997
S. L. Kirloskar	3 August 1997
Chapekar brothers	10 August 1997
Krishnarao Gangurde	18 August 1997
Keshav Vaman Bhole	24 August 1997
Ramkrishnabuwa Vaze	31 August 1997
Anandi Gopal Joshi	28 September 1997
Shankarrao More	12 October 1997
Vinayakrao Patwardhan	9 December 1997
Nanasaheb Phatak	23 August 1998
Nana Maharaj Sakhare	13 September 1998
Anant Vishnu Damle	13 September 1998
Shaikh Fattelal Yasin Mistri	13 September 1998
V. Shantaram	4 October 1998
Dhondo Keshav Karve	9 November 1998
Anandi Karve	9 November 1998
Raghunath Damodar Khanivale	26 November 1998
Mahadev Govind Ranade	29 November 1998
H. V. Tulpule	3 January 1999
Yashwant Dinkar Pendharkar	31 January 1999
Shankar Keshav Kanetkar	31 January 1999
Shridhar Balkrishna Ranade	31 January 1999
Mahadev Ballal Namjoshi	21 February 1999
P. G. Sahasrabuddhe	14 March 1999
Shankar Shyamji Gaikwad	28 March 1999
Vasukaka Joshi	18 April 1999
Ganesh Krishna Gadre	18 April 1999
Kusumagraj	6 June 1999
Krushnashastri Chiplunkar	30 July 1999
Vishnushastri Krushnashastri Chiplunkar	30 July 1999
B. M. Gupte	29 August 1999
Vasudev Shastri Mahadev Abhyankar	22 November 1999
Kashinath Vasudev Abhyankar	22 November 1999
Nilkanth Shankar Navare	28 November 1999
Bhargavram Achrekar	23 March 2000
Pandita Ramabai	7 May 2000
Baba Padmanji	7 May 2000
Vasudeo Sitaram Bendrey	16 July 2000
G. S. Mahajani	27 August 2000
Balakrishna Bhagwant Borkar	8 October 2000
Ganesh Shastri Joshi	20 October 2000
Narayan Govind Chapekar	25 February 2001
Gangadhar Balkrushna Sardar	1 April 2001
Viththal Dattatreya Ghate	7 May 2001
R. S. Jog	15 May 2001
Shripad Dattatraya Deshpande	2 July 2001
Vishnubuwa Jog	5 July 2001
Y. G. Joshi	26 August 2001
Shreedhar Mahadev Joshi	12 November 2001
Raghunath Keshav Khadilkar	16 December 2001
Chintaman Vinayak Joshi	6 January 2002
Narayan Ganesh Gore	17 February 2002
C. Ramchandra	2 June 2002
Chhota Gandharva	7 July 2002
Walchand Ramchand Kothari	14 July 2002
Dadasaheb Torne	15 September 2002
Sadashiv Govind Barve	22 December 2002
Sadashiv Vinayak Bapat	2 February 2003
Vishram Bedekar	16 February 2003
Malati Bedekar	16 February 2003
Vaman Dattatreya Gulwani	30 March 2003
Makrand Govind Bhave	7 December 2003
Vasantrao Deshpande	14 December 2003
Shahu Modak	11 January 2004
Chandrashekhar Agashe	18 January 2004
Purushottam Laxman Deshpande	29 February 2004

== Publications ==
- Lokmanya Tilak Smarak Trust (1 August 1996). पुणे ऐतिहासिक वास्तू स्मृती : नीलफलक मार्गदर्शिका [Pune Heritage : Blue Plaque Guide] (in Marathi and English). Vol. I. J. S. Tilak, chairman; Sarang Sathe, plaque producer; V. K. Mehendale, treasurer; M. S. Dixit, secretary. Pune: Kesari.
- Lokmanya Tilak Smarak Trust (29 February 2004). पुणे ऐतिहासिक वास्तू स्मृती : नीलफलक मार्गदर्शिका [Pune Heritage : Blue Plaque Guide] (in Marathi and English). Vol. II. M. S. Dixit, president; P. S. Palande, vice president; V. K. Mehendale, treasurer; V. R. Gokhale, secretary; V. S. Pingale, secretary. Pune: Kesari.

== Gallery ==
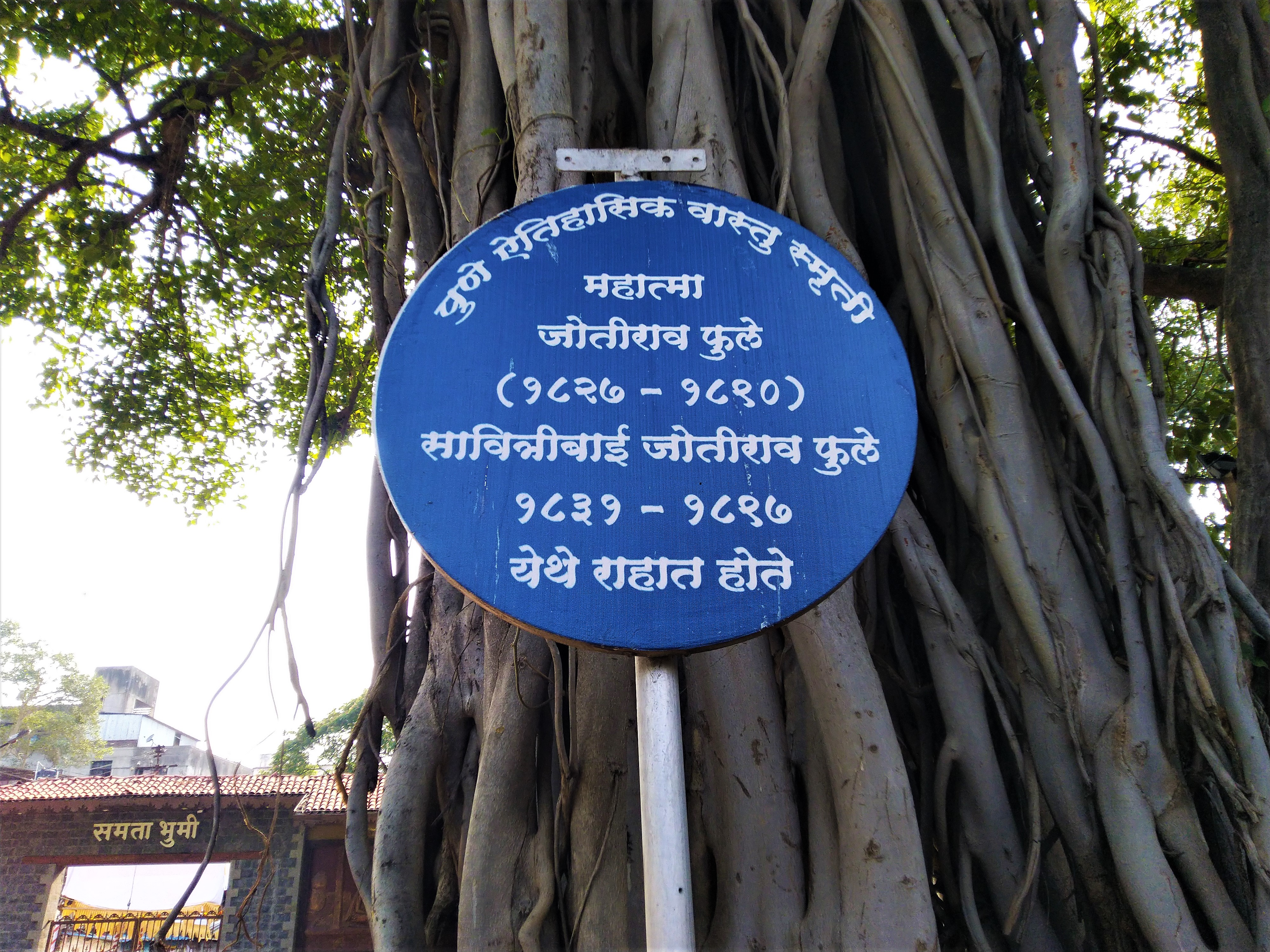
Jyotirao Phule

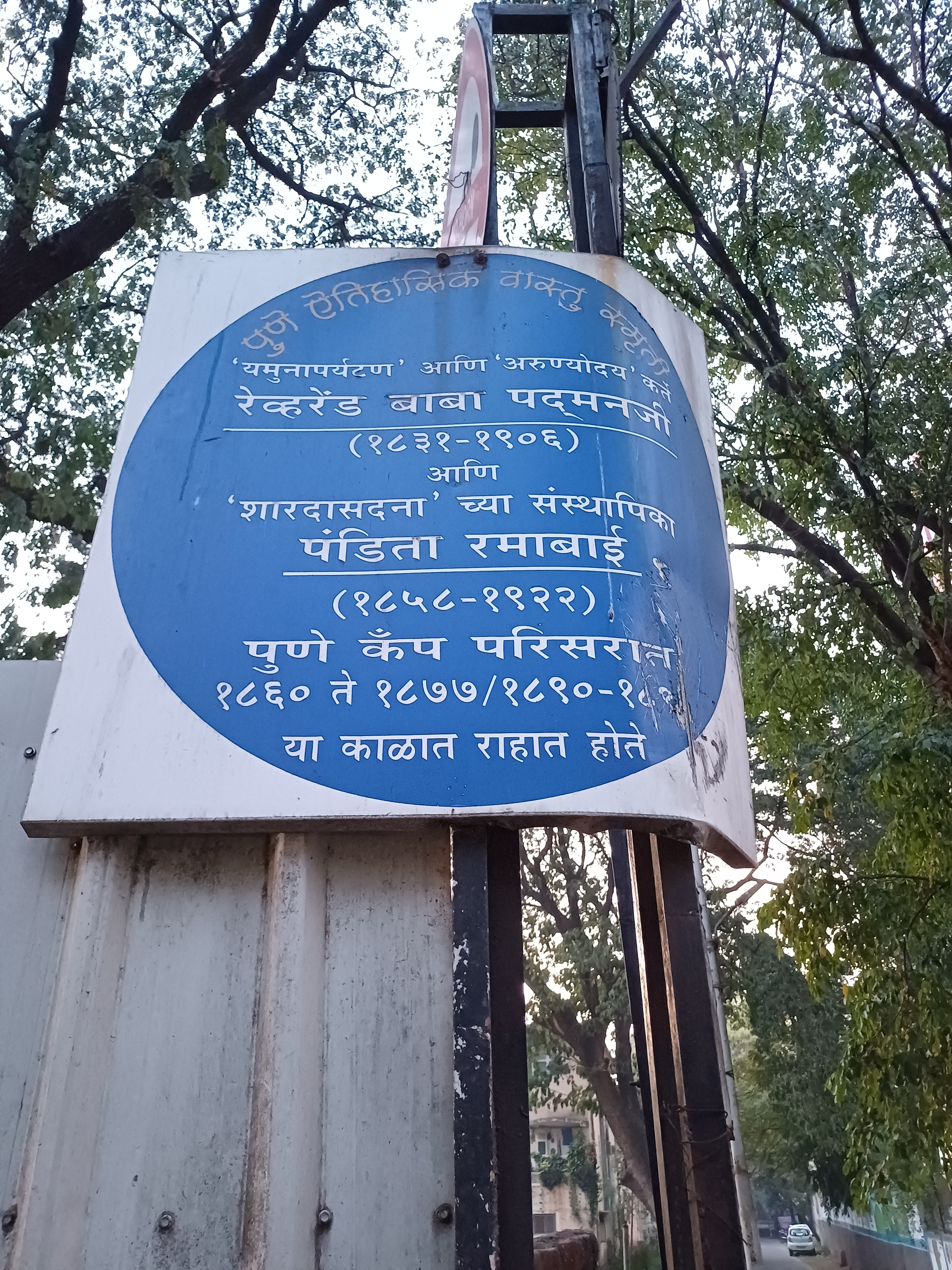
Baba Padmanji and Pandita Ramabai

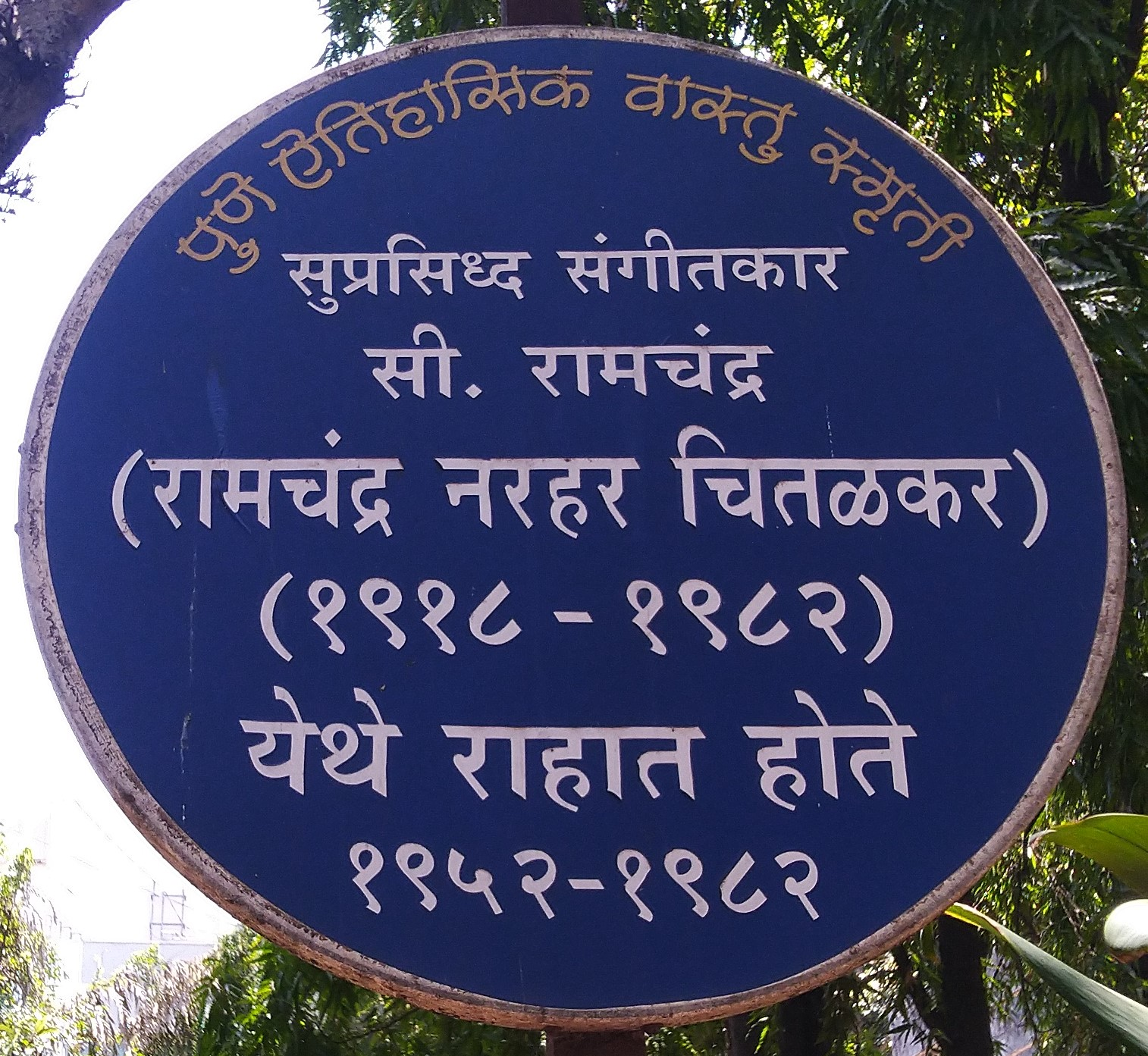
C. Ramchandra

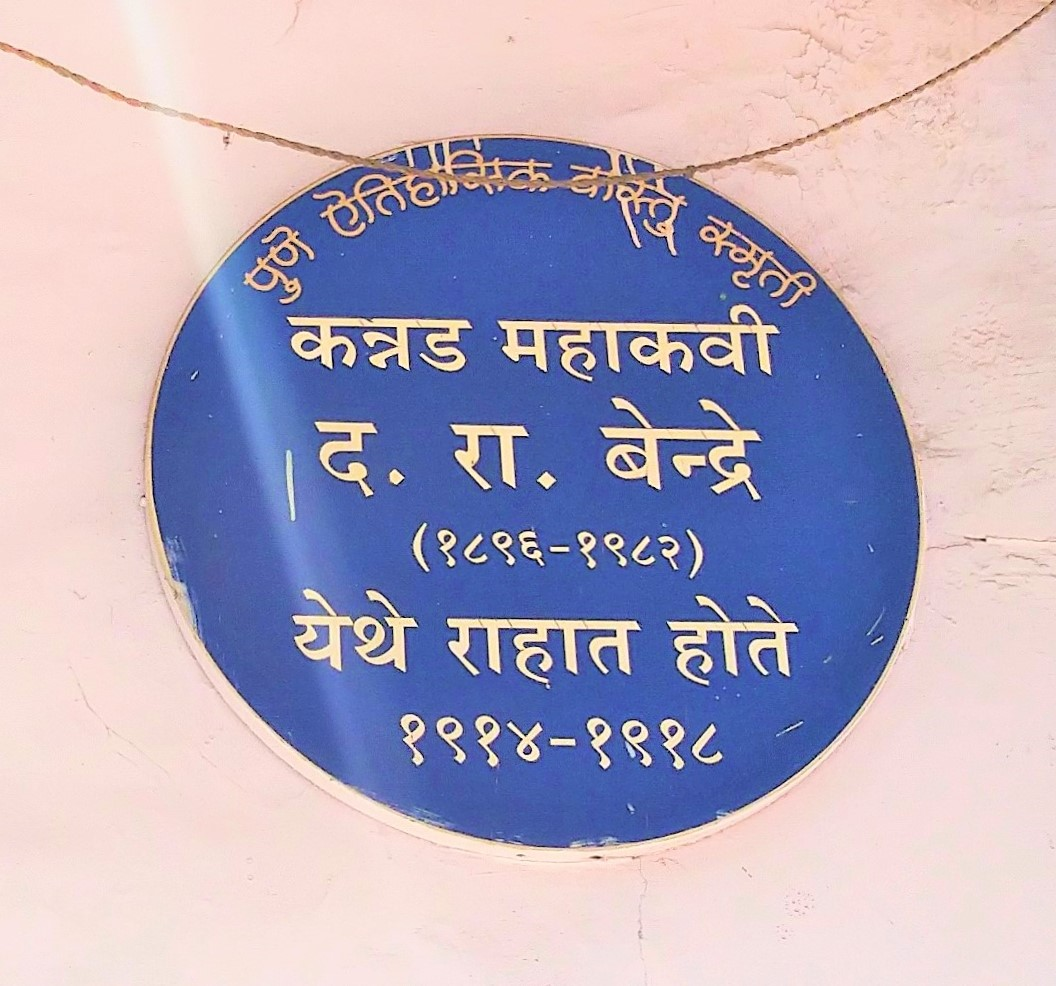
D. R. Bendre

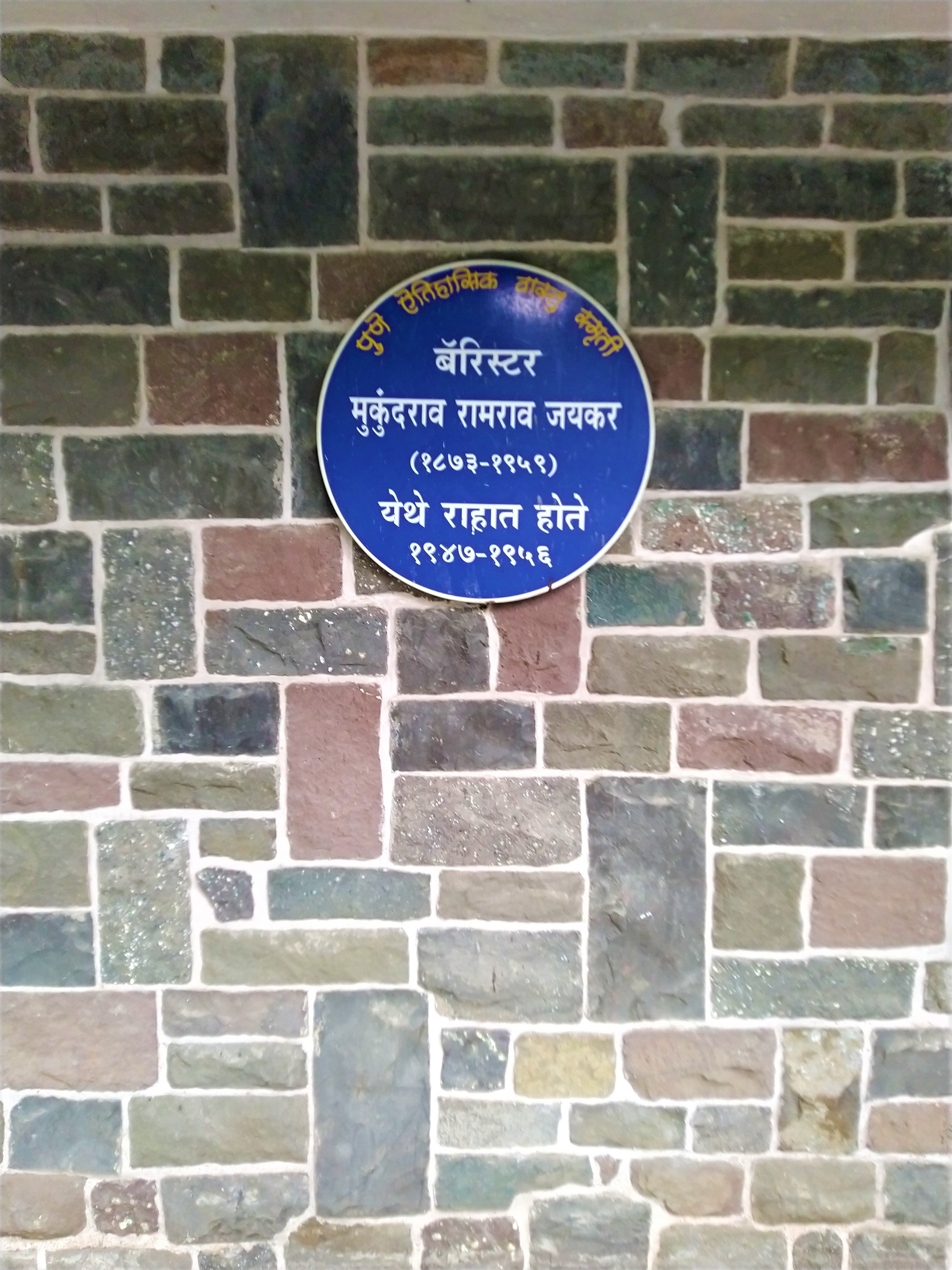
M. R. Jayakar

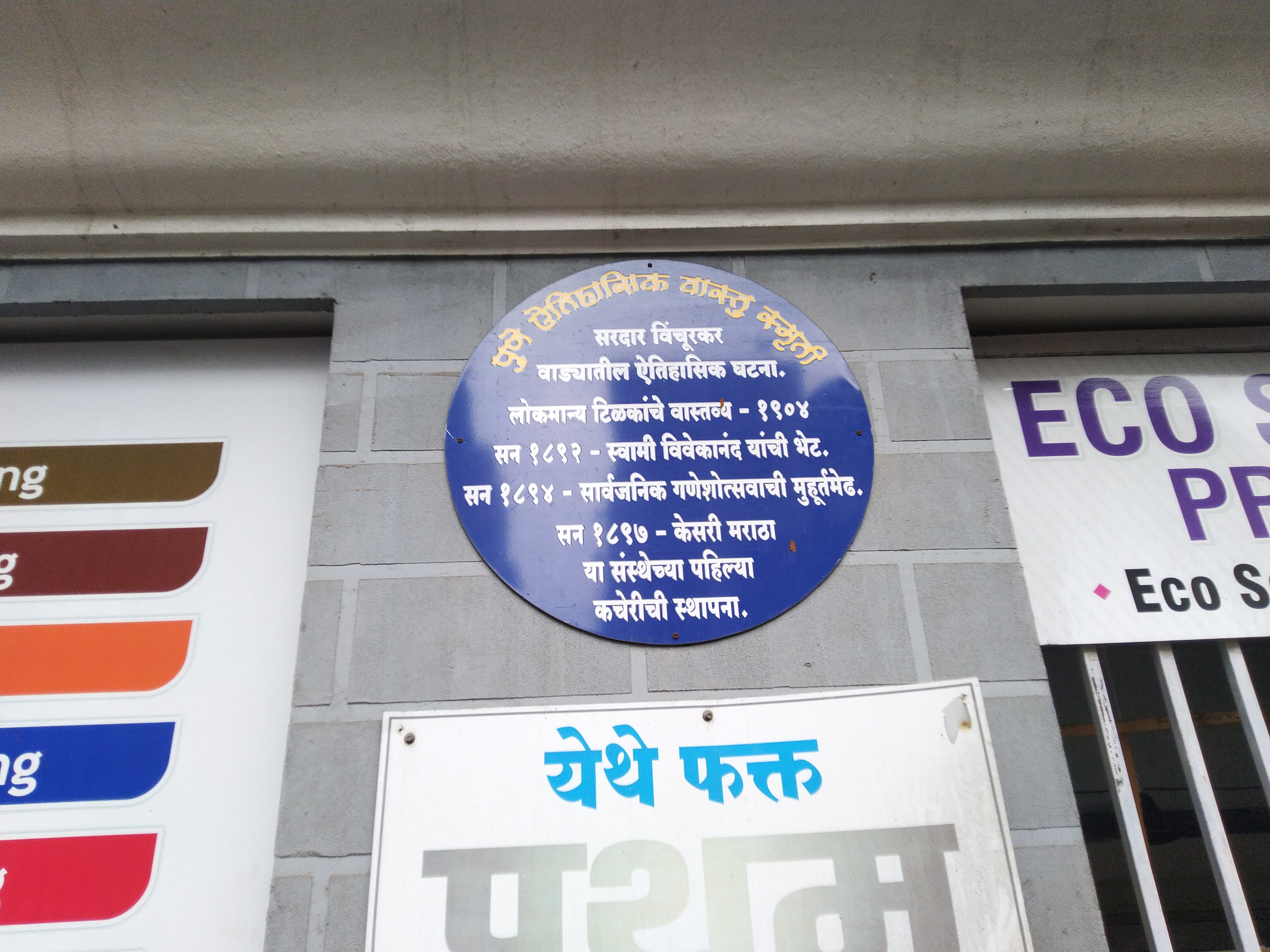
Vinchurkar family

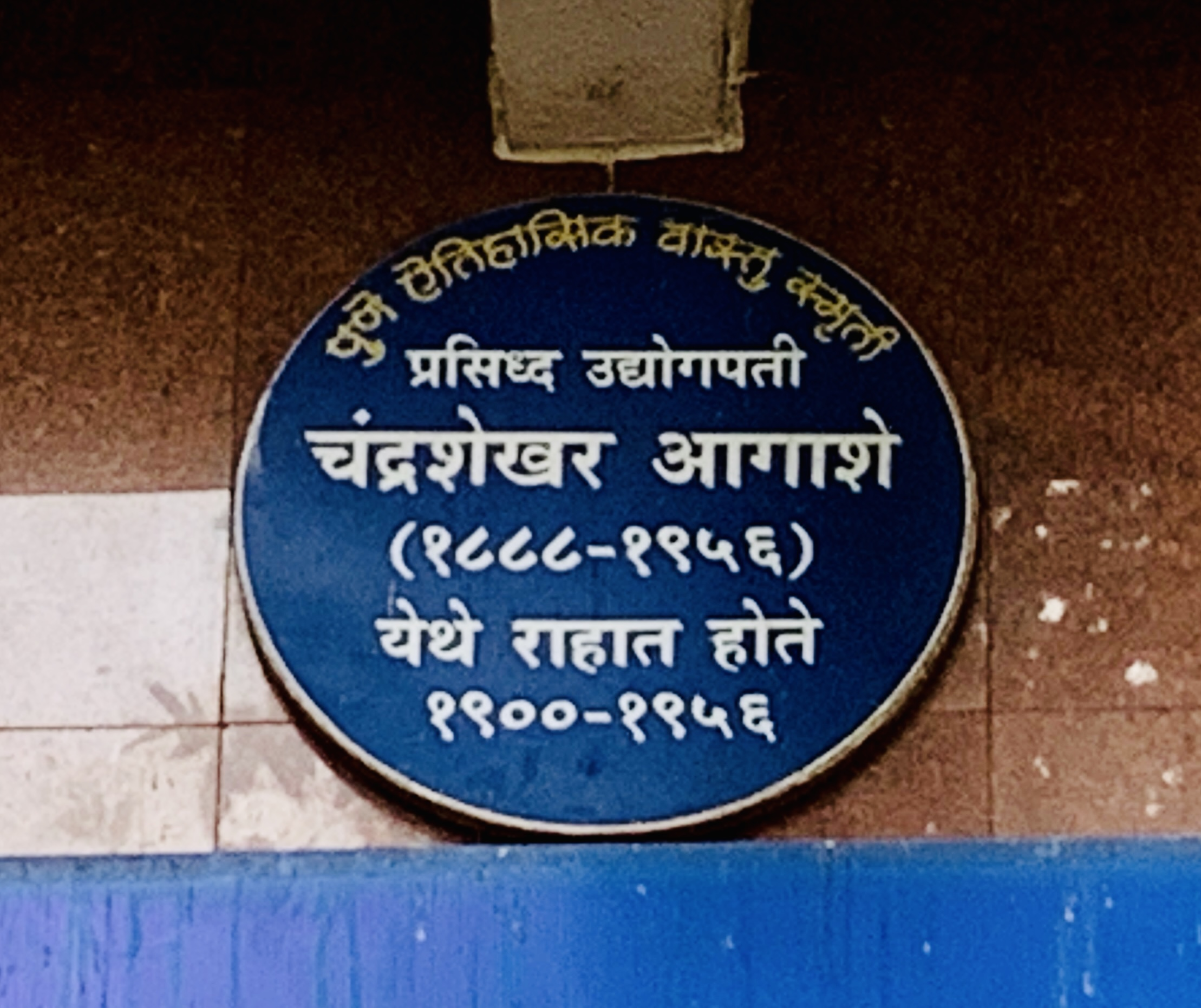
Chandrashekhar Agashe
