= Bhikaji =

Bhikaji may refer to:

== People ==
- Ganesh Bhikaji Deolalikar (1895-1978), Indian architect
- Ramchandra Bhikaji Gunjikar (1843–1901), Marathi writer
- Vishnu Bhikaji Kolte (1908–1998), Marathi writer
- Dattatraya Bhikaji Kulkarni (1934-2016), Marathi writer

== Other uses ==
- Bhikaji Cama Place metro station, metro station in India
