= Shripad Krushna Kolhatkar =

Marathi writer

- Born: 29 June 1871; Buldhana, Berar Province, British India
- Died: 1 June 1934 (aged 62)
- Education: Deccan College (Law)
- Known for: Sukha Malika; Mukanayak (Play)

Shripad Krushna Kolhatkar (1871 – 1934) was a Marathi writer from Bombay Presidency, British India.

He was born on 29 June 1871, in Buldhana. While in high school, he wrote a play named Sukha Malika (सुखमालिका). During his high school years and, later, college years, he widely read both English and Marathi literature, the latter particularly including Vishnushastri Krushnashastri Chiplunkar's Nibandhamala (निबंधमाला).

According to the social custom of his times, Kolhatkar's family arranged his marriage when he was 14. At age 17, he finished his high school education and joined Deccan College in Pune to receive his bachelor's degree in 1891. After obtaining a law degree in 1897, he started his law practice in Akola and then Jalgaon Jamod.

Kolhatkar was a pioneer in the field of humor as well as literary criticism in Marathi. He wrote a 110-page critique on the play Totayache Banda (तोतयाचे बंड) of Narasimha Chintaman Kelkar, which included his thoughts on the art of writing plays, and he wrote a 135-page critique on the novel Ragini (रागिणी) of Vaman Malhar Joshi, which included his thoughts on the art of writing novels.

Kolhatkar also wrote 12 plays; poems; short stories; and novels. Besides entertaining readers, bringing about social reform was an important objective of Kolhatkar's writings. Writers Ram Ganesh Gadkari, Vishnu Sakharam Khandekar, Gajanan Tryambak Madkholkar, Mama Warerkar, and Pralhad Keshav Atre honored him as their guru.

He presided over Akhil Bharatiya Marathi Sahitya Sammelan held in Pune in 1913.

== Literary work ==
- Sahitya Battishi : Sudamyache Pohe (साहित्यबत्तिशी : सुदाम्याचे पोहे) (Collection of humorous articles)
- Sham Sundar (शामसुंदर) (Novel)
- Shiva Pavitrya (शिवपावित्र्य) (Play)
- Vir Tanaya (वीरतनय) (Play)
- Mukanayak (मूकनायक) (Play)
- Vadhu Pariksha (वधूपरीक्षा) (Play)
- Sahacharini (सहचारिणी) (Play)
- Mati Vikar (मतिविकार) (Play)
- Gupta Manjush (गुप्तमंजूष) (Play)
- Parivartan (परिवर्तन) (Play)
- Janma Rahasya (जन्मरहस्य) (Play)
- Prema Shodhan (प्रेमशोधन) (Play)
- Shrama Saphalya (श्रमसाफल्य) (Play)
- Maya Vivaha (मायाविवाह) (Play)
- Sudamyache Pohe (सुदाम्याचे पोहे) (Book)
