= Akhil Bharatiya Marathi Sahitya Sammelan =

Annual Conference for literary discussions

Akhil Bharatiya Marathi Sahitya Sammelan अखिल भारतीय मराठी साहित्य संमेलन
- Frequency: Annually
- Country: India
- Most recent: 99th Marathi Sahitya Sammelan
- Organiser: Akhil Bharatiya Marathi Sahitya Mahamandal
- Focus: Marathi language; Marathi literature; Marathi culture

Akhil Bharatiya Marathi Sahitya Sammelan (All India Marathi Literary Conference) is an annual conference for literary discussions by Marathi writers. Marathi is the official language of Maharashtra State. The first Marathi Sahitya Sammelan was held in Pune in 1878 under the chairmanship of Justice Mahadev Govind Ranade.

== Conferences held ==
Following is the list of the conferences with year and venue:

Edition	Year	Location	President
1st	1878	Pune	Mahadev Govind Ranade
-	1879–1884	No Conference	
2nd	1885	Pune	Krushna Shastri Rajwade
	1886–1904	No Conference	
3rd	1905	Satara	Raghunath Pandurang Karandikar
4th	1906	Pune	Govind Vaman Kanitkar
5th	1907	Pune	Vishnu Moreshwar Mahajani
6th	1908	Pune	Chintaman Vinayak Vaidya
7th	1909	Vadodara	Kanhoba Ranchhodadas Kirtikar
-	1910–1911	No Conference	
8th	1912	Akola	Hari Narayan Apte
-	1913–1914	No Conference	
9th	1915	Mumbai	Gangadhar Patwardhan
-	1916	No Conference	
10th	1917	Indore	Ganesh Janardan Agashe
-	1918–1920	No Conference	
11th	1921	Vadodara	Narasimha Chintaman Kelkar
-	1922–1925	No Conference	
12th	1926	Mumbai	Madhav Vinayak Kibe
13th	1927	Pune	Shripad Krushna Kolhatkar
14th	1928	Gwalior	Madhav Shrihari Aney
15th	1929	Belgaum	Shivram Mahadev Paranjape
16th	1930	Margao	Vaman Malhar Joshi
17th	1931	Hyderabad	Shridhar Venkatesh Ketkar
18th	1932	Kolhapur	Sayajirao Gaekwad III
19th	1933	Nagpur	Krushnaji Prabhakar Khadilkar
20th	1934	Vadodara	Narayan Govind Chapekar
21st	1935	Indore	Bhawanrao Shriniwasrao Pant Pratinidhi
22nd	1936	Jalgaon	Madhav Trimbak Patwardhan
-	1937	No Conference	
23rd	1938	Mumbai	Vinayak Damodar Savarkar
24th	1939	Ahmednagar	Datto Vaman Potdar
25th	1940	Ratnagiri	Narayan Sitaram Phadke
26th	1941	Solapur	Vishnu Sakharam Khandekar
27th	1942	Nashik	Pralhad Keshav Atre
28th	1943	Sangli	Shripad Mahadev Mate
29th	1944	Dhule	Bhargavaram Vitthal Warerkar
-	1945	No Conference	
30th	1946	Belgaum	Gajanan Tryambak Madkholkar
31st	1947	Hyderabad	Narahar Raghunath Phatak
-	1948	No Conference	
32nd	1949	Pune	Shankar Dattatraya Javdekar
33rd	1950	Mumbai	Yashwant Dinkar Pendharkar
34th	1951	Karwar	Anant Priolkar
35th	1952	Amalner	Krushnaji Pandurang Kulkarni
36th	1953	Ahmedabad	Viththal Dattatreya Ghate
37th	1954	Delhi	Lakshman Shastri Joshi
38th	1955	Pandharpur	Shankar Damodar Pendse
-	1956	No Conference	
39th	1957	Aurangabad	Anant Atmaram Kanekar
40th	1958	Malvan	Atmaram Ravaji Deshpande
41st	1959	Miraj	Shrikrushna Keshav Kshirsagar
42nd	1960	Thane	Ramchandra Shripad Jog
43rd	1961	Gwalior	Kusumavati Deshpande
44th	1962	Satara	Narhar Vishnu Gadgil
-	1963	No Conference	
45th	1964	Margao	Vishnu Vaman Shirwadkar
46th	1965	Hyderabad	Waman Lakshman Kulkarni
-	1966	No Conference	
47th	1967	Bhopal	Vishnu Bhikaji Kolte
-	1968	No Conference	
48th	1969	Wardha	Purushottam Shivaram Rege
-	1970–1972	No Conference	
49th	1973	Yavatmal	Gajanan Digambar Madgulkar
50th	1974	Ichalkaranji	Purushottam Laxman Deshpande
51st	1975	Karad	Durga Bhagwat
-	1976	No Conference	
52nd	1977	Pune	Purushottam Bhaskar Bhave
-	1978	No Conference	
53rd	1979	Chandrapur	Vaman Krushna Chorghade
54th	1980	Barshi	Gangadhar Balkrushna Sardar
55th	1981 (February)	Akola	Gopal Nilkanth Dandekar
56th	1981 (December)	Raipur	Gangadhar Gopal Gadgil
57th	1983	Ambejogai	Vyankatesh Madgulkar
58th	1984	Jalgaon	Shankarrao Kharat
59th	1985	Nanded	Shankar Babaji Patil
60th	1986	Mumbai	Vishram Bedekar
-	1987	No Conference	
61st	1988	Thane	Vasant Kanetkar
62nd	1989	Amravati	Keshav Jagannath Purohit
63rd	1990 (January)	Pune	Yusufkhan Mohamadkhan Pathan
64th	1990 (December)	Ratnagiri	Madhu Mangesh Karnik
65th	1992	Kolhapur	Ramesh Mantri
66th	1993	Satara	Vidyadhar Gokhale
67th	1994	Panaji	Ram Balkrushna Shewalkar
68th	1995	Parbhani	Narayan Gangaram Surve
69th	1996	Alandi	Shanta Shelke
70th	1997	Ahmednagar	Nagnath S. Inamdar
71st	1998	Parali Vaijnath	Dattaram Maruti Mirasdar
72nd	1999	Mumbai	Vasant Bapat
73rd	2000	Belgaum	Yashawant Dinkar Phadke
74th	2001	Indore	Vijaya Rajadhyaksha
75th	2002	Pune	Rajendra Banhatti
76th	2003	Karad	Subhash Bhende
77th	2004	Aurangabad	R. G. Jadhav
78th	2005	Nashik	Keshav Tanaji Meshram
79th	2006	Solapur	Maruti Chitampalli
80th	2007	Nagpur	Arun Sadhu
81st	2008	Sangli	Madhukar Dattatreya Hatakananglekar
82nd	2009	Mahabaleshwar	Anand Ratan Yadav
83rd	2010	Pune	Dattatraya Bhikaji Kulkarni
84th	2011	Thane	Uttam Kamble
85th	2012	Chandrapur	Vasant Abaji Dahake
86th	2013	Chiplun	Nagnath Lalujirao Kottapalle
87th	2014	Saswad	F. M. Shinde
88th	2015	Ghuman, Punjab	Sadanand More
89th	2016	Pimpri-Chinchwad	Dr. Shripal Sabnis
90th	2017	Dombivli	Akshaykumar Kale
91st	2018	Baroda	Lakshmikant Deshmukh
92nd	2019	Yavatmal	Aruna Ramchandra Dhere
93rd	2020	Osmanabad	Francis D'Britto
94th	2021	Nashik	Jayant Narlikar
95th	2022	Udgir	Bharat Sasane
96th	2023	Wardha	Justice (Retd.) Narendra Chapalgaokar
97th	2024	Amalner	Ravindra Shobhane
98th	2025	Delhi	Dr Tara Bhawalkar
99th	2026	Satara	Vishwas Patil

== Women presidents ==
Only six women have been the presidents of the Sammelan to date:

Year	Location	President
1961	Gwalior	Kusumavati Deshpande
1975	Karad	Durga Bhagwat
1996	Alandi	Shanta Shelke
2001	Indore	Vijaya Rajadhyaksha
2019	Yavatmal	Aruna Ramchandra Dhere
2025	Delhi	Dr. Tara Bhavalkar
