= Atmaram Ravaji Deshpande =

Marathi poet (1901–1982)

Atmaram Raoji Deshpande
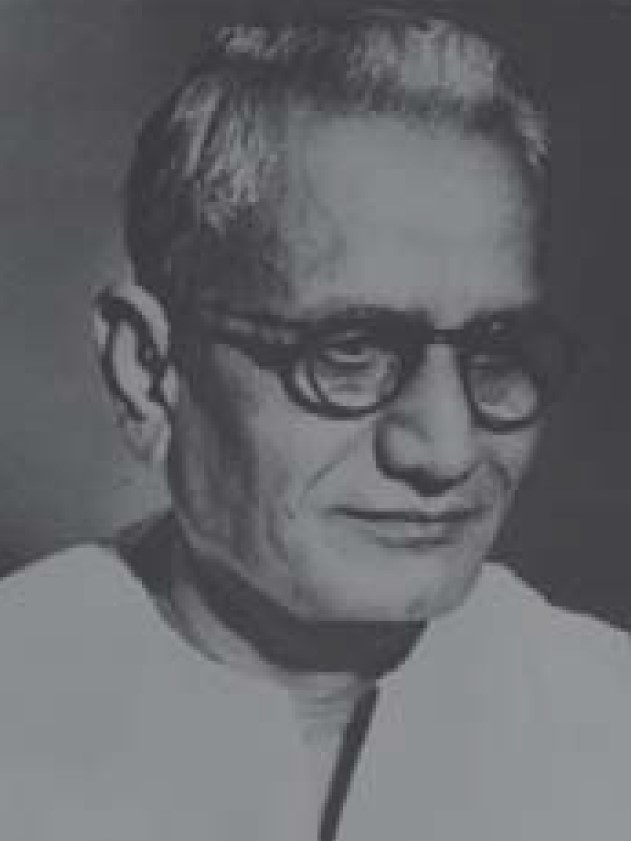
- Born: 11 September 1901; Murtijapur, Akola district, Berar Province
- Died: 8 May 1982 (aged 80)
- Occupation: Marathi Poet
- Spouse(s): Kusumavati Deshpande, Marathi Writer
- Writing career
- Pen name: Kavi Anil
- Language: Marathi
- Notable awards: Sahitya Akademi Award, 1977; Sahitya Akademi Fellowship in 1979
- Literary movement: free style -Muktachhand (मुक्तछंद) - poetry to Marathi literature

Atmaram Raoji Deshpande (11 September 1901 – 8 May 1982) was a Marathi poet from Vidarbha region of Maharashtra, India. He wrote poems under the pen name Anil. He was born on 11 September 1901 at Murtijapur in Akola district of Central India. He was married to Kusum Jayawant in 1929; she took the name Kusumavati Deshpande and was also a Marathi writer.

Deshpande introduced free style --Muktachhand -- poetry to Marathi literature. He also introduced in Marathi Dashapadi, a new genre of sonnets comprising ten lines. His collection of poems with the same name Dashapadi received a Sahitya Akademi Award in 1977. He was elected for Sahitya Akademi Fellowship in 1979.

He presided over Marathi Sahitya Sammelan at Malvan in 1958.

Deshpande won several international honors. He was a member of the committee of literacy experts of UNESCO. He was leader of Indian delegation of literary experts to USSR. He was awarded UNESCO fellowship for studying social education schemes in various countries.

A collection of letters between Deshpande and his wife was published under the title Kusumanil in 1976.

== Works ==
The following are the titles of collections of Deshpande's poems:

- Phulwat (फुलवात) (1932)
- Bhagnamoorti (भग्नमूर्ति) (1940)
- Nirwasit Chini Mulas (निर्वासित चिनी मुलास) (1943)
- Perte Vha (पेर्ते व्हा) (1947)
- Sangati (सांगाती) (1961)
- Dashapadi (दशपदी) (1976)

Preceded by Anant Atmaram Kanekar	Marathi Sahitya Sammelan - President; 1958 at Malvan	Succeeded by Shrikrushna Keshav Kshirsagar
