= Keshav Jagannath Purohit =

Marathi writer

Keshav Jagannath Purohit (b. 1923– 17 October 2018) was a Marathi writer from Maharashtra, India. He wrote using the pen name Shantaram.

== Early life ==
Purohit was born in 1923 in the town of Chamorshi, which used to be in Chandrapur District and is now in Gadchiroli District. After attending Jubilee High School in the town of Chandrapur, he received college degrees, including a doctorate, in English literature from Nagpur University.

Purohit taught English literature for 40 years in different colleges in Nagpur, Amravati, and Mumbai, and served for some years as the principal of Ismail Yusuf College in Mumbai before retiring.

In 1989, he presided over Akhil Bharatiya Marathi Sahitya Sammelan, which was held in Amravati. He died at his residence in the Sahitya Sahawas Society in Vandre on 17 October 2018.

== Literary work ==
Purohit has written over 30 books on various topics.

He coordinated Marathi Vishwakosh (मराठी विश्वकोश) and coedited with Sudha Joshi Wisawe Shatak (विसावे शतक), a collection of worthy short stories in Marathi written by different authors of the twentieth century. He also compiled Pratinidhik Laghu Nibandh Sangrah (प्रातिनिधिक लघुनिबंध संग्रह). He translated into Marathi Ibsen's Norwegian Vikings of Helgeland, naming the translation as Helgelandche Chanche (हेल्गेलंडचे चांचे).

Santryancha Baag (संत्र्यांचा बाग) (1942) and Manamor (मनमोर) (1946) are two early works of Purohit.
