= Dattatraya Bhikaji Kulkarni =

Indian Marathi writer and critic (1934–2016)

Dattatraya Bhikaji Kulkarni (25 July 1934 – 27 January 2016) was an Indian Marathi writer, critic, university professor and freelance writer from Maharashtra. He was born in Nagpur on 25 July 1934. He was head of department of Marathi at the Rashtrasant Tukadoji Maharaj Nagpur University, of which he was also an alumni. He was the president of the 83rd Akhil Bharatiya Marathi Sahitya Sammelan, held in March 2010 in Pune. Kulkarni died after a brief illness in Pune, on 27 January 2016, at the age of 81.
