= Krushna Shastri Rajwade =

Indian writer (1820–1901)

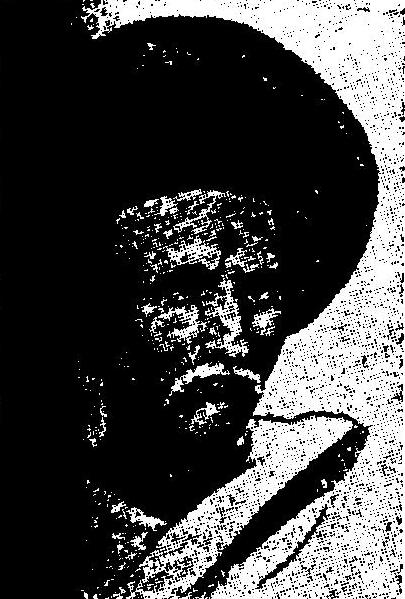
- Born: 1820; Poona, British India
- Died: 6 August 1901 (aged 80–81)
- Occupations: Writer, educator, and translator
- Writing career
- Language: Marathi

Krushna Shastri Rajwade (1820 – 6 August 1901) was a Marathi author, educator, and translator from Poona. He served as the president of the second Marathi Sahitya Sammelan held in Pune in 1885.

== Life and career ==
Rajwade was born in 1820. He pursued his education at the Sanskrit Pathshala in Pune, where he studied the subjects of Nyaya, Alankara, Vedanta, and Dharma. In 1841, he was appointed as a teacher of literature (Sahitya) and rhetoric (Alankarashastra) at the same pathshala.

In 1856, he was appointed to the translation division of the Education Department. He died on 6 August 1901 in Pune.

== Literary works ==
Rajwade authored critical works, translated classical Sanskrit literature into Marathi, and composed original poetry. His work is recognized as one of the early attempts to bring Sanskrit literary thought into the Marathi language.

=== Literary criticism and works ===
- Alankaraviveka (1853) – A notable work providing a brief overview of Sanskrit figures of speech (alankaras). To illustrate these concepts, Rajwade referenced the compositions of Marathi poets such as Mukteshwar and Vaman.

=== Translations ===
Rajwade translated several classical Sanskrit plays into Marathi, namely, Malatimadhava, Mudrarakshasa, Abhijnanashakuntala, Mahaviracharita.

=== Poetic works ===
- Rituvarnana, a poetic work written in imitation of Kalidasa's Ritusamhara.
- Utsavaprakasha, a work containing descriptions of eighteen Hindu festivals.

== Leadership and honours ==
In 1885, Rajwade presided over the second Marathi Sahitya Sammelan held in Pune.
