= Durga Bhagwat =

Indian writer (1910 – 2002)

Durga Narayan Bhagwat
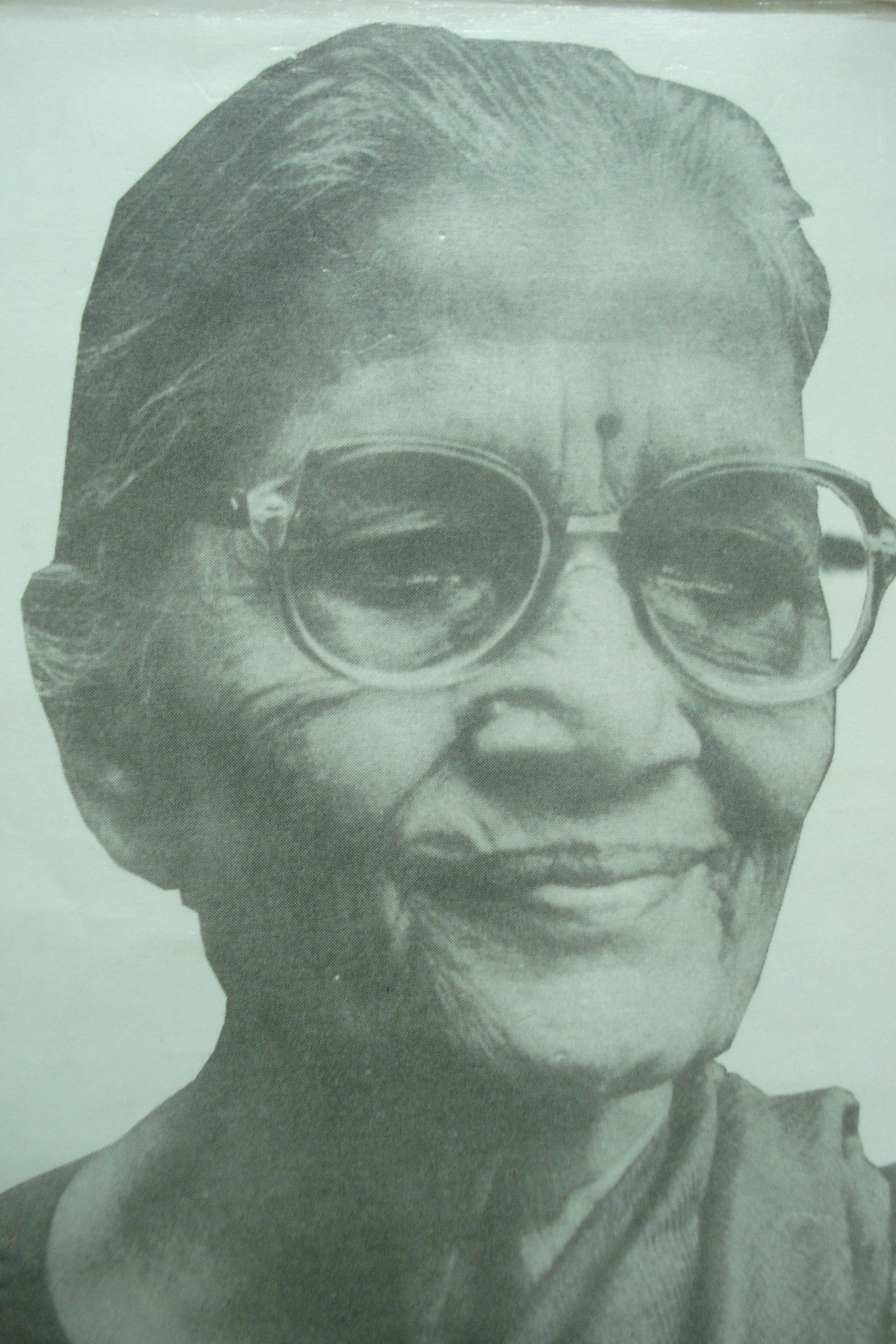
- Born: 10 February 1910
- Died: 7 May 2002 (aged 92)
- Relatives: Kamala Sohonie, sister
- Writing career
- Notable works: Pais, Vyas Parva, Bhavmudra, Rutuchakra
- Notable awards: Sahitya Academy (Pais)

Durga Narayan Bhagwat (10 February 1910 – 7 May 2002), popularly known as Durga Bhagwat, was an Indian scholar, socialist and writer. She studied Sanskrit and Buddhist literature and spent time in the jungles of Madhya Pradesh to study tribal life. She later returned to Mumbai as a researcher and wrote books in Marathi. She is arguably the foremost female writer in Marathi. Shes one amongst the prominent writers who opposed The Emergency (India). She also abstained from accepting such institutional and civilian honours as the Padma Shree and the Jnanapeeth.

== Early years ==
Durga Bhagwat was born in 1910 in a Karhade Brahmin family settled in the then princely state of Baroda. The veteran Sanskrit scholar and social activist Rajaram Shastri Bhagwat was the brother of her grandmother. Her sister Kamala Sohonie went on to become the first woman scientist of India. Her father was a scientist who discovered the procedure of making ghee from oil.

Durgabai was attracted to Gandhism and took part in Indian freedom movement for a very short time. When she realised that she cannot do it for a longer time she left that and completed her studies from St. Xavier's College. But she continued to wear Khadi in that period. Her paternal aunt, Seetabai Bhagwat, had a great influence on Durgabai. Durgabai went to Madhya Pradesh for studying tribal culture where she had an idiosyncratic reaction to yam (Elephant foot) for which she was bed-ridden for six years. She could not complete her doctorate course.

== Later years ==
Durga Bhagwat was elected President of the 51st Marathi Sahitya Sammelan, held in Karad, in 1975. She was the second woman President of the Sammelan, after Kusumavati Deshpande since its inception in 1878. Durgabai publicly opposed the state of Emergency imposed by Indira Gandhi and the arrest of Jaiprakash Narayan and was jailed by the government. After the emergency was lifted, she campaigned against the ruling Congress Party in the 1977 general election, and remained opposed to it for the rest of her life. After the Emergency, she was offered an influential government seat by the then ruling Janata Party which she declined. She decided not to accept any state-sponsored honours and declined the Jnyan Peeth Award.

Before chairing the Marathi Sahitya Sammelan, she was elected chairperson of the Tamasgir Meet and considered it a great honour.

Durga Bhagwat never married. Her idols throughout her life had been Vyasa, Gautama Buddha, Adi Shankaracharya, American philosopher Henry David Thoreau, and Indian writer Shridhar Venkatesh Ketkar.

== Her contribution ==
Durga Bhagwat's notable works include a biography of Rajaram Shastri Bhagwat, Pais, a collection of articles based around religions, their literature and practises and Vyas Parva, a book about her study of Mahabharat. She studied religious literature, particularly Buddhist, works of Marathi saints from Dnyaneshwar to Tukaram, major Sanskrit works of Vyas and Adi Shankaracharya. Her book RRitu-chakra, detailing the nature (particularly trees and flowers) in each Indian month, is perhaps her most famous work. During her prolonged recuperation after being food poisoned in Madhya Pradesh, she observed the changes in the nature over the 12-month cycle and spurred her to write articles on each season.

Bhagwat wrote many articles on cooking and crafts and was known as the 'Marathi Saraswatachi Sarswati'.

== Selected works ==
=== Short stories ===
- Poorva

=== Novels ===
- Mahanadichya tiravar

=== Children's literature ===
- Tulshiche lagna
- Vanwasi rajputra
- Chandralekha ani aath chor

=== Other works ===
- Loksahityachi ruprekha
- Athavale Tase
- Dharma ani loksahitya
- Vyas parva
- Rupranga
- Pais
- Prasangika
- Doob
- Bhavmudra
- Khamanga
- Satyam Shivam Sundaram
- Ketkaki kadambari
- Rajaram Shastri Bhagwat yanche charitra
- Rutuchakra
- Godhadi
- Dupani
- Nisargotsav
- Shodh Ramayanacha

Preceded by Purushottam Laxman Deshpande	Marathi Sahitya Sammelan - President; 1975 at Karad	Succeeded by Purushottam Bhaskar Bhave
