= Akshaykumar Kale =

Critic of modern poetry

Dr. Akshaykumar Kale
- Born: 27 July 1953 (age 73); Warud, India
- Education: Nagpur University
- Occupations: Head of marathi department (Retd.), Nagpur University Head of Tukdoji Adhyasan,(Retd.) Nagpur University Member, General Council, Sahitya Akademi
- Years active: 1975–present
- Spouse: Dr. Kalpana Kale

Dr. Akshaykumar Malharrao Kale born 27 July 1953, is a critic of modern Marathi poetry, and was Professor and Head of Marathi Department in RTM Nagpur University, Nagpur, India. In the field of criticism of modern Marathi poetry, his contributions have attracted the attention of scholars of Marathi language and literature throughout Maharashtra. He was the president of prestigious 90th Akhil Bharatiya Marathi Sahitya Sammelan held in Dombivali. Kale is also member of general Council of Sahitya Akademi, India.

== Early life and career ==
Kale was born on 27 July 1953 in the Kale family of Warud. He studied in Mahatma Fule College, Warud. He stood first in the MA Examination in 1974 and for PhD research he was awarded a Junior Research Fellowship of UGC, New Delhi in 1975. In 1980 at the age of 27 he was awarded doctorate (PhD) for his dissertation on "Trends in Post Independence Marathi Poetry 1947 to 1970" In 1980, he started his professional career with Dharampeth Arts and Commerece College, Nagpur. He secured his D.Litt. degree for his dissertation on "Arvacheen Marathi Kavyadarshan" in 1999, which has been commercially published.

== Literature ==
Kale has been involved in research activities and has regularly published research articles in journals such as Pratishthan, Maharashtra Sahitya Patrika and Yugawani He has written over 100 articles published in various state and national magazines and newspapers, and many books.

- 'Suktasandharbha' ( Marathi : सुक्तसंधर्भ ) (1985),
- 'Govindagraj Samiksha' ( Marathi : गोविंदाग्रज समीक्षा ) (1985),
- 'Kavita Kusumagrajanchi' ( Marathi : कविता कुसुमाग्रजांची ) (1987),
- ‘Arvacheen Marathi Karyadarshan’ ( Marathi : अर्वाचीन मराठी काव्यदर्शन ) (1999),
- 'Mardhekaranchi Kavita : Aakalan Aswad aani Chikitsa' ( Marathi : मर्ढेकरांची कविता : आकलन आस्वाद आणि चिकित्सा ) (2006),
- 'Rashtrasanta Tukdoji Maharaj – Vyakti Ani Wangmay' (Marathi : राष्ट्रसंत तुकडोजी महाराज – व्यक्ती आणि वांग्मय) (2008),
- 'Grace Vishayi' (Marathi :ग्रेस विषयी) (2009).
- 'Sampradayik Sadhbhav ani samajik shantata' (Marathi :सांप्रदायिक सद्भाव आणि सामाजिक शांतता ) (2011)
- 'Pratitivibhram' (Marathi : प्रतीतिविभ्रम) (2013)
- ' Ghalibche Urdu Kavyavishwa (Marathi : गालिबचे उर्दू काव्याविश्व : अर्थ आणि भाष्य ) (2014)

Apart from the above books written by him, below media is published on Dr.Kale

- 'Arvacheen marathi kavyamimansa (Marathi : अर्वाचीन मराठी काव्यमिमांसा - डॉ. अक्षयकुमार काळे गौरवग्रंथ) (2014) - edited by various authors is commercially published.
- 'Dr. Akshaykumar Kale Hyancha kavyasamikshecha chikitsak abhyas) (Marathi : डॉ. अक्षयकुमार काळे ह्यांचा काव्यसमीक्षेचा चिकित्सक अभ्यास), written by Dr.Ganesh Malte The Thesis has been awarded Ph.D. in 2012.
- Documentary Film created on Dr.Kale in 2013

== Awards, honours and recognition ==
Kale has been conferred various awards. Below is the list of awards and issuing authority:

- Narahar Kurundakar Puraskar – Government of Maharashtra, 2000
- Best State Teacher Award – Government of Maharashtra
- Na.Chi. Kulkarni Award - Government of Maharashtra, 2022
- Kusumanil Smruti Samiksha Puraskar – Vidharbha Sahitya Sanga
- R.S. Jog Paritoshik – Maharashtra Sahitya Parishad, 2000
- D.D. Punde Samikshamitra Puraskar – Sneha Vardhan Prakashan, 2000
- Maharashtra Saraswat Puraskar – Rasik Rachana. Sanskrutik Ani Shaikshanik Mandal Wani, 2007
- Dr. V.B Kolte Janmashatabdi Vishesh Puraskar – Lokseva And Vikas Sansta, Chandrapur, 2008
- Award from maharashtra Granthottejak Sabha, Pune, 2006
- Best Teacher award of Acharya Atre Smrutee Prateishthan, Pune
- M.B.Chitnis Puraskar from Marathwada Sahitya Parishad, 2016
- Padmashri N.D.Mahanor Rajya Sahitya Puraskar, by Sahani Trust & Urmi Sanstha, 2016
- Sharatchandra Manohar Bhalerao Paritoshik for - Ghalib : Kaal, Charitra aani Vyaktimatva. From Maharashtra Sahitya Parishad Pune, May 2022
- Setu Madhavrao Pagdi Puraskar, Sahitya Akademi

Dr Kale has also held below positions apart from his professional role

- President of the 4th Jansahitya Sammelan, Sakoli organised by Vidarbha Sahitya Sangha in 2002.
- President of R.T.M. Nagpur University Marathi Pradhyapak Parishad, Bhandra, 14th Session 2003
- President of Sant Gadgebaba Amravati University Marathi Pradhyapak Parishad, Yavatmal, 17th Session in 2003.
- President of 64th Vidarbha Sahitya Sammelan 2014.
- Member, General council - Sahitya Akademi, General council, Sahitya Akademi, and he is one of the 20 representatives of universities across India, since 2013
- President of 90th Akhil Bharatiya Marathi Sahitya Sammelan, Dombivli 2017

== Personal life ==
Kale was born to Malharrao Kale (1919–2010) and Rajani Kale. He resides in Nagpur along with his wife Dr. Kalpana Kale. He has two sons, Amit and Salil.
