= Anand Yadav =

Marathi writer

Anand Ratan Yadav (30 November 1935 – 27 November 2016) was a Marathi writer from Maharashtra, India. He is best known for his autobiography Zombi.

== Literary work ==
Yadav was one of the early writers of Marathi Gramin Sahitya (literature pertaining to rural life in Maharashtra). His novel "Zombi" (झोंबी) (meaning "fight against all odds") won a Sahitya Akademi Award in 1990. The novel is an autobiographical story of a young boy, his loving mother, his life of utter poverty, and his eagerness to receive education. Yadav wrote three sequels to autobiographical Zombi (झोंबी), Nangarani (नांगरणी) (meaning cultivation of the soil), Gharabhinti (घरभिंती ) (meaning housewalls), and Kachawel (काचवेल) (meaning a vine of pieces of glass). The famous Marathi movie Natarang is based on Yadav's novel Natarang. The lesson Gaavachi Sanskruti he Gaavache Vyaktimatva in Marathi textbook of Maharashtra State Board of Secondary and Higher Secondary Education is taken from his

== 82nd Marathi Sahitya Sammelan ==
Yadav was elected as the president of the 82nd Marathi Sahitya Sammelan which was held at Mahabaleshwar in March 2009. However, he resigned from that position four days before the sammelan in response to protests primarily by members of the varkari mahamandal against some of the material in his biographical novel Santasurya Tukaram (संतसूर्य तुकाराम). The mahamandal members had demanded his resignation with a warning that they would disrupt the sammelan if their demand was not met.

Preceded by Madhukar Dattatreya Hatakananglekar	Marathi Sahitya Sammelan - President; 2009 at Mahabaleshwar	Succeeded by -
