= Manik Sitaram Godghate =

Marathi poet

Manik Godghate a.k.a. Grace
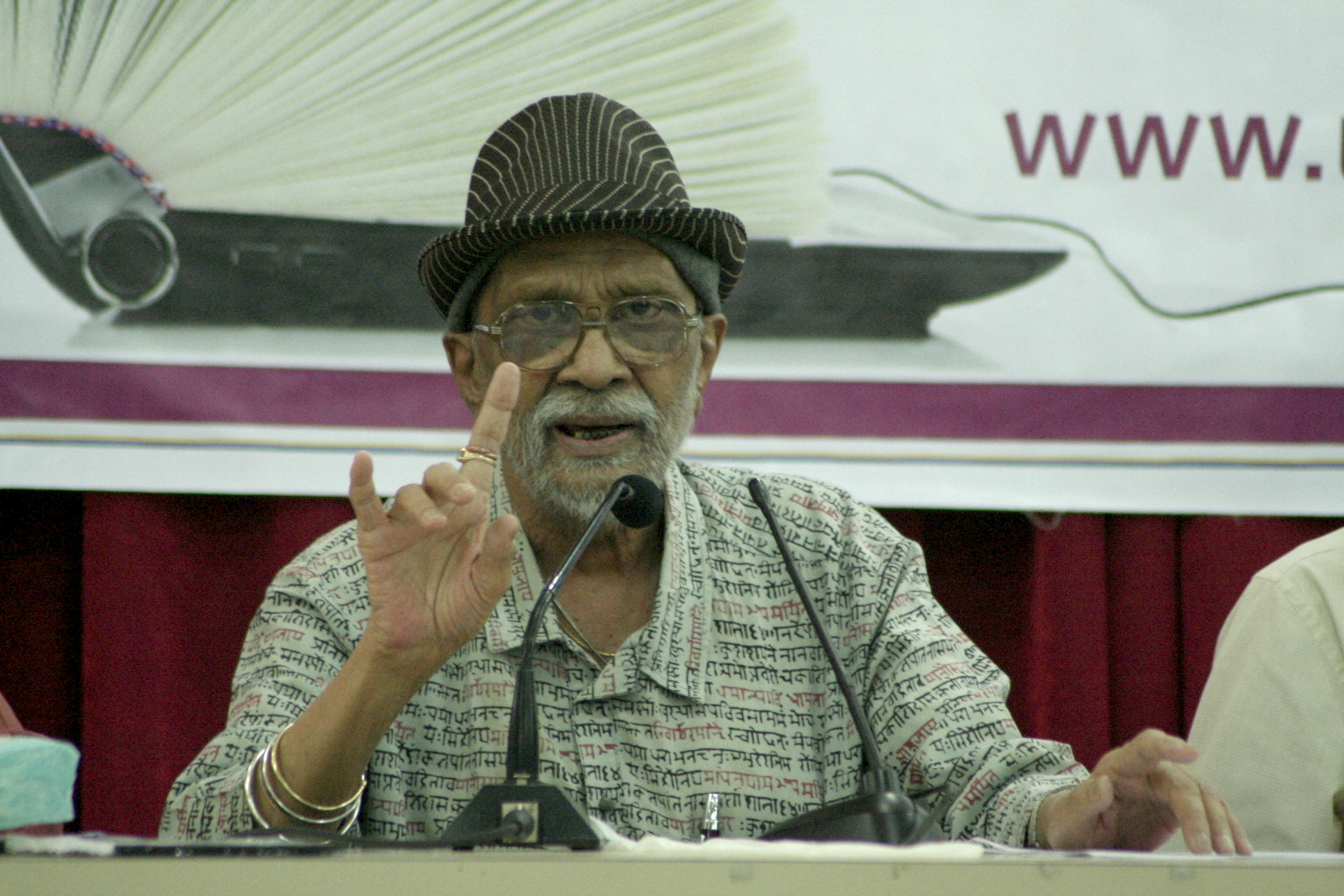
- Born: Manik Sitaram Godghate; 10 May 1937; Nagpur, Maharashtra, India
- Died: 26 March 2012 (aged 74); Pune, Maharashtra, India
- Resting place: Nagpur
- Education: Nagpur University
- Occupations: Professor and Editor
- Years active: 1966–1997
- Known for: Poems, Speeches
- Spouse: Dr Leela Mate
- Children: 3

Manik Godghate, popularly known by his pen name Grace, was a Marathi prose writer and poet. He is most popular as lyricist of the Marathi song "Bhaya Ithale Sampat Nahi", which was sung by Lata Mangeshkar as the title track for the TV serial Mahashweta. His book Vaaryane Halte Raan (The forest swings with the wind) was awarded the prestigious Sahitya Akademi Award in 2011.

His works include Churchbell and Mitvaa in prose, and Sandhyaakalchya Kavita, Rajputra Aani Darling, Saanjbhayaachayaa Saajani and Chandramadhaviche Pradesh in poetry.

Influenced by Ingrid Bergman's acting in the film The Inn of the Sixth Happiness as if she was in grace, Manik Godghate decided to call himself "Grace". He revealed this in an interview with Akshaykumar Kale. The long interview (pg. 19 to 98) in published in his book "Gracevishayi...". Grace's first book of poetry, Sandhyaakalchya Kavita, is dedicated to Ingrid Bergman.

== Early life ==
Grace was born as Manik Seetaram Godghate on 10 May 1940 in Colonel Baug, Nagpur. Godghate's father Seetaram served in the armed forces and was known for being a connoisseur of the Arts. The early years were difficult for Godghate. Following the early death of his mother Sumitra, the household fell into a disarray that was for Godghate to manage. Godghate finished his matriculation from the Navyug Vidyalay and took to earning a livelihood while still in college. As an undergraduate, he moved out of his parents' home and supported himself by teaching and working as a typist. Soon after finishing his undergraduate education he married Dr. Sumati Mate, whom he liked to call Leela. In some personal correspondence Godghate has addressed Sumati Mate as "Leela Gunavardhane". On the eve of his university examination he met with a road accident. Despite this mishap, in the year 1966, Godghate earned the degree 'Master of the Arts' (M.A.) with a major in Marathi Literature from the university of Nagpur. He was awarded the N.K. Behere gold medal for academic excellence. His hands were still plastered for fractures when he accepted the medal

His earliest poems were published in the local weekly magazine Rashtra Shakti. In the later, more stable period of his career, he worked as a lecturer in the National College, the Science College and the Morris College, Nagpur

== Poetic style ==
Godghate's poetic style is known to be abstruse. Defending his style, Godghate, in a speech given in Ralegaon said, "My poetry is my Soliloquy and by its nature, a soliloquy lacks the awareness of a sense. It does not require and nor does it assume the existence of an audience. It springs boldly forth from its creator. My poetry does not bear the pretensions of a pedant neither does it make a prize of ignorance. I am the sort of poet who coins new words in the language".

His collection of 77 poems Sandhyakalcya Kavita was published in 1967. Of these, his poem "Varshav" was written in 1960 whereas other all were written in 1958. The writer critic Dr. Prabha Ganorkar, wife of poet Vasant Abaji Dahake, has analyzed his this collection of poems. She notes that around 50 of these poems are referred to a woman ("Tu", Marathi for "You") where the woman has physical or emotional relationship with the First person ("Me", Marathi form of I/Me). Despite this, she does not classify the poetry as romantic.

His next collection of poems "Rajputra Aani Darling" was published in 1974. His 1977's publication "Chandramaadhaviche Pradesh" had the poems "Bhaya Ithle Sampat Nahi" and "Ti Geli Tevha Rimzhim" which were composed by Hridaynath Mangeshkar. The collection "Sandhyaparvaatil Vaishanavi" is divided into two section "Prarthanaparva" and "Sandhyaparva" with 33 and 63 poems respectively. His last publication "Baai! Jogiyapurush" is a compilation of about 112 poems written by him from 1958 to 2011.

== Death ==
Godghate succumbed to cancer following a three-year battle with the disease, he was 74. He died of throat cancer.

== Publications ==
Poetry

- 1967 - "Sandhyakalchya Kavita"
- 1974 - "Rajputra Aani Darling"
- 1977 - "Chandramaadhaviche Pradesh"
- 1995 - "Sandhyaparvaatil Vaishanavi"
- 2006 - "Saanjbhayachya Saajani"
- 2012 - "Oolya Weluchi Basari"
- 2012 - "Baai! Jogiyapurush"
- Unpublished - "Laatanche Deool"

Prose

- 1974 - "Churchbell"
- 1987 - "Mitwa"
- 2000 - "Sandhyamagna Purushachi Lakshane"
- 2003 - "Mrugajalache Baandkaam"
- 2008 - "Waaryane Halte Raan"
- 2010 - "Kaawale Udale Swami"
- 2012 - "Olya Weluchi Basari"
