= Vasant Narhar Phene =

Vasant Narhar Phene (28 April 1926 - 6 March 2018, India) was a Marathi language author. He is well known in Maharashtra for his novels and articles. In 2004, he received the N.S. Phadke Award for his work.

== Works ==
His books include Central Bus Station (सेन्ट्रल बस स्टेशन), Panchkathai (पंचकथाए), Mule Ani Pale (मुले अणि पाले), and Pita-Putra (पिता पुत्र). Karwari Mati - कारवारी माती (Novel), Deshantar Katha - देशांतर कथा (कथासंग्रह)

== Award ==
He was awarded Bhau Padhye Sahitya Gaurav Shabd award by Shabd The Book gallery in 2017

Phene lived in Mumbai.
