= Vishnu Moreshwar Mahajani =

Rao Bahadur Vishnu Moreshwar Mahajani
- Born: 12 November 1851; Pune, Bombay Presidency
- Died: 16 February 1923 (aged 71)
- Education: Deccan College
- Occupations: Poet, playwright

Rao Bahadur Vishnu Moreshwar Mahajani (12 November 1851 – 16 February 1923) was a Marathi poet and playwright from the Bombay Presidency, British India.

== Biography ==
Mahajani was born on 12 November 1851 in Pune. He studied at Deccan College in Pune to receive his master's degree in 1873. He then served for a few years as a teacher in Akola. He was awarded Rao Bahadur in 1913.

The liberal views of Justice Mahadev Govind Ranade had highly influenced Mahajani's thinking. He used to attend several meetings of Prarthana Samaj, where abhang of Sant Tukaram would often be recited. The recitations developed his deep interest in the works of Tukaram. In 1902, he delivered lectures on the works of Tukaram at the Hemantotsav Vyakhanmala in Mumbai. Later he translated 900 Marathi abhang of Sant Tukaram into English. (They remain unpublished.)

Mahajani wrote 12 Marathi books which comprise plays and collections of his poems, the latter including translations of some English poems. (Three of Mahajani's works remain unpublished.)

He chaired Regional Social Conference, a conference related with conference of Indian National Congress, held in Dharwad in 1903.

He chaired in 1907 Marathi Sahitya Sammelan held in Pune.
