= Subhash Bhende =

Indian writer

Subhash Bhende was an Indian writer based in Goa, India. Humor characterizes many of Bhende's writings. He presided over Marathi Sahitya Sammelan held at Karad, Maharashtra in 2003. He died in December, 2010.

== Bibliography ==
The following is a list of Bhende's books:

- Sāhitya-sãskr̥tī (Śrīvidyā Prakāśana, 1999)
- Kinārā (Mêjesṭika Prakāśana, 1994)
- Pitaḷī daravājā (Śrīvidyā Prakāśana, 1993)
- Nivaḍaka gambhīra āṇi gamatīdāra (Mêjesṭika Prakāśana, 1990)
- Jethe jāto tethe (Śrīvidyā Prakāśana, 1990)
- Uddhvasta (Menakā Prakāśana, 1985)
- Drāksha āṇi rudrāksha (Śrīvidyā Prakāśana, 1983)
- Eka ḍoḷe, sāta gāḷe (Sana Pablikeśansa, 1982)
- Mārga sukhācā (Mêjesṭika, 1984)
- Pailatīra (Mêjesṭika, 1982)
- Svarga dona boṭã (Rādhā Prakāśana, 1981)
- Lāmbalacaka Kāḷīśāra sāvalī (Viśvamohinī, 1981)
- Nepoliyananantara tumhīca (Mīnala Prakāśana, 1981)
- Andhāravāṭā. (1978)
- Hasavegirī (Bā. Ga. Ḍhavaḷe Prakāśana, 1978)
- Hāsa-parihāsa (Ameya Prakāśana, 1978)
- Phūla nā phulācī pākaḷī. (1975)
- Dilakhulāsa. (1975)
- Smitakathā. (1973)
- Āmace Gõya āmakā jāya. (1970)
