= F. M. Shinde =

Indian writer

F. M. Shinde (Rupurkar) (b. 1948) is a Marathi writer from Maharashtra, India.

He has published thus far 24 collections of his poetry, three compilations of his literary critiques, a collection of his one-act plays, a translation of a book, and a collection of his humorous essays. He was born in a small village called Rupur in Kalamnuri Taluka of the Hingoli district of Maharashtra.

Swanta (स्वांत) (1973), Adima (आदिम) (1975), and Awashesh (अवशेष) (1979) are the titles of three of Shinde's poetry collections.

His other works include "Kshetra" (क्षेत्र), "Aai ani Itar Kavita" (आई आणि इतर कविता), "Mi Samil Samuhaat" (मी सामील समूहात), "Nirvasit Nakshatra" (निर्वासित नक्षत्र) among many others.

Shinde is a professor of Marathi.

== Awards and recognition ==
Shinde has received for his poetry three Maharashtra state awards and also Vikhe Patil Award, Damani Literature Award, Asmitadarsha Award, and Parimal Award.

He been selected to preside over Marathwada Sahitya Sammelan which was scheduled to be held in December 2009. Shinde was elected as the President of the 87th Akhil Bharatiya Marathi Sahitya Sammelan to be held in Saswad in 2014.
