= Purushottam Shivaram Rege =

Marathi writer from Maharashtra, India

Purushottam Shivaram Rege (2 August 1910 – 17 February 1978) was a Marathi writer from Maharashtra, India.

He, commonly known by his initials Pu Shi Rege, was born in Ratnagiri District, Bombay Presidency, British India in 1910. After receiving his degrees in economics from Mumbai and London universities, he taught that subject at various colleges in Maharashtra and Goa. He retired in the 1970s as the principal of Elphinstone College in Mumbai.

Rege held a devout Shakta (शाक्त) belief centered on goddess Shantadurga (शांतादुर्गा).

He presided over Marathi Sahitya Sammelan at Wardha in 1969.

== Literary work ==
The following is a partial list of Rege's works:

=== Critique ===
- Marmabhed (मर्मभेद)
- Chhandsi (छांदसी)

=== Autobiography ===
- Eka Pidhiche Atmakathan (एका पिढीचे आत्मकथन)

=== Novels ===
- Matruka (मातृका)
- Awalokita (अवलोकिता)
- Sawitri (सावित्री)
- Rennu (रेणू)

=== Play ===
- Ranga Panchalik (रंग पांचालिक)

=== Collections of poems ===
- Sadhana Ani Itar Kavita (साधना आणि इतर कविता) (1931)
- Himasek (हिमसेक) (1943)
- Priyal (प्रियाळ) (1972)
- Dola (दोला) (1962)
- Dusara Pakshi (हसरा पक्षी) (1966)
- Suhrud Gatha (सुह्रदगाथा ) (1975)
- Aniha (अनीह) (published posthumously in 1984)
- Fulora (फुलोरा’)
- Gandharekha (गंधरेखा)
- Pushkala (पुष्कळा)
- Pu. Shi. Rege Yanchi Niwadak Kawita (पु. शि. रेगे यांची निवडक कविता ) (Edited by Prakash Deshpande)
- Pu. Shi. Rege : Vyakti aanni Waangmaya, 2007 (पु० शि० रेगे : व्यक्ती आणि वाङ्मय), by Professor (Dr.) S. M. Tadkodkar, Goa University, Goa - 403 206
- Tu Havis Yaat Na Paap
