= Ramesh Mantri =

Indian writer

Ramesh Mantri (1927–1997) was a Marathi writer primarily of humor from Maharashtra, India.

He attended Rajaram College in Kolhapur from where he graduated. He also spent some time in the United Kingdom in connection with higher education on a Commonwealth programme. He was employed with the United States Information Service (USIS) in Mumbai India in 1960s. Mantri presided over Marathi Sahitya Sammelan at Kolhapur in 1992. He created a fictional character Janu Bande which was a caricature of James Bond and a few short stories involving that character.

He was married and had 3 children.

== Literary works ==
The following is a partial list of Mantri's books:

- Uttarkal (उत्तरकाळ)
- Hulkawani (हुलकावणी)
- Hasyadhara (हास्यधारा)
- Thandiche Diwas (थंडीचे दिवस)
- Sukhachya Ratri (सुखाच्या रात्री)
- Sukhache Diwas (सुखाचे दिवस)
- Mawashi Harawali (मावशी हरवली)
- Bol Bol Mhanata (बोल बोल म्हणता)
- Kolhapuri Chiwda (कोल्हापुरी चिवडा)
- Palasala Pane Pach (पळसाला पाने पाच)
- Hasanyacha Tas (हसण्याचा तास) (तीन खंड)
- Ati Jhale Ni Hasu Ale (अति झाले नि हसू आले)
- Elizabeth Taylor Ani Mi (एलीझबेथ टेलर आणि मी)
- Surya Putrancha Desh Japan (सूर्यपुत्रांचा देश जपान)
- Bara Lakhanchya Jagachi Safar (बारा लाखांच्या जगाची सफर)
- Mahanagar
- Japan madhye 0005 Janu Bande (जपान मध्ये 0005 जनू बांडे)
- Adhunik Mahabharat (आधुनिक महाभारत)
- 005 Janu Bande (005 जनू बांडे)
