= Rajendra Banhatti =

Marathi Writer

Rajendra Banhatti is a Marathi writer from Maharashtra, India. He is the son of famous Marathi writer and biographer Shrinivas Narayan Banhatti. He has completed his MA in English and MA in psychology. He was the director of Suvichar Publishing House in Pune. Banhatti has been awarded the Maharashtra State Literary Award four times for his books.

He was the president of Maharashtra Sahitya Parishad and also the member of Akhil Bhartiya Marathi Sahitya Mahamandal. He presided over Marathi Sahitya Sammelan in Pune in 2002.

== Works ==
Novels

- अखेरचे आत्मचरित्र
- अपूर्णा
- मरणानंतरचे मरण
- त्रैराशिक

Short Story Collections

- समानधर्मा
- गंगार्पण
- कृष्णजन्म
- खेळ
- अवेळ
- लांडगा
- युद्धपर्व
- प्रेक्षक
- राजेन्द्र बनहट्टी यांच्या निवडक लघुकथा (Compilation by श्रीराम शिधये)

== Sources ==
- http://www.thehoot.org/web/home/searchdetail.php?sid=506&bg=1
- http://www.dilipprabhawalkar.com/v1/awards1.htm
