= Keshav Meshram =

Marathi poet, critic and writer

Keshav Tanaji Meshram
- Born: 24 November 1937; Akola
- Died: 3 December 2007 (aged 70)

Keshav Tanaji Meshram (24 November 1937 – 3 December 2007) was a Marathi poet, critic, novelist, and short-story writer from Maharashtra, India. He wrote about 40 books.

== Early life ==
Meshram was born in a poor dalit family in Akola on 24 November 1937. He spent his teens and early adulthood working as a railway wagon loader, a construction worker, and an oil mill worker. While struggling to make a living, he continued his education. After graduation from college, he joined Western Railways as a clerk, but later secured the position of a Marathi lecturer at Maharshi Dayanand College in Parel area of Mumbai.

== Conversion to Buddhism ==
Meshram was one among the six lakh Dalits who embraced Buddhism in the historic 1956 conversion rally held by Babasaheb Ambedkar.

== Literary works ==
Meshram's collection of poems Utkhanan established him as an important poet. His most popular novel Hakikat ani Jatayu portrayed the anguish of a brilliant dalit youth, Abhiman, who was sidelined because of his low social status. Abhimaan fought against superstitions. He unsuccessfully tried to save a "possessed" girl from being molested and beaten up. His "interference" with the rituals of a tantrik priest brought him disaster. The girl died and the police framed him at just the time he had received his appointment letter for a job.

Meshram's autobiography Hakikat shows the development of a sensitive mind in an adverse world. His other literary works deal with the plight of dalits, but he always exercised restraint in attacking the privileged classes for the plight.

"ज्वाला कल्लोळ" is the title of one of Meshram's works.

== Marathi Sahitya Sammelan ==
Meshram presided over the Akhil Bharatiya Marathi Sahitya Sammelan held at Nashik in 2005.

In his presidential speech, he criticized the contemporary literary folks for confining their world only to elites without awareness of the lives of millions of poor people in India. At the same time, he also criticized the extremist trend in contemporary dalit literature, which sharply attacked the privileged classes and then called itself "revolutionary."

In his speech, Meshram suggested that the state government create a literary academy to translate great literary works from other languages into Marathi, and vice versa.

== Death ==
Meshram died of lung cancer on 3 December 2007.
