= Madhav Vinayak Kibe =

Sardar Madhavrao Kibe
- Born: 1877; Indore State, India
- Died: Unknown; Indore
- Occupations: Scholar, Prime Minister of Dewas, Titled Sardar of Indore
- Years active: British India
- Spouse: Kamla bai Kibe
- Children: Indirabai Bhadkamkar, Sharad Kibe, Sushilabai Dandekar, Arvind Kibe

Academic work
- Notable works: Location of Lanka and Studies in Indian States Currencies

Sardar Madhavrao Vinayak Kibe (1877–Unknown) was a scholar from Indore State, India. He was from the Karhade Brahmin Kibe family founded by Vithalrao Mahadeo Kibe, known as Tantya Jog, the Prime Minister to Maharaja Malhar Rao Holkar.

== Education ==
He was the first alumnus of Daly College to pass. He obtained his B.A. degree in 1899 and M.A. degree 2 years later from the Muir Central College, Allahabad.

== Work ==
After completing his education he served as an Honorary Secretary to the Indore darbar for a few years. Later, he was taken on the staff of the Agent of Governor-General in Central India as Honorary Attaché and Magistrate. In 1911, he was appointed to officiate as Diwan to the Raja Saheb of Dewas, Junior Branch. He was made a Rao Bahadur in June 1912.

He presided over Marathi Sahitya Sammelan held in Mumbai in 1926. He also attended Round Table Conference in London along with his spouse. He and his wife were the member of Congress.

Location of Lanka and Studies in Indian States Currencies were two among his works.

== Personal life ==
Sardar Madhavrao Kibe was born to Vithalrao Kibe. Kibe's were Jagirdars and Sahukars. The saying goes Holkar ka raaj aur Kibe ka byaaj. He was married to Kamlabai Kibe who was a notable social worker. He has four children. The eldest daughter Indirabai was married to Bal Krishna Vasudev Bhadkamkar an I.C.S Officer. His son Sharad Kibe was married to Shakuntala bai Kibe who was a Patwardhan princess from Kurundwar junior. His younger daughter was married to I.C.S. Officer Narayan Dandekar. His granddaughter Layla raje Patwardhan was the Rajmata of Jamkhandi. His grandson, Ashok Bhadkamkar died as Indian Ambassador.
