= Shankar Damodar Pendse =

Marathi writer

Shankar Damodar Pendse (1897 - 1974) was a Marathi writer from Maharashtra, India.

He chaired Marathi Sahitya Sammelan at Pandharpur in 1955.

== Literary work ==
The following are Pendse's major works:

- Maharashtracha Sanskrutik Itihas (महाराष्ट्राचा सांस्कृतिक इतिहास)
- Dnyandev Ani Namdev (ज्ञानदेव आणि नामदेव)
- Waidik Wāṅmayātīl Bhāgawat Dharmāchā Wikās
- Paurāṇik Bhāgawat Dharma
- Bhāgavatottam Sant Shrī Ekanāth
- Sākshātkārī Sant Tukāram
