= Krushnaji Pandurang Kulkarni =

- Born: 1893; Maharashtra
- Died: 1964 (aged 70–71)
- Writing career
- Notable works: Marathi Bhasha Udgam Va Vikas, Marathi Vyutpatti Kosh, Rajwade Marathi Dhatu Kosh

Krushnaji Pandurang Kulkani (1893–1964) was a Marathi writer from Maharashtra, India.

== Works ==
The following is a partial list of Kulkarni's works:

- Marathi Bhasha Udgam Va Vikas (मराठी भाषा उद्गम व विकास)
- Marathi Vyutpatti Kosh (मराठी व्युत्पत्तिकोश)
- Rajwade Marathi Dhatu Kosh (राजवाडे मराठी धातुकोश) (Editor)
- Maharashtra Gatha (महाराष्ट्र गाथा) (Co-editor: Pralhad Keshav Atre)

== Awards ==
In 1952, he presided over Marathi Sahitya Sammelan, which was held in Amalner.
