= Mrunalini Desai =

Marathi writer

Mrunalini Desai was a Marathi writer from Maharashtra, India.

== Works ==
The following is a list of her books:

- Āryā Vedavatī (1989)
- Maṇibahan Paṭel (1986)
- Pūrṇāhuti (1979)
- Prītīcī Rīt (1979)
- Pūrṇāhuti (1979)
- Pragatīcyā Nikashāvar (1977)
- Pragatine Panthe (1977)
- Rusavā (1976)
- Ināmadār (1975)
- Bilvadal (1975)
- Strī (1974)
- Rājaghāṭ (1974)
- Ānandayātrā (1973)
- Niśigandha (1973)
- Yoginī (1972)
- Bhagavān Paraśurām (1970)
- Putra Mānavācā (1969)
- Virāṇī (1967)
