= Arvind Gokhale =

Indian writer

Aravind Gokhale (1919 - 1992) was a Marathi writer of short stories. He hailed from Maharashtra, India.

== Early life ==
Aravind Gokhale received his M.Sc. in Botany from Bombay University. He received his M.S. in Agricultural Journalism from Wisconsin University. He taught and conducted research in Economic Botany for 20 years at the College of Agriculture in Poona. He later worked as a Fertilizer Executive with a firm in Bombay, The Dharamshi Morarji Chemical Co. Ltd. He lived in both Bombay (where he worked) and Poona (where his family lived).

He was one of the pioneers of the modern Marathi short story. He had written over 300 short stories in Marathi, collected in 20 books, by 1965. His stories have been translated in most of the Indian and European languages. He was the Editor of "Pick of the Year" a Marathi annual of short stories.

He received State Awards for three successive years for best short story collections.

He was awarded a prize (shared) for the best short story in an Afro-Asian Short Story competition organized by the London-based Encounter magazine.

He has written numerous film scripts, radio skits and a travelogue on the U.S.

== Authorship ==
Gokhale wrote 25 collections of his short stories. The following are some of them:

- Najarana (1944)
- Maher (1949)
- Mithila (1959)
- Anamika (1961)
- Nakoshi (1977)
- Mukta
- Manjula
- Rikta
