= Yashawant Dinkar Phadke =

Historian and political activist from Maharashtra, India (1931–2008)

- Born: 3 January 1931; Solapur, Maharashtra, India
- Died: 11 January 2008 (aged 77)
- Occupations: Historia, political activist

Yashawant Dinkar Phadke (Y. D. Phadke) (3 January 1931 – 11 January 2008) was a historian and a political activist from Maharashtra, India.

== Education ==
Phadke received a Bachelor's degree from Pune University and a Master's degree and doctorate in economics and political science from Mumbai University. His doctoral thesis was titled Sanyukta Maharashtra Chalwal Ani Congress Paksha (Struggle for United Maharashtra and the Congress Party).

== Career ==
For some time, Phadke served as the director of Maharashtra state government's Administrative Institute before starting his long teaching career as a professor of political science at Pune and Mumbai universities. In 1984, Phadke was awarded the Fulbright scholarship to complete his research at Temple University’s Center for Study of Federalism. During 1985-1991, he taught sociology at the Tata Institute of Social Sciences.

During 1991-1993, the Bharatiya Samaj Vidnyan Sanshodhan Parishad awarded Phadke its first Dr. Babasaheb Ambedkar Fellowship. The Asiatic Society in Mumbai conferred on him an honorary membership. (During the 1815-1995 180-year period, the Asiatic Society has awarded this honor only on 122 persons.)

Phadke served for a while as the president of Maharashtra State Board for Culture and Literature. He was the president of the 73rd Marathi Sahitya Sammelan, which was held in Belgaum in year 2000. He headed the Marathi advisory committee at Indian Dnyanpeeth. He was a member of the advisory committee to the central government’s ministry for information and broadcasting.

== Authorship ==
Phadke wrote in English and Marathi on a wide range of historical events and personalities of Maharashtra belonging to the last two centuries.

In English:

- The Constitution of India (Coauthored with R. Sririvasan)
- Senapati Bapat : Portrait of a Revolutionary
- Maharashtra in the 20th Century
- Social Reformers of Maharashtra
- Social Reform Movements in Maharashtra
- Politics and Language
- Women in Maharashtra
- V. K. Chiploonkar

In Marathi:

(Most of his Marathi work remains untranslated into English.)

- Sanshodhak Yashavant Dinkar Phadke (Coauthored with Nilā Upādhye)
- Sansada : Tevha Ani Ata
- Dharma Ani Rajakaran
- Ajakalache Rajakarani
- Bharatiya Nagarikatva
- Nahi Chira, Nahi Panati
- Jammu-Kashmir: Svayattvata Ki Svatantya?
- Adhunikata Ani Parampara : Ekonisavya Shatakatil Maharashtra (Coauthored with Rajendra Vhora)
- Visavya Shatakatil Maharashtra
- Shivachhatrapati: Itihas Ani Charitra
- Mahatma Phule Gaurava Grantha (Coauthored with Hari Narake)
- Shahu Chatrapati Ani Lokamanya
- Agarkar
- Ketkar Lekh Sangraha (Compilation of Shridhar Venkatesh Ketkar's essays)
- Dr. Ambedakaranche Marekari Arun Sauri
- Ra. Dho.n Karve
- Nathu-Ramayan
- Nyayalayat Madhū Limaye
- Annasaheb Laththe
- Drushtadrushta
- Svatantryavir Savarakaranchi Shastrastranchya Waparabaddalachi Bhoomika
- Rakhiwa jJaga Wastusthiti
- Akshar Divali
- Lokamanya Tilak Ani Krantikarak
- Kalindichya Tīravarati
- Ambeḍkari Chalaval
- Kahani Subhashachandranchi
- Shdhata Shodhata
- Svatantrya Andolanatil Musalman
- Svatantrya Chalavalitil Shikh
- Lokasabha Nivadnuka : 1952 Te 1999
- Smaranarekha
- Brahmanetar Chalavalitil Dhadadiche Karyakarte Dinakararav Javalakar Samagra Wangmay
- Mahatma Phule Samagra Wangmay
- Lokmanya Tilak
- Keshavrao Jedhe
- Shodh Savarkarancha
- Shodh Bal Gopalancha
- Vyakti Ani Vichar
- Krantikarak Va Ambedkari Chalwal

Phadke's last six books from the list above have won "Marathi Literature State Award" (also known as Maharashtra State Literary Award).

Shodh Bal Gopalancha - historical work on the lives of Tilak and Agarkar, including their friendship and animosity, was one of the 177 books that readers chose in a poll of the best ever books written in Marathi.
