= Ramchandra Shripad Jog =

Marathi writer

Ramchandra Shripad Jog (15 May 1903 - 21 February 1977) was a Marathi writer from Maharashtra, India. He presided over Marathi Sahitya Sammelan at Thane in 1960.

The following is a partial list of Jog's literary works:

- Abhinawa Kawya Prakash (अभिनव काव्यप्रकाश)
- Saundaryashodh Ani Anandabodh (सौंदर्यशोध आणि आनंदबोध) (1943)
- Arwachin Marathi Kawya (अर्वाचीन मराठी काव्य) (1946)
- Keshawasut Kawya Darshan (केशवसुत काव्यदर्शन) (1947)
