= V. S. Pargaonkar =

Indian writer

V. S. Pargaonkar was a Marathi writer from Maharashtra, India.

He wrote twenty-five books, including novels and collections of his short stories, critiques, and essays.

He wrote short stories.

One was titled "Shevga veda jhala". Another was titled Kala Chakra, published in 1967. Another was titled Antarita. Another, one review work lists as Kalacakra.

== Authorship ==
The following is a partial list of Pargaonkar's books:

Novels:

- कालचक्र
- अंतरिता
- एक होता राजा
- अयोनिजा
- निगुडा

Collections of short stories:

- उजळती लकेर
- आविष्कार

Collection of essays:

- सय
