= Madhu Mangesh Karnik =

Indian writer

Madhu Mangesh Karnik (born 28 April 1931) is a Marathi literary activist from Maharashtra, India. He is a recipient of the civilian honour of Padma Shri (2002).

== Early life ==
He was born on 28 April 1931, in Sindhudurg district of Maharashtra. He was the president of Marathi Sahitya Sammelan at Ratnagiri in 1990. In 2006, he was appointed as the president of the Maharashtra State Literary and Cultural Board.

== Works ==
The following is a partial list of his books:

- झुंबर
- जुईली
- सोबत
- देवकी
- कातळ
- समर्पण
- पांघरूण
- उत्तरायण
- काळवीट
- लागेबांधे
- हृदयंगम
- संधिकाल
- सनद/सूर्यफूल
- माहिमची खाडी
- शाळेबाहेरील सौंगडी
- कॅलिफोर्नियात कोकण
- जगन नाथ आणि कंपनी
- गवळण आणि इतर कथा
- शब्दांनो, मागुती या (काव्यसंग्रह)
