= Narahar Raghunath Phatak =

Indian author (1893–1979)

Narahar Raghunath Phatak (15 April 1893 – 21 December 1979) was a biographer and literary critic from Maharashtra, India. He wrote mostly in Marathi.

Phatak presided over Marathi Sahitya Sammelan in Hyderabad in 1947.

== Family history ==
Phatak's ancestry is traced to a family which lived in the town of Kamod (कमोद) in the Konkan (कोकण) region of Maharashtra. His ancestors from a later generation shifted to Bhor, and his grandfather served as an administrator of that princely state. His father worked for the then government under British Raj in the northern part of India.

== Education ==
Phatak received a B.A. In 1915. He also studied art and classical music, the latter under Vishnu Digambar Paluskar.

== Career ==
Phatak began his professional career first in the editorial department of Marathi daily Induprakash (इंदुप्रकाश ) and then during 1923 – '35 in that of daily Nava Kal (नवा काळ), which Krushanaji Prabhakar Khadilkar had newly started in 1923.

In 1935, Phatak joined the faculty of Ruia College in Mumbai as a professor of Marathi.

He wrote articles on diverse topics in the periodicals Wiwidh Dnyan Wistar (विविधज्ञानविस्तार), Chitramaya Jagat (चित्रमयजगत), and Wiwidha Wrutta (विविधवृत्त). He often expressed thoughts which ran contrary to ones prevalent in the society at that time. His writings included some biographical sketches under the pen name Antarbhedi (अंतर्भेदी).

Phatak once wrote a detailed critique of Bal Gangadhar Tilak's biography by Narhar Chintaman Kelkar. He pointed out the irrelevant verbiage and errors in that biography, and criticized the biographer's occasionally displayed lack of comprehension of cause-and-effect in certain historical events.

== Biographical works ==
- श्रीमन्महाराज यशवंतराव होळकर : मराठेशाहीअखेरचा अद्वितीय स्वातंत्र्यवीर
- अर्वाचीन महाराष्ट्रातील सहा थोर पुरुष (1949)
- ज्ञानेश्वर आणि ज्ञानेश्वरी (1949)
- श्री एकनाथ - वाड्मय आणि कार्य (1950)
- आदर्श भारतसेवक
- Biography of Justice Mahadev Govind Ranade (in Marathi)
- Biography of Bal Gangadhar Tilak (in Marathi)
- Biography of Krushanaji Prabhakar Khadilkar (in Marathi)

Adarsh Bharat Sevak (आदर्श भारतसेवक) received in 1970 a Sahitya Akademi Award.
