= Vaman Malhar Joshi =

Marathi writer

Vaman Malhar Joshi (21 January 1882 – 20 July 1943) was a Marathi writer from Bombay Presidency, British India.

== Early life ==
Joshi was born in a Deshastha Brahmin family on 21 January 1882, in the town of Tale in the Konkan region of Maharashtra. After finishing his high school education in 1900, he studied at Deccan College in Pune to receive his bachelor's and master's degrees in Philosophy in 1904 and 1906, respectively.

== Career ==
Joshi served thereafter for a few years as a teacher in a nationalistic high school. (India was under British Raj in those times.) beginning in 1908, he also served as the editor of a nationalistic monthly Wishwa Wrutta (विश्ववृत्त). Soon after 1908, British authorities imposed a three-year imprisonment with hard labor on him for the “crime" of publishing in Wishwa Wrutta some "inflammatory" articles suggesting overthrow of the British rule.

After release from the prison, Joshi worked for two years as the editor of Lokamanya Tilak's daily Kesari (केसरी). In 1918, he joined the teaching staff of the Women's University which Bharat Ratna Dhondo Keshav Karve had founded two years earlier, (first as a women's college). He taught philosophy, psychology, and English and Marathi literature at the university. Later he became the principal of the university.

Joshi presided over Marathi Sahitya Sammelan held at Margao, Goa in 1930.

== Literary work ==
- Ragini (रागिणी) (1914)
- Ashramharini (आश्रमहरिणी) (1916)
- Nalini (नलिनी) (1920)
- Indu Kale Va Sarala Bhole (इंदु काळे व सरला भोळे) (1934)
- Sushilecha Dev (सुशीलेचा देव)
- Smruti-Lahari (स्मृति-लहरी)
- Neeti-Shastra-Pravesh (नीतिशास्त्रप्रवेश)

== Biographies ==
- Waman Malhar Joshi (Book by Govind Malhar Kulkarni)
- Va. Ma. Joshi Sahitya-Darshan (Book edited by Waman Lakshman Kulkarni and Govind Malhar Kulkarni)
- Vaman joshi
- Vaman Malhar Joshi : Vyakti-Vichar by Vishṇu Sakhārāma Khāṇḍekara

== Bibliography ==
- Datta, Amaresh (1988). Encyclopaedia of Indian Literature: Devraj to Jyoti, Volume 2. Sahitya Akademi. ISBN 9788126011940.
- Sen, S.P. (1973). Dictionary of National Biography. Institute of Historical Studies, Calcutta.
