= Sadanand More =

Marathi writer, poet and playwright (born 1952)

Sadanand Shridhar More
- Born: 25 June 1952 (age 74); Dehu, Maharashtra
- Occupations: Writer, poet, playwright, critic, historian, lecturer
- Writing career
- Notable work: Tukaram Darshan (criticism)
- Notable awards: Sahitya Akademi Award

Sadanand Shridhar More (born 25 June 1952) is a Marathi writer, poet, playwright, critic, historian, lecturer, and kirtan writer. More is a scholar of Sant Sahitya (saint literature) and is an authority on Sant Tukaram. He is currently serving as Head of the Philosophy Department at Savitribai Phule University, Pune, Maharashtra. He is a tenth-generation descendant of Sant Tukaram.

More has authored and edited many books on saints and social issues. He received many awards for his literary works, such as the Sahitya Akademi Award in 1998 for his book Tukaram Darshan. More is considered a thinker who enriched the cultural heritage of Tukaram Maharaj through his multidisciplinary endeavors.

Apart from his scholarly work specializing in reception on Tukaram, More is a career awardee from University Grants Commission (UGC), has written a doctoral dissertation titled Krsna: The Man and his Mission during 1986–89. He also wrote a two-volume Marathi book titled Lokamanya te Mahatma, which was translated into English by Abhay Datar. Historian Ramchandra Guha wrote the foreword, where he describes More's work as "... a colossal work of scholarship, at once very deep and extremely wide". Similarly in "Patriots and Partisans" authored by Guha, because of More's vast literary works, he describes him as a cult figure in Maharashtra and compares him to Partha Chaterjee of English writing. More also wrote some plays. While researching figures like Lokamanya and Gandhi, he learned more about theatre, and since childhood he was motivated by actor/singer Bal Gandharva. He went on to write a play on Bal Gandharva and his love life with Gauharbai, a classical singer from Karnataka.

On 10 December 2014, More was elected the 88th president of ABMSS (Akhil Bharatiya Marathi Sahitya Sammelan). He currently serves as a member of General Council and Advisory board on Marathi language at Sahitya Akademi.

== Politics ==
When asked about the current caste politics in Maharashtra during an interview with Sakal Times, More responded by saying that instead of coining new terms, "we must realize that we are all ultimately concerned with our respective livelihoods, and we have figured that caste is a strong tool to further our economic gains and that’s at the root of it." Similarly when asked about communism, his quick response was: "An experiment with Communism has failed in India and world over", but he asserted that it could come up with a new experiment in the future. In November 2013, he received threatening phone calls after making statements on Vallabhbhai Patel and BJP’s PM-designate Narendra Modi. He was provided with police protection following this incident.

Earlier in 2013, More criticized NCERT, an apex body responsible for improving school education in India, for not providing adequate information on Maratha Ruler Chatrapati Shivaji in class VII textbooks and publishing a "derogatory" cartoon in class IX book. More said NCERT has only glorified Muslim rulers of the past and has not provided enough space to Shivaji. He further added: "By giving such inadequate information we are depriving the coming generation of our country's rich history."

== Literary works ==
- The Gita: A Theory of Human Action
- Kr̥ṣṇa, the Man and His Mission: An Enquiry Into the Rationale of Inter-relationship Between Kr̥ṣṇa's Life, Mission, and Philosophy
- Tukārāma darśana in Marathi
- Lokamanya to Mahatma: An Interdisciplinary Study in the Transition of Leadership- in Two Volumes
