= D. P. Khambete =

Marathi writer

D. P. Khambete was a Marathi writer from Maharashtra, India.

Khambete wrote short stories, some of them humorous. He wrote 21 books.
