= Ramchandra Bhikaji Gunjikar =

Indian Marathi writer

Ramchandra Bhikaji Gunjikar (10 April 1843 – 18 June 1901) was a Marathi writer from the Bombay Presidency in British India.

He was born on 10 April 1843 in the town of Jamboti in Belgaum District.

He graduated in 1864 from Elphinstone High School in Mumbai, and started teaching in the same school three years later. In 1888, he assumed the headmaster's position in the Anglo-vernacular High School in Hubli, and moved on four years later to be an assistant deputy educational inspector for Belagaum district.

In 1867, Gunjikar became the first editor of the monthly Wiwidha Dnyan Wistar (विविधज्ञानविस्तार) which was founded with the objective of disseminating information on varied topics, including sciences, biographies, literary criticisms, and philosophical/ethical ideas. He stayed in that position for seven years to turn the magazine into a prestigious monthly. His proficiency in Sanskrit, Marathi, Gujarati, Kannada, Bengali, and English languages helped him in his editorial and literary works. His articles included ones on Marathi poetry, Marathi grammar, and Marathi as a language. He also invented a Marathi shorthand script.

Gunjikar became the first historic novelist in Marathi literature when he wrote the novel Mochangad (मोचनगड) in 1871. The novel vividly describes life in Maharashtra in the first half of the 17th century. He died before he could finish his second historic novel Godawari (गोदावरी) pertaining to Portuguese rule in Goa.

== Literary work ==
The following is a list of titles of Gunjikar's major works:

- मोचनगड (1871)
- रोमकेतुविजया (Translation of Shakespeare's play Romeo and Juliet) (1872)
- कौमुदीमहोत्साह (Translation of Bhattoji Dikshit's Sanskrit volumes titled सिद्धान्तकौमुदी concerning Sanskrit grammar) (1877–79)
- लाघवी लिपी किंवा अतित्वरेने लिहिण्याची युक्ती (1878)
- सरस्वती मंडळ (1884)
- भ्रमनिरास (1884)
- सुबोधचंद्रिका (A critique in Marathi on Sanskrit Bhagavad Gita (1884)
- सौभाग्यरत्नमाला (1886)
- कन्नडपरिज्ञान (1895)
- अभिज्ञान शाकुंतल (Translation of Kalidas's Sanskrit play Abhijñānaśākuntalam)
- रामचंद्रिका
