= Viththal Dattatreya Ghate =

Marathi writer (1894–1978)

Viththal Dattatreya Ghate (18 January 1895 – 3 May 1978), also known as Vitthalrao Ghate, was an Indian writer of Marathi literary and educational works, as well as an educationist. His notable works include his autobiography, Divas Ase Hote (दिवस असे होते) (1961), the collection of portraits Kanhi Mhatare va Ek Mhataree (1939), and school books, plays, and texts on education. He was the president of Marathi Sahitya Sammelan in Ahmedabad in 1953.

== Early life and education ==
He was born in Ghospuri in Ahmednagar district. He was the son of Marathi poet Dattatreya Ghate, who wrote poetry under the pen name Kavi Datta (कवी दत्त) or Dutt. His grandfather was Kondo Ranoji, a leader of the Prarthana Samaj.

After spending his childhood in Ahmednagar, he received his secondary and higher education in Indore. He held degrees in education from institutions in Mumbai and London. Other places he lived included Malwa, Gujarat, and Karnataka.

== Career ==
=== Writing ===
His book Pandhre Kesa Hirvi Manne (Grey hairs, green hearts) tells the story of old people who have developed love for natural things and the love remains until their last breath.

Ghate wrote poetry, at first under the pen name Madhukar. His poetry was published in the collection Madhu–Madhav (1924). He was a member of Ravi Kirana Mandal, a club of poets in Poona. He also wrote portraits such as Kanhi Mhatare va Ek Mhataree (1939).

=== Education administration ===
He worked in the education department of Mumbai district. He was the Deputy Director of Public Instruction and retired from his educational career in 1950.

== Notable works ==
=== Books ===
- Divas Ase Hote (दिवस असे होते), his autobiography (1961)
- विचार-विलसिते
- पांढरे केस, हिरवी मने
- काही म्हातारे व एक म्हातारी

=== School books ===
- 'Natyarupa Maharashtra' (1926)
- 'Nana Deshanti Nana Lok' (1933)

=== Portrait collections ===
- Kanhi Mhatare va Ek Mhataree (1939)
- 'Pandhare Kes Hirvi Mane' (1959)

=== Essays ===
- 'Manogate' (1966),
- 'Vicharvilasite' (1973)

== Personal life ==
His daughter Anaradha Potdar became a Marathi poet.
