= Vishnu Bhikaji Kolte =

Marathi writer

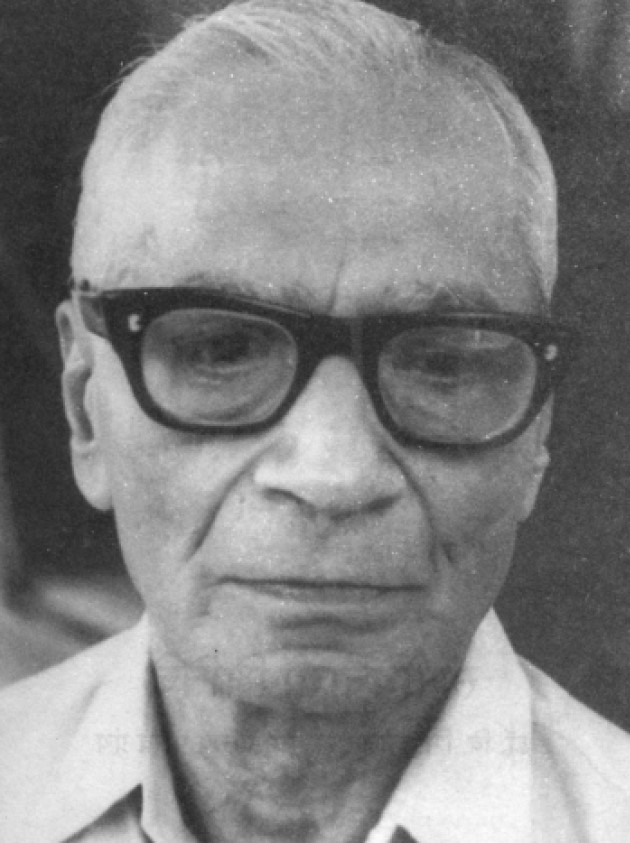
- Born: 22 June 1908; Narwel, Malkapur, Buldhana, India
- Died: 9 April 1998 (aged 89)
- Other name: Bhausaheb Kolte
- Occupation: Academics
- Known for: Research in Mahanubhav Literature

Vishnu Bhikaji Kolte (1908–1998), popularly called Bhausaheb Kolte was a Marathi writer and researcher of old Marathi literature. He hailed from Maharashtra, India. He served as Vice chancellor in Rashtrasant Tukadoji Maharaj Nagpur University.

== Life ==
Kolte was born on 22 June 1908 in Leva Patidar family in Narwel in Malkapur taluka in Buldana district in Bombay Presidency. His father Bhikaji Kolte was a farmer and a member of Satyashodhak Samaj.

Kolte received his school education in Malkapur and Khamgaon. He received his B.A. from Morris College in Nagpur, and M.A. from Nagpur University, securing three gold medals.

Kolte started his professional career as an assistant professor of Marathi at Vidarbha Mahavidyalaya in Amravati and then Morris College in Nagpur. He moved on to be the principal of Morris College. At Nagpur University, he became a member, and later chairman, of the Board of Studies in Marathi; a member, and later dean, of the faculty of Arts; and a member of the Academic Council and the Executive Council. He retired as the vice-chancellor of Nagpur University. He was also a member of the Board of Studies and the faculty of Arts of four other universities.

Kolte presided over Vidarbha Sathiya Sangh and Maharashtra Bhasha Sabha. He was a member of the general council of Sahitya Akademi, New Delhi during 1956-1961.

== Scholarly work ==
Kolte did pioneering work in the field of Mahanubhava literature.

He researched about 20 ancient copper plates and stone inscriptions in Marathi, Prakrit, and Kannada languages. He decoded literature of Mahanubhav pandits, which they had written in an obscure code language in the 13th, 14th, 15th, and 16th century. He wrote exhaustive introductions to his books about the researched literature.

For Kolte's scholarly book on Leela Charitra, the first known biography in Marathi, the All India Mahanubhava Parishad conferred on him in 1956 the title Vidyaratna.

Kolte authored a book on simplification of Marathi orthography. He was President of Marathi Sahitya Sammelan, the conference on Marathi Literature held at Bhopal in 1967.

== Authorship ==
Kolte's writings include over 250 research articleski and over 20 books. The following is a partial list of the books which he authored:

- Lavhali (A collection of poems) (1928)
- Marathi Santon Ka Samajik Karya (Critique) (1935) (in Hindi)
- Bhaskar Bhatt Borikar: Charitra Va Kavyavivechan (Critique) (1935)
- Swastik (A collection of poems) (1937)
- Mahanubhava Tatvadnyan (1945)
- Mahanubhava Achardharma (1948)
- Shri Chakradhar (Literary biography) (1952)
- Mahanubhav Sanshodhana in two volumes (1962 and '84)
- Sahitya Sanchar (Essays) (1965)
- Pracheen Marathi Sahitya Sanshodhan (Essays on medieval Marathi literature) (1968)
- Chakradhar Shevatache Prakaran (1982)
- Maharashtratil Kahi Tamrapat Va Shilalekh (1987)
- Marathi Asmitecha Shodh (1989)
- Snehabandh (Essays) (1994)
- Giriparna (Essays)

== Editorship ==
The following is a partial list of over 15 books which Kolte edited:

- Uddhav Geeta (1935)
- Sthan Pothi (1937)
- Rukmini Swayamvar (1940)
- Vachaharan (1953)
- Shishupal Vadha (1960)
- Leela Charitra (1978)
- Shri Govind Prabhu (1994)

== Honors ==
Kolte was honored with a Padma Shri title by the Government of India in 1991.

A Sahitya Akademi Fellowship was conferred on him in 1994.
