= Anant Kanekar =

Marathi writer

Anant Atmaram Kanekar
- Born: 2 December 1905; Bombay, Bombay Presidency, India
- Died: 4 May 1980 (aged 74)
- Awards: Padmashree

Anant Atmaram Kanekar (2 December 1905 – 4 May 1980) was a Marathi writer from Maharashtra, India.

He was born in Bombay on 2 December 1905.

== Education and career ==
Kanekar finished his high school studies in 1923 at Chikitsak Samuha Shirolkar High School in Girgaon, Mumbai. After receiving from Mumbai University a bachelor's degree and a law degree in 1927 and 1929, respectively, Kanekar practiced law for about four years.

Through publication of a collection of his poems in 1933 and a collection of his short personal essays the next year, Kanekar had established himself by 1935 as a successful writer. Leaving the legal profession in 1935, he worked during the next five years as an editor of, first, weekly Chitra (चित्रा) and then weekly Asha (आशा).

In 1941, he joined Khalsa College in Mumbai, and moved on to Siddarth College in the same city five years later, both in a professorial capacity. He stayed at the latter college as a professor for many years.

== Literary work ==
=== Poetry ===
- Chandarat (चांदरात) (collection); 1933

=== Short personal essays ===
- Pikali Pane (पिकली पाने)

=== Travelogues ===
- Dhukyatun Lal Taryakade (धुक्यातून लाल तार्याकडे) (concerning 1937 travels through Europe and the Soviet Union)
- Amachi Mati, Amache Akash (आमची माती, आमचे आकाश) (concerning 1949 travels through northern regions of India)
- Nile Dongar, Tambdi Mati (निळे डोंगर, तांबडी माती) (concerning 1950 travels through southern regions of India)
- Khadak Kortat Aakash (खडक कोरतात आकाश)

=== Short stories ===
- Jagatya Chhaya (जागत्या छाया) (collection)
- Wijechi Wel (विजेची वेल) (collection)

=== Movie dialogs ===
- Manus (माणूस); 1939
- Adami (आदमी) (Hindi version of Manus); 1939

=== Plays ===
In 1933, in collaboration with four littérateurs interested like him in promoting stage plays, Kanekar co-founded Natya Manvantar (नाट्यमन्वंतर). The organization successfully presented for some years several stage performances. Kanekar wrote a few of the plays --Nishikantachi Nawari (निशिकांताची नवरी) is one of them—and also performed in a few plays. He also translated the play " DOLL'S HOUSE" by Ibsen as "GHARKUL" which was probably best transformation of original.

== Honors ==
Kanekar presided over Akhil Bharatiya Marathi Sahitya Sammelan in Aurangabad in 1957.

Mumbai University holds a series of lectures in his memory.
