= Shrikrushna Keshav Kshirsagar =

Indian writer

Shrikrushna Keshav Kshirsagar (1901–1980) was a Marathi writer from Maharashtra, India.

== Early life ==
He was born on 6 November 1901 in the town of Pali (पाली) in Satara District. After finishing his high school education in Tembhurni, he obtained his college education at Fergusson College in Pune. He served as a teacher at Bhave School in Pune until 1945, and then joined the teaching staff of Fergusson College.

He presided over Marathi Sahitya Sammelan in Miraj in 1959. He died on 29 April 1980.

== Literary work ==
Kshirsagar wrote literary criticism, novels, and short stories. The following is a partial list of his books:

- Bayakanchi Sabha (बायकांची सभा) (1926) (Humor)
- Stri Shikshan Parishadechi Watchal (स्त्रीशिक्षण परिषदेची वाटचाल) (1933)
- Ḍô. Śhrīdhar Wyaṅkaṭēśh Ketkar (डॉ. श्रीधर व्यंकटेश केतकर) (1937)
- Wyakti Ani Wangmay (व्यक्ती आणि वाङ्मय) (1937)
- Rākshas Wiwāh (राक्षसविवाह) (1940)
- Suvarṇatulā (सुवर्णतुला) (1944)
- Saṅgeet Ekach Pyālā (संगीत एकच प्याला) (1945)
- Umar Khayyāmachī Phiryād (उमरखय्यामची फिर्याद) (1961)
- Wāde Wāde (वादे वादे) (1962)
- Bāyakā (बायका) (1962) (Co-author V. D. Kulkarṇī)
- Ṭikāvivek (टीकाविवेक) (1965)
- Ādhunik Rāshṭrakavi Ravīndranātha Ṭhākūr (आधुनिक राष्ट्रकवि रवींद्रनाथ ठाकूर) (1970)
- Tasabīr Aṇi Takadīr (Autobiography) (तसबीर आणि तकदीर) (1976)
- Samaj Wikas (समाजविकास)
- Keśavasut Aṇi Tāmbe (केशवसुत आणि तांबे) (1980)
- Śrī. Ke. Kshī. Wāṅmayīn Lekhasaṅgraha (श्री. के. क्षी. वाङ्मयीन लेखसंग्रह) (1984; posthumous publication)
- Strījīvan Aṇi Wiwāhawishayak Lekhasaṅgraha (स्त्रीजीवन आणि विवाहविषयक लेखसंग्रह) (1992; posthumous publication)
- Nivaḍak Śrī. Ke. Kshīrasāgar (निवडक श्री. के. क्षीरसागर) (1993; posthumous publication)
- Marāṭhī Bhāshā : Wadh Ani Bighad (मराठी भाषा: वाढ आणि बिघाड) (2000; posthumous publication)
