= Narayan Govind Chapekar =

Indian writer (1869–1968)

Diwan Bahadur Narayan Govind Chapekar
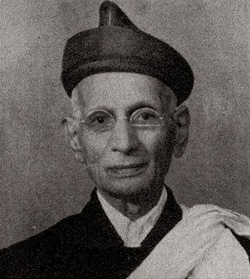

President of Marathi Sahitya Sammelan
- In office 1934 - 1935

Personal details
- Born: 1869
- Died: 1968 (aged 98–99)
- Education: University of Bombay (B.A.) (LL.B)
- Occupation: Writer, judge, critic

Narayan Govind Chapekar (1869–1968) was a Marathi writer from Maharashtra, India. The British had honoured him with the title of Diwan Bahadur which was customarily given to a judge who had the rank of First Class Sub Judge. Chapekar presided over Marathi Sahitya Sammelan held in Baroda in 1934.

== Early life ==
After having attained his BA & LL.B degrees from University Of Bombay he practised law for some time and then joined judiciary and eventually retired as First Class sub-judge. He then joined the judiciary in the Indian state of Aundh near Satara in now Maharashtra State as chief justice. It has been said that he vastly improved the judicial system there and brought it at par with the judicial system in British India.

The British had honoured him with the title of Diwan Bahadur which was customarily given to a judge who had the rank of First Class Sub Judge.

His literary works include the following:

- Peshwaichya Sawalit (पेशवाईच्या सावलीत) (1937)
- "Chiplonkar Yanche Jamakharch" (चिपळूणकर यांचे जमाखर्च)
- Chitpawan (चित्पावन)
- He also published his autobiography

Chapekar presided over Marathi Sahitya Sammelan held in Baroda in 1934.
