= Gangadhar Balkrushna Sardar =

Marathi writer from Maharashtra, India (1908–1988)

- Born: 1908; Jawhar, Palghar, India
- Died: 1988 (aged 79–80)
- Occupation: writer
- Known for: head of Marathi department of SNDT Women's University
- Notable work: see list

Gangadhar Balkrushna Sardar (1908–1988) was a Marathi writer from Maharashtra, India. He was born at Jawhar in Palghar district, a tribal region.

He served as the head of Marathi department of SNDT Women's University.

He chaired the Akhil Bharatiya Marathi Sahitya Sammelan literary conference which was held at Barshi in 1980.

== Works ==
The following is a partial list of Sardar's books:

- अर्वाचीन मराठी गद्याची पूर्वपीठिका (1937)
- अभंगवाणी प्रसिध्द तुकयाची
- संत वाङ्मयाची सामाजिक फलश्रुती (1950)
- महाराष्ट्राचे उपेक्षित मानकरी (1951)
- महाराष्ट्र जीवन (1960)
- रामदासदर्शन
- गांधी आणि आंबेडकर
- संक्रमणकालाचे आवाहन (1966)
- ज्ञानेश्वर जीवननिष्ठा (1971)
- रानडेप्रणित सामाजिक सुधारणेची तत्त्वमीमांसा (1973)
- आगरकरांचा सामाजिक तत्त्वविचार (1975)
- प्रबोधनातील पाऊलखुणा (1978)
- महात्मा फुले - व्यक्तित्व आणि विचार (1981)
- नव्या युगाची स्पंदने (1982)
- धर्म आणि समाजपरिवर्तन (1982)
- नव्या ऊर्मि, नवी क्षितिजे (1987)
- परंपरा आणि परिवर्तन (1988)
- The Saint-Poets of Maharashtra: Their Impact on Society (in English) (1969)
