= Mama Varerkar =

Indian writer (1883–1964)

Bhargavaram Viththal Varerkar
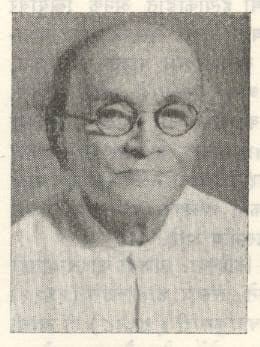

Member of Parliament, Rajya Sabha (Nominated)
- In office 3 April 1956 – 1964 (his death)

Personal details
- Born: 27 April 1883 Chiplun
- Died: 23 September 1964 (aged 81) Delhi, India
- Writing career
- Citizenship: Indian
- Occupation: Writer
- Language: Marathi
- Subjects: Laborers under the dominance of their employers and the plight of women under male dominance
- Notable works: Widhawa Kumari, Parat Bhet, Dhawata Dhota

Bhargavram Vitthal Varerkar (27 April 1883 – 23 September 1964), widely known as Mama Varerkar, was an Indian Marathi-language playwright, novelist, and politician. He served as a member of the Rajya Sabha and was honored with civilian and cultural honors including the Padma Bhushan, Padma Vibhushan, and the Sangeet Natak Akademi Fellowship.

== Early life and education ==
Bhargavram Vitthal Varerkar was born on 27 April 1883 in Chiplun. He completed his primary and secondary schooling in Malvan. In 1898, his father removed him from school and sent him to the Civil Hospital in Ratnagiri to study medicine as a "medical pupil". However, due to his physical frailty, he had to abandon his medical studies.

While at the Civil Hospital, Varerkar studied under the Marathi poet Kanhoba Ranchoddas Kirtikar. Through Kirtikar's guidance and access to his rare library collection, Varerkar read plays by William Shakespeare, Henrik Ibsen, and Molière.

== Career ==
After leaving medical education, Varerkar was employed in the postal department, where he worked for 20 years before taking up writing full-time. His literary work included plays, novels, short stories, and mystery fiction.

=== Playwriting and style ===
Varerkar began writing plays with Kunjavihari (1914). His works focused on spreading awareness on the lives and circumstances of common people in society. Along with full-length plays, he wrote several one-act plays. He also translated plays by Rabindranath Tagore, James Barrie, Henrik Ibsen, and William Barrett into Marathi.

=== Novels and translations ===
Varerkar wrote several novels in Marathi. Notably, he translated Bengali literature into Marathi, including works by Bankim Chandra Chattopadhyay, and Prabhat Kumar Mukhopadhyay, and short stories by Sarat Chandra Chattopadhyay, and Rabindranath Tagore.

=== Other literary works ===
Beyond plays and novels, Varerkar composed poetry, including Vijayadashami and Umaji Naikacha Powada, alongside songs written for his theatrical works. He wrote a four-volume autobiography titled Majha Natki Sansar, published across 1941, 1952, 1959, and 1962. He also produced a large volume of mystery stories and short prose articles.

== Public life and recognition ==
Varerkar served as the president of the Marathi Natya Sammelan in 1938. In 1944, he presided over the Akhil Bharatiya Marathi Sahitya Sammelan held in Dhule. He was later appointed as a member of the Rajya Sabha.

He received several honours from the Government of India:

- Padma Bhushan (1956)
- Padma Vibhushan (1959)
- Sangeet Natak Akademi Fellowship (1963)

== Death ==
Varerkar died in Delhi on 23 September 1964.

== Works ==
His works include:

=== Plays ===
- Kunjavihari (1914)
- Hach Mulacha Bap (1917)
- Sannyashacha Sansar (1920)
- Satteche Gulam (1922)
- Karin Ti Poorv (1927)
- Sonyacha Kalash (1932)
- Udati Parware (1941)
- Saraswat (1942)
- Jiva - Shivachi Bhet (1950)
- A - Poorva Bangal (1953)
- Bhumikanya Sita (1955)

=== Novels ===
- Sansar Ki Sannyas (1911)
- Vidhvakumari (1928)
- Dhavta Ghoda (1933)
- Fatki Vakal (1941)
- Mi Ramjoshi (1941)
- Ladhai Nantar (1947)

=== Major translations ===
- Sarat Chandra Chattopadhyay's novels: Chandranath (1938), Srikanta (Parts 1–4, 1939–1941), Birajbau (translated as Viraj - Vahani, 1943), Sheshprasna (1947), and Charitraheen (1949)
- Bankim Chandra Chattopadhyay's novels: Anandamath (1952), Kapalkundala (1954), Chandrashekhar (1954), and Durgeshnandini (1954)
- Prabhat Kumar Mukhopadhyay's novels: Ratnadeep (1955) and Satyabala (1956)
- Short story collections: Shodashi (1936) and Ekadashi (1944)

=== Autobiography ===
- Majha Natki Sansar (4 parts: 1941, 1952, 1959, 1962)
