= Waman Lakshman Kulkarni =

Marathi literary critic (1911–1991)

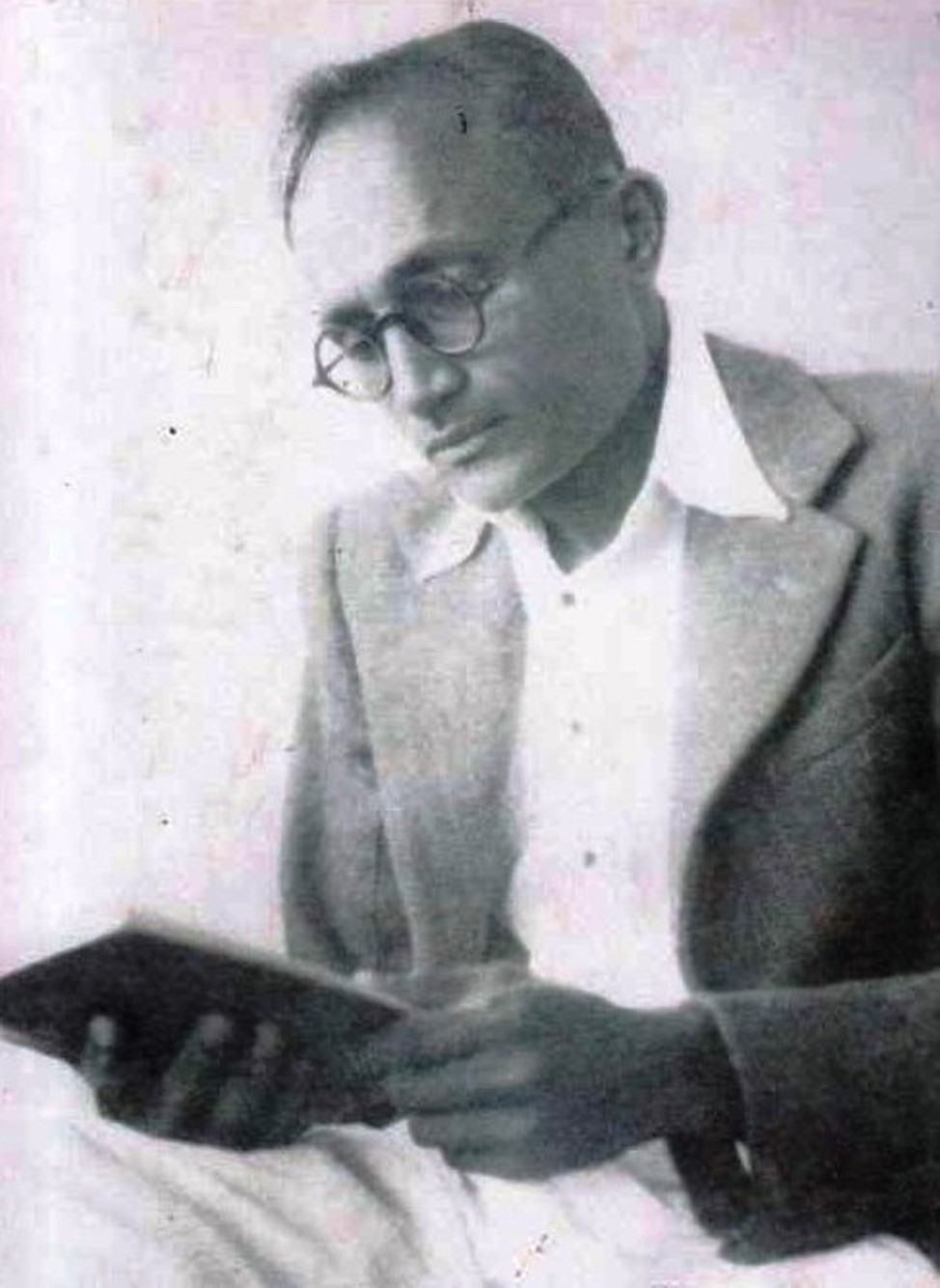
Pvt. wa. L. Kulkarni

Waman Lakshman Kulkarni (6 April 1911 – 25 December 1991) was an Indian Marathi literary critic from Maharashtra.

Kulkarni served from 1959 to 1979 as the head of the department of Marathi in Marathwada University, which was later renamed as Dr. Babasaheb Ambedkar Marathwada University.

The following are the titles of some of Kulkarni's critical works:

- वामन मल्हार: वाङ्मयदर्शन
- मराठी ज्ञानप्रसारक इतिहास वाङमयविचार
- तुकारामाची कविता
- हरिभाऊंची सामाजिक कादंबरी

Kulkarni presided over Marathi Sahitya Sammelan in Satara in 1965.

Kulkarni died on 25 December 1991, at the age of 80.
