= Purushottam Bhaskar Bhave =

Indian writer (1910–1980)

- Born: 12 April 1910; Dhule
- Died: 13 August 1980 (aged 70); Bombay
- Writing career
- Language: Marathi language

Purushottam Bhaskar Bhave (12 April 1910 – 13 August 1980) was an Indian writer, playwright, and novelist. Regarded as a pioneer of the Marathi new short story movement, his literary career spanned multiple genres, including short stories, novels, plays, essays, biographical sketches, film screenplays, and travelogues. He was also a noted orator and served as the president of major Marathi literary and theatrical conferences.

== Early life ==
Bhave was born on 12 April 1910 in Dhule. He spent his childhood in the Vidarbha region, and his personality fully developed during his time in Nagpur. He loved reading from an early age. He started writing at the age of fifteen with a short story titled Om Phas.

== Literary career ==
=== Short stories and essays ===
Bhave's short story Phukat was published in July 1931 in the periodical Kirloskar Khabar. However, his writing gained significant fame through his regular contributions to daily and weekly publications. His articles published in the Nagpur-based weekly Savdhan earned him widespread recognition due to their linguistic elegance and sharp brilliance.

In 1942, Bhave published a unique collection of essays titled Rakta Ani Ashru. He went on to publish several other acclaimed essay collections, including Waghnakhe (1961), Vitthala Panduranga (1973), Amarvel (1974), and Rangoli (1976). He also authored a well-known collection of character sketches titled Smarani (1974).

Recognized as a pioneer of the Marathi new short story, Bhave published a total of 27 short story collections. Some of his prominent short stories include Satarave Varsha, Simevar, Savlya, Swapna, Dhyas, Mukti, Roop, Pratarana, Putala, and Nauka. The stories within the Nauka collection, written against the backdrop of the Partition of India, achieved notable acclaim across the Marathi literary landscape. In addition to serious themes, Bhave effectively incorporated humour into his works, with his comic story Ice Cream being a notable example.

=== Novels and plays ===
Bhave published a total of 19 novels during his career. In works such as Akulina (1950) and Varshav (1955), he delicately portrayed the hardships and sufferings faced by women. His subsequent novels, including Aag (1961), Rohini (1962), Pinjra (1964), Maga Valun (1966), Sayankal (1968), and Vyadh (1969), focused on the depiction of human passions, desires, and the overarching influence of destiny.

As a playwright, Bhave achieved success with notable plays such as Vishakanya (1943), Swamini (1956), and Maharani Padmini (1957). He also wrote the stories for the films Saubhagya and Maza Hoshil Ka?.

=== Travelogues and autobiography ===
Bhave authored travelogues, including Uttar Digvijay (1964–65) and Chitod Yatra (1968–69). His autobiography, titled Prathamapurushi Ekavachani, was published in 1980.

== Public roles and honours ==
In 1964, Bhave presided over the Marathi Natya Sammelan held in Ahmednagar. Later, in 1977, he was elected as the president of the Akhil Bharatiya Marathi Sahitya Sammelan held in Pune. Throughout his life, he was widely recognized as an exceptional orator.

== Views and ideology ==
Bhave's literary works reflect his strong support for traditional Indian culture and foundational life values. He was a staunch proponent of Hindutva and was significantly inspired by Vinayak Damodar Savarkar. He was strongly opposed to thoughts and practices that countered Hindu interests.

Bhave actively opposed social issues like caste discrimination, viewing it as an obstacle to the unity of Hindu society. While he held Hindutva and progressive viewpoints, assessments of his ideology indicate that he was not a dogmatic or rigid reactionary. He advocated for individual freedom and opposed licentiousness.

== Death ==
Bhave died on 13 August 1980 in Bombay.
