= Madhukar Dattatreya Hatakananglekar =

Indian literary critic

Madhukar Dattatreya Hatakananglekar (1 February 1927 - January 2015) was a Marathi literary critic from Maharashtra, India.

== Early life ==
He was born on February 1, 1927, in the town of in Hatakananagle in Kolhapur district.

After his high school education in Sangli, he attended Sangli's Willingdon College to receive a master's degree. During 1956–1987, he served as a professor at the same college, also serving during 1973-1978 as the college's principal. In 1975, Maharashtra state government recognized him as an "ideal college teacher."

Hatakananglekar wrote 15 literary critical books in either Marathi or English. He wrote many articles in Satyakatha magazine. In 1986, he founded Ugawai magazine.

Hatakananglekar presided over Marathi Sahitya Sammelanat Sangli in 2008, at a relatively advanced age of 81. He died in 2015.

== Works ==
The following is a list of Hatakananglekar's Marathi books.

- साहित्याची अधोरेखिते (१९८०)
- साहित्याचे सोबती
- मराठी कथा : रूप आणि परिसर
- साहित्य विवेक
- विष्णु सखाराम खांडेकर
- साहित्यसोबती
- आठवणीतील माणसं
- उघडझाप (आत्मचरित्र)
- मराठी साहित्य : प्रेरणा आणि प्रवाह (संपादन आणि प्रस्तावना)
- वाङ्मयीन शैली आणि तंत्र (संपादन आणि प्रस्तावना)
- निवडक ललित शिफारस (संपादन आणि प्रस्तावना)
- निवडक मराठी समीक्षा (संपादन आणि प्रस्तावना. सहसंपादक : गो. म. पवार)
- जी. ए. कुलकर्णी यांच्या ' डोहकाळिमा ' कथासंग्रहाचे संपादन
- जी. एं. ची निवडक पत्रे ( खंड १ ते ४) (संपादन)
- भाषणे आणि परीक्षणे (आकाशवाणीवरून आणि वृत्तपत्रातून केलेल्या सापेक्षी परीक्षणांचा संग्रह)
