= Rashtrasant Tukadoji Maharaj Nagpur University =

University in Maharashtra, India

Coordinates: 21.146856°N 79.050061°E

- Former names: Nagpur University
- Motto: Vidyā Daiva Paraṃ Tamṛ
- Motto in English: Knowledge is the supreme destiny
- Type: Public
- Established: 1923 (103 years ago)
- Affiliations: ACU, AIU, NAAC, NBA, UGC
- Chancellor: Governor of Maharashtra
- Vice-Chancellor: Dr. Manali Makarand Kshirsagar
- Location: Nagpur, Maharashtra, India
- Campus: Urban
- Nickname: RTMNU
- Website: www.nagpuruniversity.ac.in

Rashtrasant Tukadoji Maharaj Nagpur University (RTMNU), formerly Nagpur University, is a public state university located in Nagpur, Maharashtra. It is one of India's oldest universities, as well as the second-oldest in Maharashtra. It is named after Rashtrasant Tukadoji Maharaj, a spiritual leader, orator, and musician from Vidarbha. The university is a member of the Association of Indian Universities and the Association of Commonwealth Universities.

== Vice-Chancellors ==
- Bipin Krishna Bose (1923–1928)
- Dr. Hari Singh Gour (1928–) (1936–)
- Tukaram Jayram Kedar (January 1938–January 1944)
- Justice W. R. Puranik (1944–1947)
- G. B. Kadam
- Vishnu Bhikaji Kolte (1966–1972)
- M. G. Bokre
- Bhalchandra Chopane
- D. Y. Gohokar (1975–1977)
- Vilas Sapkal
- Dr. M. A. Chansarkar (1985-1988)
- S. N. Pathan
- Siddharthavinayaka P. Kane (2015–2020)
- Dr. Subhash R. Chaudhari (2020–2024)
- Prashant S. Bokare (2024–2025)
- Dr. Manali Makarand Kshirsagar (2025–present)

== Faculties and Departments ==
The university is composed of the Faculties of Arts & Humanities, Science, Social Sciences, Home Science, Medicine, Commerce, Education, Engineering & Technology, Law, and Ayurveda, consisting of 39 Postgraduate teaching departments (PGTD) and two constituent colleges (the Law College and the College of Education). The departments and college buildings are spread over seven campuses with an overall area of 327 acres.

== Affiliated colleges ==
Its jurisdiction extends over 4 districts – Bhandara, Gondia, Nagpur, and Wardha.
