= Godbole =

Godbole (Marathi: गोडबोले) (Pronunciation: gōde-bolæ) is a Marathi surname that seems to mean sweet tongued but actually is a "apabransh" of the word "Gad" ie fort and "bole" ie "to write about" . These were auditors of the central administration of Maratha Empire placed in forts ie "Gad". The gave audit report of the fort to the central government. The original family surname is "Bhatt". Which per the profession of auditor changed to "Gad-Bole" which came to be pronounced as "Godbole"

Notable people bearing the name include:

- Achyut Godbole
- Kishori Godbole
- Mangala Godbole
- Manohar Godbole
- Narasinh Narayan Godbole
- Parshuram Ballal Godbole
- Rekha Godbole
- Rohini Godbole
