= Vishnubhat Godse =

Marathi writer

Vishnubhat Godse (1827–1904) (commonly known as Godse Bhataji) was an Indian traveller and a Marathi writer. Godse is best known for his travelogue Majha Pravas (My Travels), which is notable for the description of his "true and unique" experiences of the First War of Independence of 1857 during his travels in North India. It is one of the earliest travelogues written in the Marathi language.

== Journey ==
Vishnubhat Godse was a Brahminpriest from Vasai or Versai, a village near Pen, in Kolaba District of Bombay Presidency. His ancestors worked as priests during the reign of the Peshwas, but the defeat of the Peshwas in 1818 by the East India Company, a few years before his birth, meant his family had fallen on hard times. Godse therefore decided to visit North India in search of a livelihood.

Godse started his journey to North India on March 30, 1857 with his uncle. On July 1, 1857, he reached the Mhow Cantonment where he first heard news of the revolt. After that he visited Gwalior, Dhar, and Ujjain, but he could not find a way to make a living because of the changed conditions due to the revolt.

Godse subsequently went to Jhansi, where he was later appointed as the court priest by the Queen of Jhansi, Rani Lakshmibai. He was present in Jhansi when British forces commanded by General Hugh Rose attacked on April 3–4, 1858 and was able to escape from the city after it had been captured by them. He barely escaped from Jhansi after hiding in various obscure places while the massacre was going on. He later went to Kalpi to join the queen who had escaped there during the attack. He was also present at the Battle of Kalpi in May 1858. Later, he paid visits to Bramhavarta, Chitrakuta, Kanpur, Lucknow, and Ayodhya. He was in Ayodhya on the day of Ram Navami, i.e. April 11, 1859.

Throughout his journey, he had dangerous encounters with mutineers, company soldiers, and robbers, who took almost all of the money he had earned during his travel. In the beginning of 1860, he returned to Varsai via Sagar, Hoshangabad, Indore, and Nashik.

== Travelogue ==
Godse returned to Varsai in early 1860, but did not start writing his travelogue until 1883. It was a handwritten manuscript in the Modi script of the Marathi language that was not published until after his death. It was first published in 1907, 50 years after the mutiny, and given the name Maza Pravas: 1857 cya Bandaci Hakikat (My Travels: The Story of the 1857 Mutiny). This edition was edited by Chintamani Vaidya, but he gave the original manuscript to Bharat Itihas Sanshodhak Mandal in Pune. The original manuscript was published by Datto Vaman Potdar in 1966.
