= Maher (NGO) =

UN-registered organization in India

- Founded: February 2, 1997; 29 years ago by Sister Lucy Kurien in India
- Type: Non-profit; NGO
- Location(s): Center in Vadhu Budruk; Main Office in Pune
- Services: Homes for children, women and men, self help groups, general outreach, women empowerment
- Members: Current Members: 851 children, 761 women (including 280 mentally ill women), 290 men, 12,000 SHG members through 604 SHGs, 320 employees Total Beneficiaries till date: 48,000+ (approx. numbers)
- Website: maherashram.org

Maher (Marathi: My mother's home) is an UN-registered, interfaith and caste-free Indian non-governmental organization based in Pune. The objective of the organization is to provide shelter and support to destitute, exploited, battered women, men and children. It was founded by Sister Lucy Kurien in 1997 in the village Vadhu Budruk.

== Philosophy ==
Maher is an inter-religious institution which celebrates all religions and faiths. "Love is our Religion" is the core belief Maher is built on. The emphasis on interfaith is essential in everyday life, but shows especially during festivities and celebrations to promote peace, harmony and brotherhood. In November 2025, Maher celebrated the Hindu festival of light - Diwali - in a special way: people from different religions recited verses and prayed together.

Love is the religion that Maher believes in and lives by. Their mission therefore is to create secure and loving homes for everyone and enabling their inhabitants to discover the power within them and develop self-reliance. Raising kind and strong individuals by providing women, men and children with stability and unconditional love. Assisting members of impoverished villages in uplifting their communities, while encouraging the use of sustainable agricultural practices.

Further steps to follow the idea of sustainability that Maher is trying to take, include celebrating Holi with natural colors instead of using the common synthetic colors.

== History ==
=== The Beginning (1991) ===
1991, while Sister Lucy was working for the H.O.P.E organization, a pregnant woman came to her, asking for help. She believed her husband was going to kill her to bring another woman into his house. Sister Lucy couldn't help her, but promised to help her the following day.

I was brought up in a secure family environment and I was unaware that one night could make such a difference to the life of a woman"; "That very night, her husband, in a drunken rage, set her on tembefire. I actually saw the blazing woman and heard her shrieks of agony. We put the fire out and took her to a hospital but she died of 90 degree burns and with her died the seven-month-old fetus. I was devastated..

— Sister Lucy

After this incident Sister Lucy decided to found Maher, to help women in such situations.

It took almost seven years to get the needed support, but on 2 February 1997 in the small village of Vadhu Budruk on the outskirts of Pune, the first Maher house opened its doors.

=== Further Development (1997 - 2026) ===
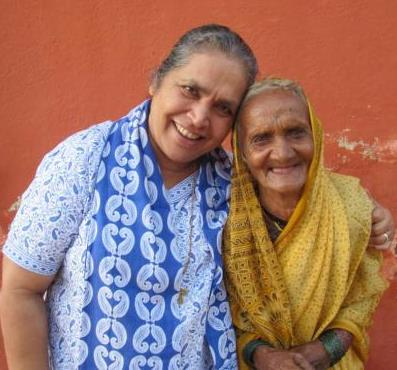
Sister Lucy Kurien (left), founder of Maher

Maher began with Sr. Lucy, 1 house, 3 residents and daunting odds. Today, Maher is served by a community of doctors, social workers, teachers, trustees, business people and volunteers, providing homes for over 13,000 full-time residents until now (5094 children, 6129 women and 1879 mentally ill/aged destitute men). In addition, thousands more have been reached by Maher's community programs such as kindergartens, self-help groups, village libraries, etc. Maher welcomes people regardless of their different religions, gender, caste, color, creed, or social status.

Over a period of only 29 years, more than 38,000 people have been impacted with Maher's aid programs. 75 houses have been built (24 for women, 41 for children and 10 for men) and Maher expanded to other states of India: Jharkhand, Keralam, Karnataka, Andhra Pradesh, West Bengal and Bihar. The aid for Maher also increased considerably. More and more people, mainly from Austria, Germany, the United States and the UK, came to support the project.

For her work at Maher, Sister Lucy was honoured with the Nari Shakti Puraskar at the hands of the then President of India, Pranab Mukherjee, DCCIA Award for Excellence in Social Service 2010 Global Women's Leadership Award 2011, Paul Harris Fellow, Vanitha Woman of the Year Award among other prominent awards. Maher and Sister Lucy Kurien have featured several times on Indian television, including the popular show Satyamev Jayate hosted by actor Aamir Khan, and also on Vatican Radio. In 2015, Sister Lucy was invited to attend the Clinton Global Initiative.

In May 2017, Maher was granted a "special consultative status" with the United Nations Economic and Social Council (UN-ECOSOC).

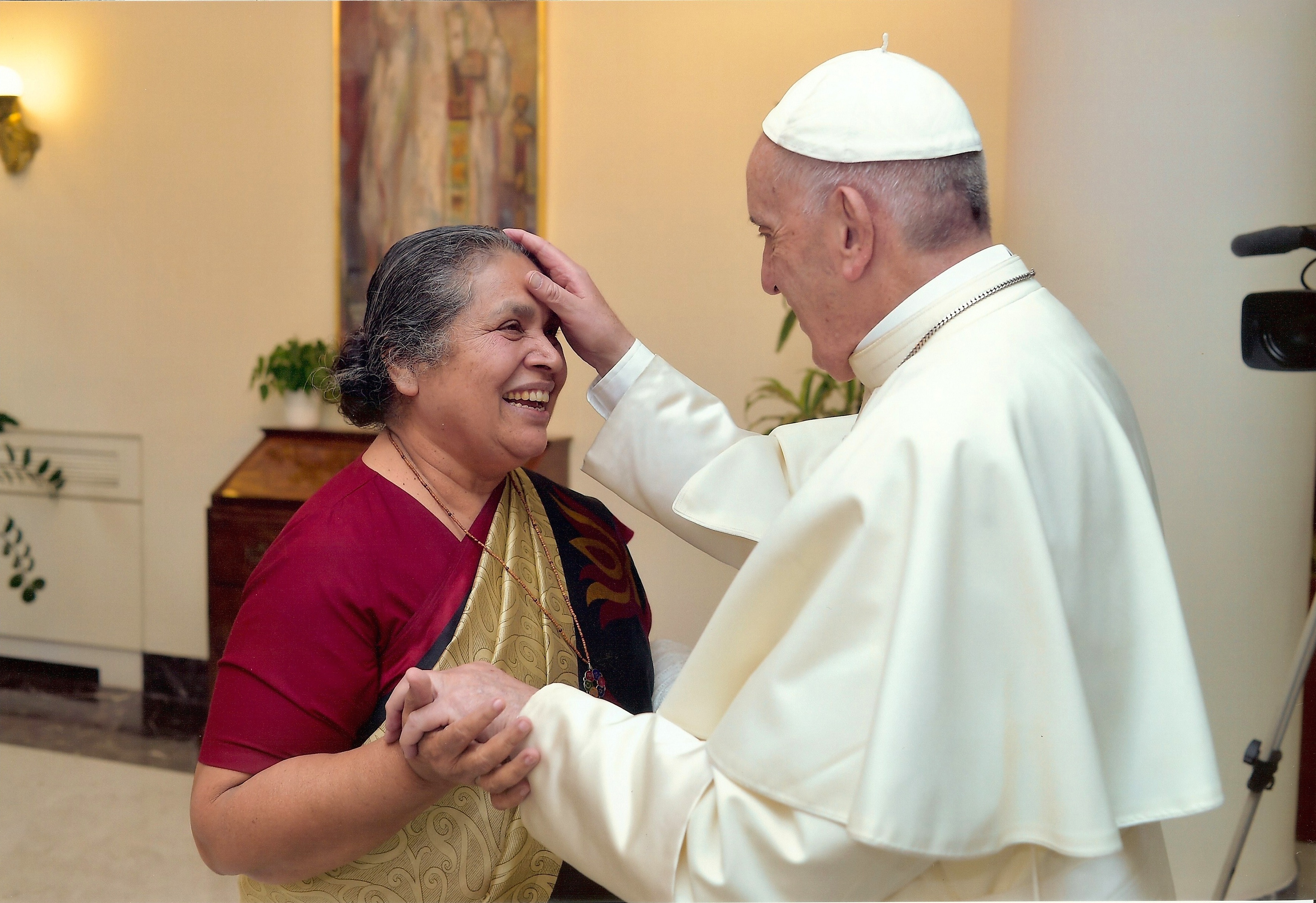
Sr. Lucy with Pope Francis

Additionally Maher founder, Sister Lucy, has had the opportunity to meet with the Dalai Lama in 2026, Pope Francis, Indian Prime Minister Narendra Modi and former US President Bill Clinton on different occasions. In 2017, Maher had its 20th anniversary celebration attended by 15,000 people from 10 countries. Former President of India, Pratibha Patil, chairperson, Lila Poonawalla Foundation, Lila Poonawalla and eminent Buddhist nun Jetsunma Tenzin Palmo attended the event on 5 February 2017 at Maher Vatsalyadham, Avhalwadi, Pune.

=== Maher Production ===
One main part of the Maher society is the production of handmade products. It contains useful items such as bags, pencil cases, jewellery, floor mats, candles, embroidered cards and hand-painted gift bags. Many of these products are made from recycled items e.g. Denim-Jeans and donated Sarees. All of these articles are made in the production units by the inhabitants of Maher, for which they receive a salary.

The main production site is located in the Vatsalyadham home and provides work opportunities for many women and men. Therefore, not only do they develop their creativity and discipline but they are also taught and encouraged to lead a self-sufficient life. The products are sold in fairs or during festivals and can be pre-ordered on the Maherashram-Website.

=== Recently ===
Events and festivities are captured in Maher’s catalogue from which a version is released every six months. More regular updates can be seen on Maher’s social medias (Facebook, Instagram) as well as on the Maherashram-Website which includes descriptions of the projects, the history, development and the mission of Maher.

The children are supported in their skills and strengths as well by receiving singing-, dancing- and instrumental- such as Tabla-classes after which they can showcase their abilities when performing during festivities. Additionally, Maher hosts dancing-competitions between the houses which poses the opportunity to exchange learned skills.

Another emphasis is put on the topic of environmentalism and climate change and its consequences. In order to educate both children and adults on the topic as well as make them aware of Maher’s steps to prevent pollution and waste regular presentations and interactive projects are prepared. Mahers projects to help victims of natural and anthropological calamities are also promoted through these presentations.

One other program targeted at the youth is the introduction of computer classes in order to further the children’s knowledge and teach at least basic skills about computers. "Gyandeep" started as a project for the children living in the slums of Pernephata to better their technical skills. Since then many have taken the MSCIT-exams and scored very well. One of the graduates became a teacher and is now teaching the children in the slums herself.

Projects for the general population also include minorities such as the transgender community in India. On 7 January 2023 some members of the transgender community gave a presentation on the difficulties of living as a transgender person. Maher therefore plans to build a house for homeless and indigent transgender-people where other members of the LGBTQ+ community can also find a welcoming home.

Other plans for the future include:

The expansion and extension of old and planned houses for women, men and children

Built of a Maher-Hall in Vadhu for events,

Ambulances to transport patients as quickly and safely to the hospital as possible,

Holiday home for grown-up Maher-children who want to stay with Maher for a while,

Home for elderly Maher-staff

And a "Youth-Hostel" in Pune City for Maher-Children who attend school/university in Pune City in order for them to have a shorter travel-journey.

== Structure ==
Maher's activities are grouped into different projects - the three main projects are Matruchaya (Marathi: loving shadow of mother), Kishoredham (Marathi: a children's place) and Pitruchaya (Marathi: loving shadow of father). The organization is led by women leaders - the Founder and Director Sister Lucy Kurien, the president Dr. Pradeep K. Sharma and the Secretary Dr. Nicola Pawar as well as an assortment of trustees, Hirabegum Mulla, Aniruddha Gadankush, Mercy Mendoca and Yogesh Bhor.

=== Summary of all Maher Projects ===
Projects for general population
SN	Name of the Project	Nature of the Project
1	Ekata	Free provisions to poor families
2	Pragati	Rural outreach programmes
3	Dnyan Ganga	Village libraries
4	Swachchhata	Vermiculture pits, Biogas plants & Toilet construction in the villages
5	Lokmangala	General outreach in times of natural calamities
6	Adiwasi Kalyan Kendra	Welfare activities for tribals
7	Karya Mandal	The central administrative office
8	Swavalamban	Self-help (micro-financing) groups in communities
Projects for women
SN	Name of the Project	Nature of the Project
1	Aadhar	Job placement for village women and youth
2	Parishram	Center for vocational training and production
3	Aashai	Homes for indigent and expectant mothers
Projects for children and youth
SN	Name of the Project	Nature of the Project
1	Gammatshala	Daycare-center for children of migrant workers
2	Vidyalaya	Coaching classes for the needy children in villages
3	Premalaya	Creche cum daycare-center
4	Ushalaya	Kindergartens in villages
5	Tantragyan	Technical-Training-Classes for youth

=== Summary of all Maher Houses ===
Homes for women
SN	Name of the Home	Nature of the Home
1	Mamtadham	Home for battered and destitute women in Vadhu Budruk, Pune, Maharashtra
2	Vatsalyadham	Home for souls abandoned by family in Wagholi, Pune, Maharashtra
3	Sukhsandhya	Home for destitute aged women in Wagholi, Pune, Maharashtra
4	Priyata	Home for mentally challenged women in Wagholi, Pune, Maharashtra
5	Aashai	Home for women (unwed mothers) in Wagholi, Pune, Maharashtra
6	Mamata Nivas	Home for mentally disturbed women in Raxaul, Bihar
7	Rashni Nivas	Home for women in Raxaul, Bihar
8	Apna Nivas	Home for elderly women in Raxaul, Bihar
9	Santoshi	Home for mentally disturbed women in Molakalapudi, Andhra Pradesh
10	Premalaya	Home for elderly women in Molakalapudi, Andhra Pradesh
11	Vishwadeep	Home for mentally disturbed women and their children in Miraj, Maharashtra
12	Navsandhyadham	Home for elderly women in Satara, Maharashtra
13	Maitrin	Home for women and girls in Satara, Maharashtra
14	Savedana	Home for mentally disturbed women in Satara, Maharashtra
15	Jeevanjali	Home for mentally disturbed women in Ranchi, Jharkhand
16	Shantiniketan	Home for mentally disturbed women in Ranchi, Jharkhand
17	Sarvodaya	Home for mentally ill women in Gomia, Jharkand
18	Anugraha	Home for mentally challenged women in Indi, Karnataka
19	Snehasadan	Home for elderly women in Ratnagiri, Maharashtra
20	Jeevan Deep	Home for HIV-affected women in Ratnagiri, Maharashtra
21	Sangam	Home for elderly women in Bijapur, Karnataka
22	Hira Niwas	Home for elderly women in Wardha, Maharashtra
23	Anchal	Home for mentally disturbed women in Hatiara, West Bengal
24	Shub Arambh	Home for mentally disturbed women in Kolkata, West Bengal
Homes for children and youth
SN	Name of the Home	Nature of the Home
1	Krupa	Children's home for small boys and girls in Apti, Pune, Maharashtra
2	Dayasagar	Children's home for girls in Bakori, Pune, Maharashtra
3	Gyansagar	Children's home for boys in Bakori, Pune, Maharashtra
4	Snehasagar	Children's home for girls in Bakori, Pune, Maharashtra
5	Tara	Children's home for girls in Ranchi, Jharkhand
6	Snehalaya	Children's home for boys in Ranchi, Jharkhand
7	Anand Bhavan	Children's home for boys in Ranchi, Jharkhand
8	Jeevodaya	Children's home for girls in Gomia, Jharkhand
9	Jeevodaya	Children's home for boys in Gomia, Jharkhand
10	Geethanjali	Children's home for girls in Ranchi, Jharkhand
11	Anand Balsadan	Children's home for girls in Kendur, Pune, Maharashtra
12	Ashakiran	Children's home for girls in Kendur, Pune, Maharashtra
13	Navjeevan	Children's home for boys in Thakarvasti, Pune, Maharashtra
14	Snehabhavan	Children's home for girls in Perumpilly, Keralam
15	Maitrin	Home for adolescent girls in Satara, Maharashtra
16	Snehasadan	Children's home for boys in Shirur, Pune, Maharashtra
17	Vishwadeep	Children's home for small girls and boys in Miraj, Maharashtra
18	Premankur	Children's home for small girls and boys in Ratnagiri, Maharashtra
19	Ashadeep	Children's home for AIDS/HIV-affected boys in Ratnagiri, Maharashtra
20	Balgruha	Children's home for girls in Ratnagiri, Maharashtra
21	Neelkamal	Children's home for girls in Wagholi, Pune, Maharashtra
22	Swagat	Children's home for boys in Wadgaonsheri, Pune, Maharashtra
23	Vidyasagar	Children's home for boys in Wadgaonsheri, Pune, Maharashtra
24	Sadabahar	Children's home for girls in Wadgaonsheri, Pune, Maharashtra
25	Premsagar	Children's home for girls in Wadgaonsheri, Pune, Maharashtra
26	Happy Home	Children's home for boys in Wagholi, Pune, Maharashtra
27	Neev	Children's home for boys in Mumbai
28	Mogra	Children's home for girls in Vadhu Budruk, Pune, Maharashtra
29	Chameli	Children's home for girls in Vadhu Budruk, Pune, Maharashtra
30	Jai	Children's home for girls in Vadhu Budruk, Pune, Maharashtra
31	Aboli	Home for adolescent girls in Vadhu Budruk, Pune, Maharashtra
32	Champa	Children's home for girls in Vadhu Budruk, Pune, Maharashtra
33	Rising Star	Children's home for boys in Vadhu Budruk, Pune, Maharashtra
34	Zendu	Children's home for boys in Vadhu Budruk, Pune, Maharashtra
35	Jaswanti	Children's home for boys in Vadhu Budruk, Pune, Maharashtra
36	Suryodaya	Home for adolescent boys in Vadhu Budruk, Pune, Maharashtra
37	Shining Star	Children's home for boys in Vadhu Budruk, Pune, Maharashtra
38	Jeevan Jyot	Children's home for boys in Sanaswadi, Pune, Maharashtra
39	Neelamma	Home for adolescent girls in Indi, Karnataka
40	Sevadeep	Children's home for boys in Indi, Karnataka
41	Snehakur / Snehanilayam	Children's home in Andhra Pradesh
Homes for Men
SN	Name of the Home	Nature of the Home
1	Karunalaya	Home for men in Sanaswadi, Pune, Maharashtra
2	Kinara	Home for elderly men in Sanaswadi, Pune, Maharashtra
3	Sandhya	Home for elderly men in Ratnagiri, Maharashtra
4	Shanti Niwas	Home for men in Wardha, Maharashtra
5	Snehatheeram	Home for elderly men in Ernakulam, Keralam
6	Punarjeevan	Home for men in Ranchi, Jharkhand
7	Premnivas	Home for men in Krishnapuram, Andhra Pradesh
8	Prashanti Nilayam	Home for elderly men in Krishnapuram, Andhra Pradesh
9	Madhu Niwas	Home for men in Kolkata, West Bengal
10	Samadhan	Home for men in Indi, Karnataka
