= Govind Gopal Mahar =

Indian symbol of Dalit resistance

- Born: Vadhu Budruk, Pune, Maharashtra, India
- Other names: Govind Gopal Gayakwad, Ganpat Mahar
- Occupation: Soldier
- Known for: Alleged performance of last rites for Chhatrapati Sambhaji Maharaj

Govind Gopal Mahar or Ganpat Mahar was a 17th-century soldier from the Mahar caste in Maharashtra, India, primarily known for his disputed role in performing the last rites of Chhatrapati Sambhaji Maharaj, the second ruler of the Maratha Empire, in 1689. Based in Vadhu Budruk near Pune, his alleged actions have made him a symbol of Dalit resistance, though Maratha groups challenge this narrative, claiming their ancestors conducted the rites. His samadhi (memorial) in Vadhu Budruk remains a site of cultural significance and caste-based tensions, notably linked to the Bhima Koregaon violence in 2018.

== Biography ==
Limited historical records exist about Govind Gopal Mahar's personal life, including his birth and death dates. As a member of the Mahar caste, a Dalit community in Maharashtra, he lived during a period of intense conflict between the Maratha Empire and the Mughal Empire. He is described as a soldier from Vadhu Budruk, Pune district, also known by names like Govind Gopal Gayakwad or Ganpat Mahar in some accounts. His life is sparsely documented, with most sources focusing on his alleged role in 1689.

== Role in Sambhaji’s Last Rites ==
Govind Gopal Mahar is associated with the claim that he collected the dismembered remains of Chhatrapati Sambhaji Maharaj, executed by Mughal emperor Aurangzeb on 11 March 1689, and performed his last rites in Vadhu Budruk. According to news reports and scholarly works, Mahar, defying Mughal orders, gathered Sambhaji's body parts, sewed them together, and cremated him, later erecting a samadhi near his own. This narrative, supported by Dalit communities, portrays Mahar as a trusted lieutenant of Sambhaji who acted courageously, symbolizing resistance to oppression.

Conversely, some Maratha groups and historians argue that the Shivale Deshmukh family, Marathas from Vadhu Budruk, performed Sambhaji's rites at the Bhima River, citing traditional accounts and a purported British-era document. This dispute, rooted in caste dynamics, challenges the Dalit narrative, with Marathas asserting their ancestors’ bravery and rejecting Mahar's role as a slight to their honor. The lack of definitive contemporary records from 1689 complicates verification, leaving the issue contentious.

== Bhima Koregaon Violence ==
The samadhi of Govind Gopal Mahar in Vadhu Budruk became a flashpoint during the Bhima Koregaon violence on 1 January 2018, triggered by the vandalism of a board on 29 December 2017. The board, erected by Dalit villagers, credited Mahar with Sambhaji's last rites, prompting Maratha residents to remove it, escalating caste tensions. The violence, occurring during the 200th anniversary of the Battle of Bhima Koregaon, resulted in one death and multiple injuries, with seven Marathas arrested for the desecration. The incident led to a statewide Dalit bandh and ongoing investigations by the Bhima Koregaon Commission of Inquiry, which has recorded conflicting testimonies about the event's causes.

== Contemporary Significance ==
Govind Gopal Mahar's samadhi remains a pilgrimage site for Dalit communities, with approximately three lakh visitors reported on 1 January 2020, reflecting his enduring symbolic importance. The Gaikwad family, claiming descent from Mahar, maintains the samadhi, reinforcing the Dalit narrative. However, the site continues to spark controversy, with Maratha groups advocating for the Shivale family's role, as noted in commission proceedings.

== Legacy ==
Govind Gopal Mahar's legacy is a focal point in Dalit historiography, representing resistance to caste oppression and historical agency. Scholarly works, such as Bhima Koregaon: Challenging Caste by Ajaz Ashraf, highlight his role as a challenge to caste hierarchies, while The Caste Question by Anupama Rao contextualizes his significance within Dalit political movements. Conversely, Maratha narratives, supported by some right-wing groups, view the emphasis on Mahar as undermining their historical contributions, fueling debates over shared history. The ongoing dispute, amplified by events like the 2018 violence, underscores the complexity of caste-based historical narratives in India.
