= Lucy Kurien =

Founder and director of Maher

Lucy Kurien krawuzi
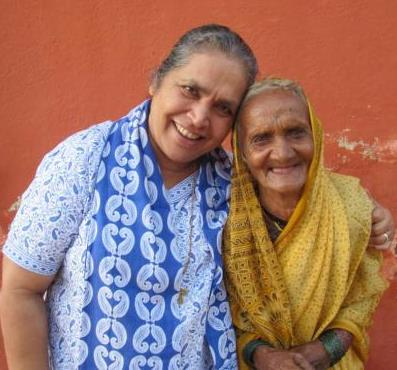
- Sister Lucy Kurien (left)
- Born: 1 June 1956 (age 70); Kolayad, Kannur, Kerala, India
- Occupations: Social Worker, Women's rights activist, Catholic Nun
- Known for: Founder of Maher (NGO); Founder of Interfaith Association for Service to Humanity and Nature
- Parent(s): Vacachalil Kurien (father); Maria Kutty (mother)
- Awards: Nari Shakti Puraskar; Paul Harris Fellow - Rotary International; Vanitha Woman of the Year 2016; Global Women's Leadership Award 2011

Lucy Kurien is the founder and director of Maher, a community and interfaith organization for abused and destitute women and children, headquartered in Pune, India.

== Life ==
Born in South India's Kerala province, Lucy moved to Mumbai to access better education when she was twelve. The city's slums were her first introduction to the conditions of the poor. At the age of nineteen, she decided she wanted to become a religious sister and joined the Holy Cross order, which focused on teaching and nursing.

However, she was inspired by Mother Teresa's work and felt called to be closer to the people she wanted to help, directly touching the lives of the poor. In 1989 she joined the HOPE organization, founded by Sr Noilline Pinto of the Holy Cross Convent to help abused women. In 1991, while still working at the Hope, she had an encounter that would inspire her life's work. A pregnant woman came to her asking for shelter from her alcoholic husband who she thought would beat her. Sister Lucy did not know where to send her since the convent did not take laypeople. She had to send her away but promised to help the following day. That evening, the woman's husband doused her in alcohol and set her on fire. Both the woman and baby died.

Sister Lucy was absolutely devastated. For six years she struggled to come to terms with this heinous incident and how she couldn’t help. She realized that she had to do something for such women, and the result was the founding of Maher in 1997 in Pune, Maharashtra. She had to single-handedly start Maher as she did not receive backing from anyone. A friend, Fr. Francis D'Sa, helped her with advice and also helped her to find some donors to start a non-Christian organization. Maher is 100% secular. Since its inception, Maher has provided safe refuge and rehabilitation to women who were suffering from abuse, starvation, or neglect.

== Founding of Maher ==
Sister Lucy established Maher to help destitute women regardless of caste, creed, or religion. It took almost seven years to get the needed support, but in 1997, the first Maher house opened in the small village of Vadhu Budruk, on the outskirts of Pune.

Currently Maher has 75 short-stay and long-stay homes in the Indian states of Jharkhand, Kerala, Bihar, Andhra Pradesh, Karnataka and Maharashtra. In total they house over 893 street children, more than 357 destitute women (including 126 mentally ill women picked from the roadside) and 82 aged/mentally ill destitute men. In the short-term, Maher provides immediate shelter and interventions. In the long-term, the community focuses on upending India's systemic violence, exploitation, and segregation—of men and women, but also of rich and poor. Maher has touched the lives of 85,000+ beneficiaries as of 2017.

In recognition of her services, Indian President Pranab Mukherjee awarded Sister Lucy Kurien with the Nari Shakti Puraskar (women empowerment) award on 8 March 2016, in New Delhi. Other prominent awards include the DCCIA Award for Excellence in Social Service 2010 Global Women's Leadership Award 2011, the Paul Harris Fellow and the Vanitha Woman of the Year Award. Maher and Sister Lucy have featured several times on Indian television, including the popular show Satyamev Jayate hosted by actor Aamir Khan, and also on Vatican Radio. In 2015, Sister Lucy was invited to attend the Clinton Global Initiative. In May 2017, Maher was granted a "special consultative status" with the United Nations Economic and Social Council (UN-ECOSOC).

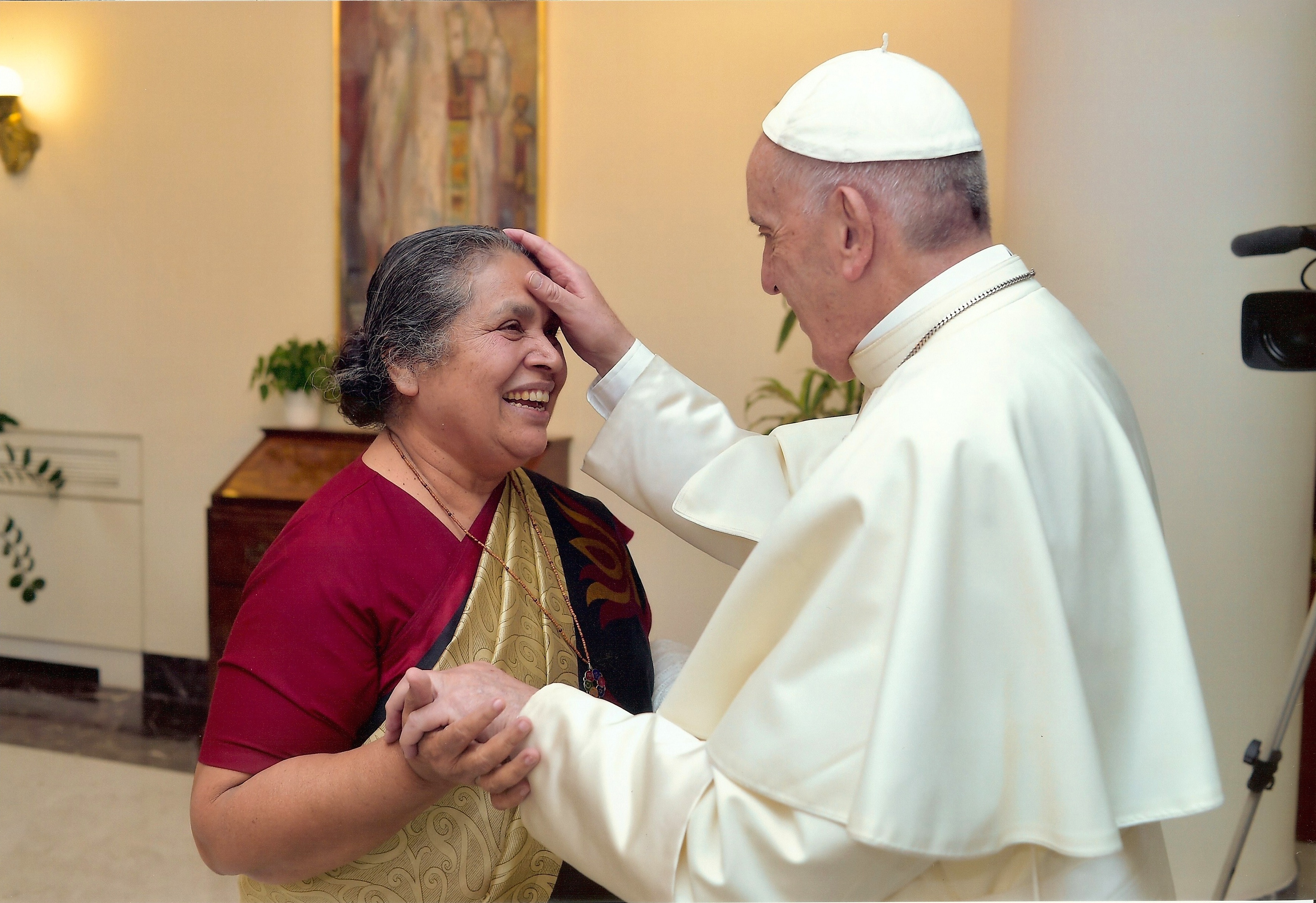
Sr. Lucy with Pope Francis

Sister Lucy has had the opportunity to meet with Pope Francis, Indian Prime Minister Narendra Modi and former US President Bill Clinton on different occasions.

== Interfaith Association for Service to Humanity and Nature ==
In February 2017, Sister Lucy Kurien founded the Interfaith Association for Service to Humanity and Nature in Pune, India.

As of October 2017, this new community has 220 members from 8 countries.

== Honors ==
- 2018: Neerja Bhanot Award
- 2018: Jijabai Achievers Award
- 2017: Sri Sathya Sai Award for Human Excellence - 'Unity Of Religions'
- 2016: Nari Shakti award
- 2016: Vanitha Woman of the Year
- 2011: Leadership Award, Global Women's Summits
- Paul Harris Fellow, Rotary International
