= Maza Pravas =

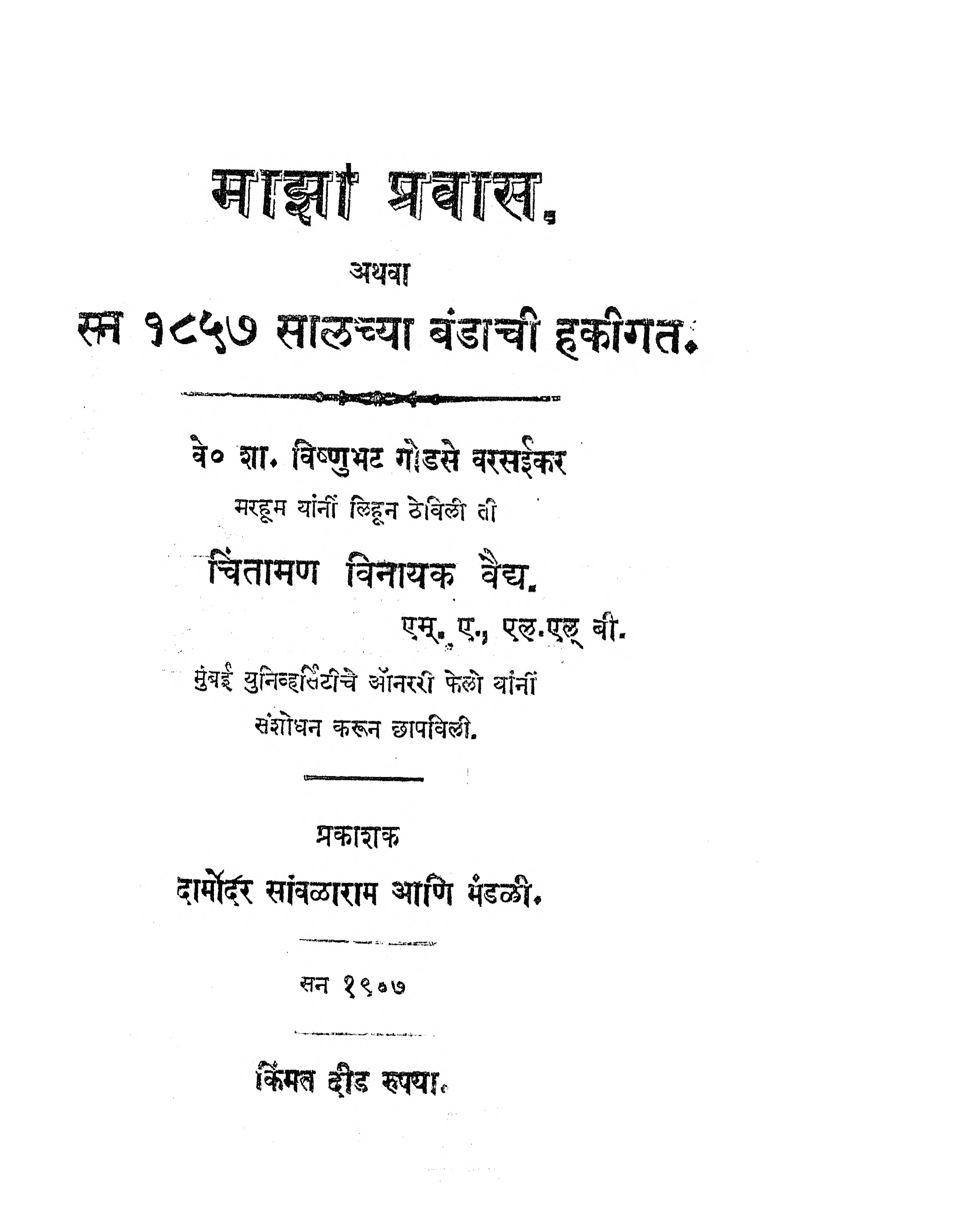

Maza Pravas: 1857 cya Bandaci Hakikat (or Majha Pravas, which translates into English as "My Travels: the Story of the 1857 Mutiny") is a Marathi travelogue written by Vishnubhat Godse, who travelled on foot from Varsai, a village near Pen (in what is now the state of Maharashtra, in India), to the central and northern parts of India during 1857-1858, and witnessed several incidents of what he calls "The Mutiny of 1857", also known as the Indian Rebellion of 1857.

During his travel, he witnessed the events at Mhow, worked for the Rani of Jhansi for a few months, and witnessed the defeat of Jhansi, visited Ayodhya, eventually returning penniless to his village. Apart from his encounters of the mutiny, he also visited most of the Hindu holy places.

== Author ==
Godse Bhatji, whose full name is Vishnubhat Godse, belonged to a rapidly impoverished family. He got to learn only a little of the shastra, the indebted family was in need of money. He got to hear that a major yajna was to be performed in the north, by Bayjabai Shinde. It was common during the performance of such yajnas that large donations would be made to deserving brahmans. He decided to try his luck, and be present for this yajna (it was the sarvato-mukha yajna). He travelled with his uncle, and a few others, returning after about a year and a few months.

== Origins ==
Godse Bhatji returned penniless to Varsai in early 1860. He worked as a family "priest" (purohit) for the Vaidya family in Pune. Chintamanrao Vaidya, then a young college student, grew fond of listening to Godse Bhatji's stories of his experiences of the events of 1857-58. Eventually, Chintamanrao Vaidya asked Godse Bhatji to write down his stories in a coherent narrative, and offered to give Rs. 100 for it, and a promise of publication. His dreadful experiences during the journey made him much more stubborn, but so deep was the fear of the atrocities that he experienced during his travel, he could not start his travelogue for about 24 years. He started writing it in 1883. It was a handwritten manuscript in Modi script of Marathi language. Godse Bhatji eventually wrote down his narrative in six notebooks. He died soon after.

== Publication ==
The travelogue was not published until after the death of Vishnubhat. It was first published in the golden jubilee year of the mutiny in 1907 by the name Maza Pravas: 1857 cya Bandaci Hakikat (My Travels: the Story of the 1857 Mutiny). This edition was edited by Chintamanrao Vaidya, who made some changes from the original manuscript, but handed that manuscript over to Bharat Itihas Sanshodhak Mandal in Pune. Chintamanrao Vaidya, who was an educated young man of the 1890/1900s, checked the narrative against colonial historical accounts (e.g. Sir John Kaye's history etc.), and found that it was accurate. However, since he was advised that the British government might find the narrative more provocative than desired, and because it also contained some "objectionable" (read erotic) material, delayed the publication for some time. Godse Bhatji's text was written in the modi script (used commonly in the period for writing Marathi), Vaidya got it transcribed into the Balbodh style of the Devanagari script. He got it published only in 1907, after editing the "objectionable" passages.

The edition by Datto Vaman Potdar restores all the passages that were removed.

Vishnu Bhat Godse's great great grand daughter, Sukhmani Roy Vijh published her English translation of 'Majha Pravaas' titled 'Travails of 1857' in September 2012. The Asiatic Society, Mumbai funded the research for the project whereas Pune-based Rohan Prakashan are the publishers.
