= Vasudeo Sitaram Bendrey =

Indian Marathi Historian (1894–1986)

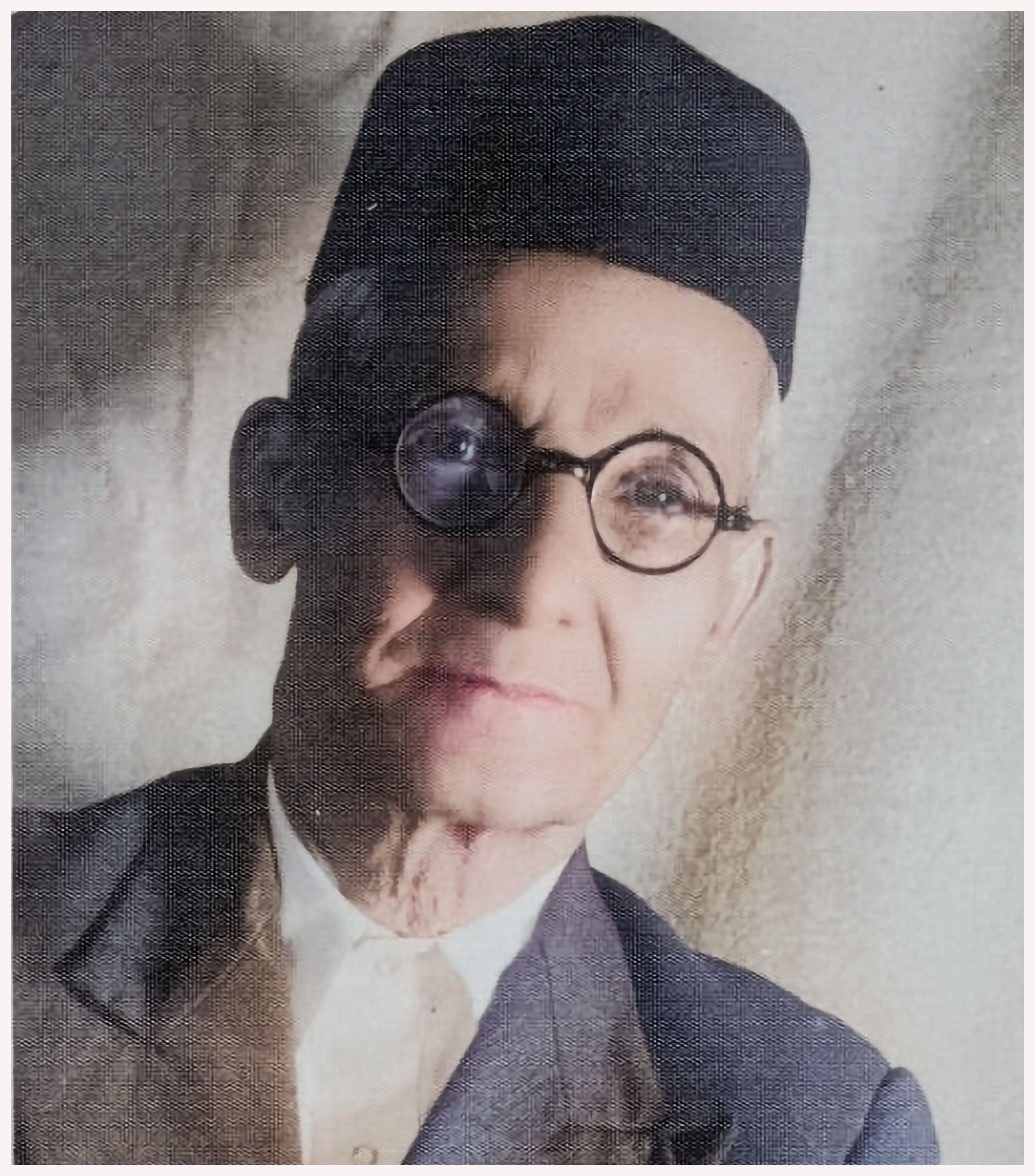
- Born: Pen, India
- Died: 16 July 1986; Mumbai, India
- Known for: History
- Awards: Maharashtra Sahitya Parishad award for best literature in 1977.

Academic work
- Institutions: Organizing Secretary, Indian Historical Records Communications (Pune) (1925); Secretary for Committees and Meetings, All India History Congress (Pune) (1935); BES Class II Officer (Pune) (1929–1949); Research Assistant in History (1949–1951); Research Assistant in History for Madras Government (1953–1954); Director, Itihas Sanshodan Mandal (Mumbai) (1963–1969); Sectional President, All India History Calcutta (1955); Director, Itihas Sanshodan Mandal (Post- Graduate Research institute); Editor, Bhartiya Itihas Ani Sanskruti (Quarterly); General Secretary, Editor and director, Maharashtra Itihas Parishad
- Website: http://bendrey.com

Vasudeo Sitaram Bendrey (abbr. V. S. Bendrey) was a historian, author, editor, translator and publisher in the Marathi language. Known as the Bhishmacharya of Marathi History, his research was dedicated to the history of Maharashtra. He wrote, edited and translated over 60 books on various history topics.

Most popularly, he is known for discovering the earliest known image of Shivaji. Before this discovery, the appearance of Shivaji was unknown.

His first biography was on Sambhaji, Shivaji's son and second Chhatrapati of the Maratha Empire; published after years of extensive research.

He also conducted research on the actual samādhi of Sambhaji, which is located in Vadhu Budruk village in Pune District, Maharashtra.

He is the author of the book Sadhan Chikitsa published in 1928. This book was considered to be his first historical volume, many contemporary historians considering it to be a must-read book for aspiring historians and researchers of Maratha history.

His other notable works included the books on Sant Tukaram, Rajaram I, Shahaji, Maloji. He was also a member of the committee which decided the actual birth date of Shivaji, also known as Shiv Jayanti, that was formed by the Government of Maharashtra in 1966.

== Early life ==
Bendrey was born in a Chandraseniya Kayastha Prabhu (CKP) family from Maharashtra. His early education took place in Pen, and he completed his matriculation at Wilson high school in Mumbai. At the time, the matriculation exam age requirement was 16, but Bendrey took the exam at just the age of 14 years old. For those two years, he took an unpaid internship at the offices of the railway audit. During his stint as an unpaid intern, he mastered shorthand in three months. His ability to master shorthand in a short period earned him a gold medal. He became noticed by his superiors for his work ethic, and they recommended him to become a second level gazetted officer. Mr J.G. Converton, the Director of Education, saw potential in Bendrey and encouraged him to pursue researching the history of the Maratha's as his career.

Among his prominent works were his two volumes on Shivaji, one volume on the life of Sambhaji, and works on the "abhangs" of Sant Tukaram. He retired at the age of 55 to pursue his passion in writing and researching Maratha history.

He lived for 92 years and spent all the time he had working on his research into the history of Maratha's. His last work was on Sant Tukaram; he died before the book was published. This task was completed by his son Ravindra Bendrey. He died on 16 July 1986 at his home in Mumbai.

== Sadhan Chikitsa ==
Bendrey started his research and study in Bharat Itihas Sanshodhak Mandal, Pune at a very young age. In 1928, he raised to prominence with the publication of his first book called Sadhan-Chikitsa, published in Pune. This book was considered to be his first historical volume as many historians of the time considered it to be a must-read book for aspiring historians and researchers of Maratha history. Sadhan-Chikitsa served as a concise introduction to Maratha history as well as a guide that provided the tools for conducting research in the field. Prof S.A. Dange, a prominent history researcher of the time, saw great value in following the principles of research laid out in the book.

== Journey to Europe ==
In 1938 his work and depth of knowledge in the history of Marathas was recognized by Lord Braybon who recommended that Bendrey be provided a historical research scholarship. This scholarship provided Bendrey the opportunity to go to England and Europe, where he spent all the time he could studying historical papers that were filed at various research institutions. Since he was dealing with documents and artifacts that were hundreds of years old, the prime minister of England gave him a special permission that allowed him to go over the material.

== Searching for the first image of Shivaji Maharaj ==
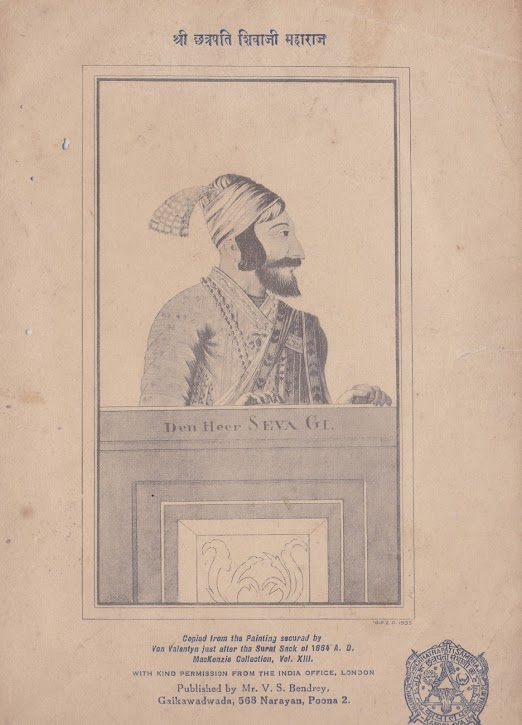
Portrait of Shivaji Maharaj found by Bendrey

He was often quoted as saying that history could only be written when one had truly examined the proofs that were provided, a view widely accepted by his colleagues. One example of this was his research into the portrait of Shivaji that was widely accepted in the early twentieth century. Later accounts of his research state that this earlier, popularly circulated image was not of Shivaji at all, but was associated with Ibrahim Khan, a nobleman of the Adilshahi kingdom of Bijapur.

While researching the life of Sambhaji — research he had begun by 1931, when he founded the Sambhaji Charitra Karyalaya specifically to gather materials for a historical biography of Sambhaji — Bendrey came across a portrait bearing the Dutch inscription "Den Heer Seva Gi" ("The Honourable Shivaji"), published in the Dutch compiler François Valentijn's Oud en Nieuw Oost-Indiën (Deel IV, Tweede Stuk, "Suratte. Levens der Groote Mogols," Dordrecht/Amsterdam, 1724). This material was connected to the collection assembled by Colin Mackenzie, which passed to the East India Company's library and subsequently to the India Office in London. Valentijn, who was born on 17 April 1666 in Dordrecht, was not himself present at Surat during Shivaji's raid on the city in January 1664; the portrait's artist is not named in the surviving Dutch text, which states only that the image was made "na't leven" (from life).

Bendrey obtained an authorised copy of the portrait through the India Office in London, and it was publicly presented at an event in Pune on Shiv Jayanti at Shivaji Mandir on 14 March 1933, arranged by Sahityacharya N. C. Kelkar, with D. V. Apte of the Sambhaji Charitra Karyalaya presenting the image. The event was reported in Kesari on 21 March 1933. The published portrait itself carried the following printed text: "Copied from the Painting secured by Von Valentyn just after the Surat Sack of 1664 A.D. MacKenzie Collection, Vol. XIII," together with "With Kind Permission from the India Office, London" and "Published by Mr. V. S. Bendrey." Bendrey priced the portrait at one anna a copy to make it widely affordable, and described it in his own contemporary publications as "Contemporary and very reliable. Drawn in 1664 A.D." The exact wording of the portrait's printed provenance statement was independently confirmed seven years later by the scholar P. K. Gode. The portrait's printed source reference, "Mackenzie Collection, Vol. XIII," has not been matched with certainty to any presently catalogued Mackenzie manuscript or drawings volume in the British Library.

During a later research visit to London and Europe beginning in 1938, Bendrey personally examined source material connected with the portrait at the India Office Library, including Valentijn's fourth volume, and verified his earlier findings. This portrait subsequently became the basis for the oil portrait of Shivaji painted by artist G. Kamble, who in a letter to Bendrey dated 8 January 1988 wrote that Babasaheb Purandare had supplied him with the original line-sketch on Bendrey's authority; Kamble studied it for five years before completing the oil portrait, which was presented to the Government of Maharashtra on 15 August 1974. V. S. Bendrey also authored two books on Shivaji, published in 1970.

== The 1938 London Research and the Bhavani Sword ==
While conducting research in London in 1938, Bendrey remained in active contact with the Bharat Itihas Sanshodhak Mandal in Pune. In June 1938 he sent the Mandal a research note on the Bhavani sword of Shivaji from London; a fellow researcher wrote to him pointing out that no contemporary evidence for the sword survived apart from three verses by the poet Hari Kavi, and Bendrey subsequently acknowledged the strength of this evidence in his own published work. Bendrey's resulting article, "The Bhavani Sword of Shivaji the Great," was published in the Journal of the Royal Society of Arts in October 1938, using a photocopy of the relevant manuscript page supplied by P. K. Gode. The article prompted a published response two weeks later from Chas. E. Lee in the same journal, concerning the reading of the sword's inscription. Writing in 2024, historian Andrew Halladay noted that Bendrey had correctly interpreted the sword's inscription when he drew attention to it in 1938.

== Work on Sambhaji ==
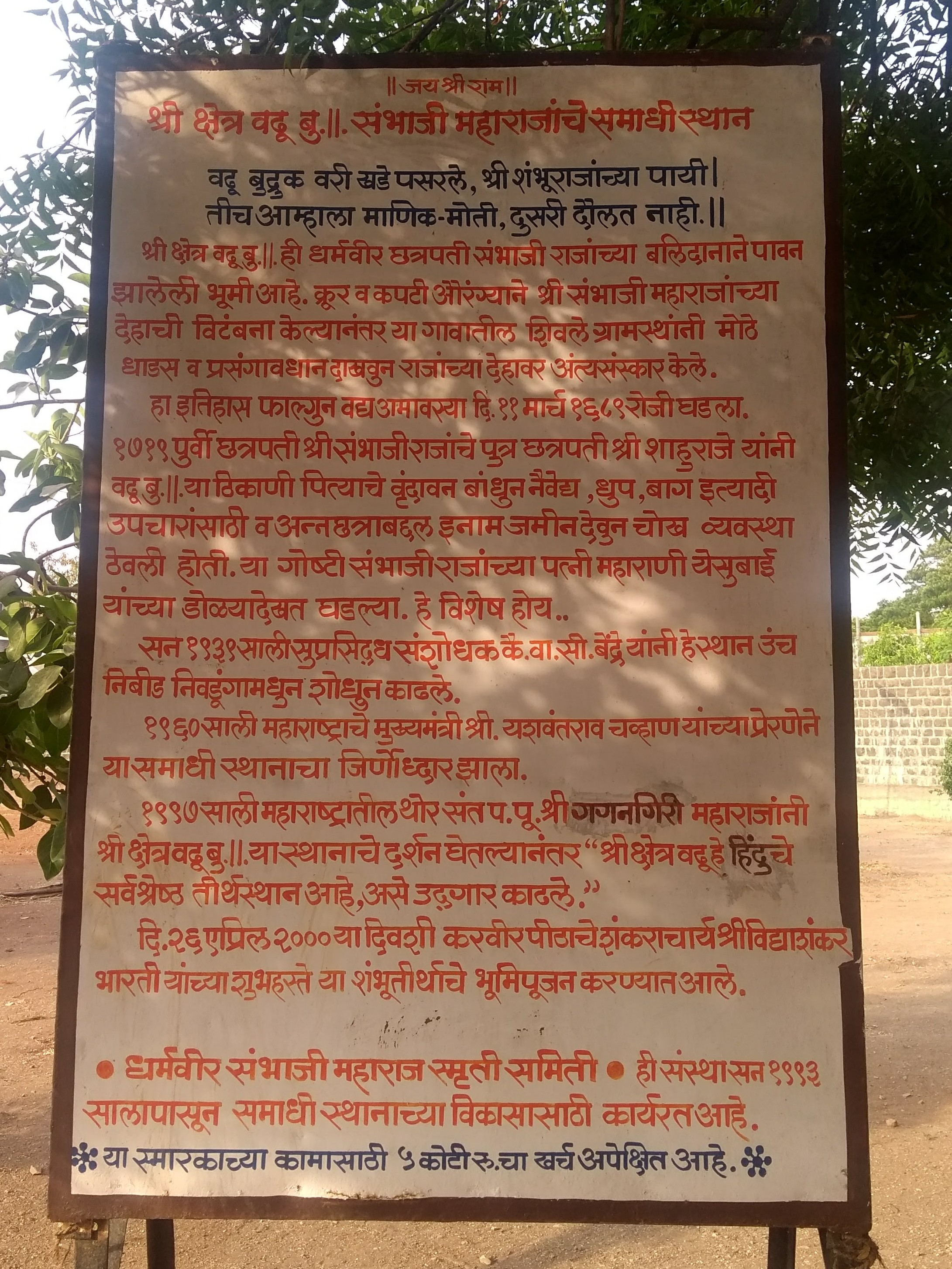
Display board at Vadhu Budruk

For years it was believed that Sambhaji's death and samadhi was located in Tulapur but Bendrey's research led him to prove that the true location of Sambhaji's samadhi was in Vadhu Budruk (near Pune). He went to the location of Sambhaji's samadhi and discovered that it was in a state where nature had overrun it. He and his fellow historians cleaned the place to find the "Vrindavan'' of Sambhaji. Every year, in the month of March during the new moon (Sambhaji's death day) a big celebration is held in Vadhu to commemorate the life of Sambhaji. In 1999, Sambhaji's biography was also republished for the 3rd time and was released in Vadhu.

== Coronation of Shivaji ==
The coronation of Shivaji 350 years ago holds immense significance in the religious, social, national, and constitutional domains of Maharashtra. Historians did not have precise information about this historic event until Bendrey discovered the Sanskrit manuscript "Shivarajyabhishek Prayogah" written by Gagabhatta in 1943, unveiling this long-lost treasure. Through extensive study of the grandeur and importance of the coronation ceremony, Bendrey published it in Marathi and English, making it accessible to the people of Maharashtra and beyond. The significance of Shivaji's coronation event lies in the unification of Maharashtra, the establishment of the Maratha Empire, and the attainment of independence for Maharashtra.

== The 1967 Publication of Malojiraje Aani Shahaji Maharaj ==
Bendrey's book Malojiraje Aani Shahaji Maharaj ("Maloji Raje and Shahaji Maharaj") was formally released at a publication ceremony at Rangmandir, Naigaon, Mumbai, in early July 1967 (sources consulted give the date as either 2 or 3 July; this should be confirmed against the original printed programme or contemporary press before publishing a specific date). The book was presided over and released by Yashwantrao Chavan, then a senior Indian cabinet minister and former Chief Minister of Maharashtra, at Bendrey's personal request. Chavan's speech at the event, recalling Bendrey's decades of source-based research and urging him to continue writing on the period preceding Shivaji, was later reprinted in Chavan's own book of collected speeches, Yugantar.

== Life at Peshwa and Thanjavur Daftar ==
In 1948, in recognition of V.S. Bendrey's achievements, the Government of India nominated him to be the Director of Research at the Peshwa Daftar. At the Peshwa Daftar, Bendrey took on the complicated task of cataloging by subject and period nearly 40 million historical documents written in Modi script. He developed the methodology for cataloging and wrote a book on how to create a one-line catalog called "Alienation Office Records and Poona Daftar (Pub 1950)" that would help others to carry on the cataloging process; this book is still in use today by researchers and catalogers. Further, his book called "Report on the Peshwa Daftar or guide to the records" has also proved to be useful to researchers.

The Daftar in Thanjavur was also in a bad shape; the then chief minister of Tamil Nadu Shri Rajgopalachari, having heard of V.S. Bendrey's knowledge and success at the Pune Daftar, asked him to help catalogue the disarray of historical documents at the Thanjavur Daftar in 1950. He was successful at this task and was recognised by Shri Rajgopalchari.

== Working in various history councils in Maharashtra ==
In 1963 he joined the Mumbai Itihas mandal as Director at the same time he served as the CEO of the Maharashtra Aitihasik Parishad. Between 1966 and 1968 he was responsible for organizing three conventions, in his five-year term he was responsible for the publication of 14 books and 19 publications of the quarterly journal called "Itihas ani Sanskruti". Further for the professor community he conducted classes on how to conduct historical research and writing. He also went to universities such as Pune, Mumbai, Kolhapur, Marathwada and Nagpur to conduct conventions on Maratha history. He also played an advisory role in the Indian historical records commission and the All India history Congress. He was also awarded recognition awards for the biographies of the Bhonsle dynasty members consisting Maloji, Shahaji, Sambhaji, Shivaji and Rajaram I.

He contributed to the development of Mumbai Marathi Grantha Sangrahalaya during his stay in Mumbai. Between 1926 and 1975 he wrote more than 60 books in Marathi and English. He was not only an accomplished historian but also an avid writer and storyteller. His first book "Stenography for India" was published in 1923 and his last book before his death was "Rajaram" in 1975. All his life VS Bendrey was very much interested in the life and compositions of Sant Tukaram for 30 to 35 years he wrote and published 8 to 9 books on Sant Tukaram, in his final years he was in the process of completing "Tukaram Gatha" the only thing that was left was the writing of chapters of Introduction when he died. After his death his son Ravindra Bendrey completed the Introduction in 2003 and published the book called "Tukaramache Aprakashit Abhang" (Translated as Tukaram's Unpublished Hymns).

== Social activities ==
V.S. Bendrey in his lifetime also took on social issues in Indian life and took an active role in the anti-dowry movement and tried to make people aware of how a Hindu marriage was to be conducted in the true historical ways which did not involve the taking of dowry. He was also involved in the Brotherhood Scout movement and Vidyarthi Sanghatana. His books are available for one and all to read in various libraries in the world. The Government of Maharashtra has given his name to one of the squares in Mumbai.

== Personal life ==
He was known as Dada to everyone, being a very family oriented person he managed to take care of his family needs while undertaking research projects in the history of Maharashtra. He married Kamlabai Parkar who hailed from Baroda. He had a vast family of 4 sons and 7 daughters. He was very well supported by his wife in all his endeavours. He also had a lot of friends, some of his friends were Sahitya Samrat N.C. Kelkar, Com Dange, Prabhodankar Thakre, CD Deshmukh, N.R. Phatak, Historian D. V. Potdar, Karmaveer Bhaurav Patil, Chief Minister Yashwantrao Chavan, Justice Ranade, V.S. Khare, VK Rajwade, Historian Shejwalkar, Historian Setu Madhav Pagdi, Prime Minister Pandit Jawarlal Nehru also expressed his respect for the accomplishments of V.S. Bendrey. Rajgopalacharya the chief minister of Madras had also appreciated the work of V.S. Bendrey.

== V. S. Bendrey Medal ==
The 'Itihasacharya Va. Si. Bendrey Memorial Trust' awards 'V.S. Bendrey Gold Medal' for emerging historian with best PhD thesis on history every year in Savitribai Phule Pune University, Pune.

== Translation Work ==
V.S. Bendrey translated literature in other languages (especially Sanskrit) into Marathi, including works such as:

- Shivrajabhishek Prayoga, Author: Gagabhatta (from Sanskrit)
- Rajaramcharitam, Author: Keshav Pandit (from Sanskrit)
- Dandnitiprakaranam, Author: Keshav Pandit (from Sanskrit)

== Editing Work ==
Bendrey's impact in book editing is transforming raw historical manuscripts into polished literary gems. With attention to detail, they refine structure, language, and coherence, elevating the reading experience. Their expertise nurtures authors' voices while enhancing readability, ensuring every page engages and resonates. Through their editorial skills, Bendrey crafts books that captivate, inform, and inspire readers. Some of his editing work include many books as listed below.

- Vijapurchi Adilshahi (original Busatin-us-salatin)
- Mantrageeta (by Sant Tukaram)

== Publication Work ==
Around year 1950, Bendrey has established his own publication firm to published his work along with other historian's work too. It was named as "Bendrey Aitihasik Sahitya Prakashan". Under the same name he published his edited work on Sant Tukaram called "Mantrageeta".

== Legacy and Scholarly reception ==
Bendrey's editions of historical source material and his research findings have continued to be cited by historians in India and internationally, across several distinct fields.

Shivaji's coronation and political identity. His edition of Coronation of Shivaji the Great (1960) has been used by scholars including Sheldon Pollock, Bihani Sarkar, James W. Laine, Jaume Aurell, in a comparative study of medieval self-coronation rituals worldwide, and Piotr Borek. It was reviewed on publication by K. K. Raja in Annals of Oriental Research (1961), who praised its "thorough and well-documented" preface while noting uncorrected scribal errors in the Sanskrit text.

Sanskrit sources and Maratha political history. His edition of Keshava Pandita's Rājārāmacarita (1931) was described by Jadunath Sarkar as making possible, for the first time, "a correct and intimate account" of Rajaram's journey from Raigad to Jinji, and has since been used by André Wink and Audrey Truschke, who cited Bendrey's introduction directly in her study of Sanskrit historical narrative. His edition of Keshava Pandita's Daṇḍanītiprakaraṇam (1943) — reviewed on publication by John Brough in the Journal of the Royal Asiatic Society — has been used in studies of Maratha-era penal and legal practice by Sumit Guha and L. Gopal.

Documentary source collections. Documents published in his multi-volume Maharashtracha Itihasachi Sadhane (1966–67) have been used as primary sources across several fields of social and economic history: by Rosalind O'Hanlon in studies of early modern western Indian scholarly and legal networks; by Sumit Guha in an environmental history of grazing land and forest use near Pune; by Laurence W. Preston in a study of land tenure and the Dev family of Cincvad; and by G. T. Kulkarni in studies of Hindu officials under the Deccan sultanates. A specific conclusion from his Chhatrapati Sambhaji (1960) — that Shivaji's wife Sagunabai belonged to the Palkar family and was a niece of Netaji Palkar – was cited by P. L. Saswadkar in a 1974 article on Netaji Palkar's career.

Epigraphy and chronology. His 1944 work A Study of Muslim Inscriptions was reviewed shortly after publication by A. S. Tritton in the Journal of the Royal Asiatic Society. It has since been used in inscriptional and chronological studies by Jamsheed K. Choksy and M. Usman Hasan, Pushkar Sohoni and William Kwiatkowski, and Mohit Manohar in a 2025 study of Persianate calendrical sources. The Encyclopaedia Iranica credits him with compiling "a chronological list of inscriptions ... with a brief description of their contents and an exhaustive introduction covering all aspects of epigraphical research." His reconstruction of the Ilāhī calendar in Tārīkh-i-Ilāhī was used by L. N. Kukuranov to date coins of Murad Bakhsh, and was discussed in detail by S. R. Sarma in an internationally published study of Persian-Sanskrit astronomical lexica, which noted that Bendrey "confirm[ed] this on the basis of actual dates recorded in the Akbarnāma."

Bhakti and Sufi studies. Bendrey's 1958 theory identifying a historical Muslim figure, Chand Bodhle, behind the traditional account of Eknath's guru-lineage was described by Jon Keune as a "novel theory" later substantiated by R. C. Dhere and S. G. Tulpule. His editions of Sheikh Muhammad's poetry have been used and critically examined by Dušan Deák, who placed Bendrey among the major twentieth-century Maharashtrian historians alongside Rajwade, Potdar, Khare, and Sardesai.

Institutional recognition. Bendrey was elected President of Section III at the 1955 session of the Indian History Congress in Calcutta, having served as an assistant secretary at the Congress's inaugural session in Pune in 1935. Under his editorship, approximately 450 periodicals were surveyed as part of a project on the economic and social history of Maharashtra. Beyond Maratha-era history, he also assisted the compilation of History of the Freedom Movement in India, which thanks him for contributing books and manuscripts; a footnote records that he personally secured letters relating to the 1857 Satara sedition case from Bhor and permitted the government history office to use them. His works Sadhan Chikitsa and Gad, Kot, Durg ani Tyanchi Vastu have been included in university history syllabi, including that of Solapur University.

== List of publications ==
Shivshahi period

1. Maloji Raje and Shahaji Maharaj: p. 636,

2. Eldest brother of Shivaji Maharaj – Sambhaji Raje Bhosale: p. 64

3. Maharashtra of the Shivashahi Period: Pp. 36.

4–5. Shrichatrapati Shivaji Maharaj – Eastern and Northern India – Volume 2, p. 1250

6. Rana Jaisingh and Shivaji Maharaj: p. 250

7. Coronation of Shivaji the Great: Pp. 140

8. Srishivarajabhishek (Gagabhat): p. 125

9. Srichatrapati Sambhaji Maharaj: p. 750, first edition

10. Srichatrapati Sambhaji Maharaj: p. 596, 2nd ed.

11. Dandanitiprakaranam (Keshav Pandit): p. 140

12. Rajaramcharitam (Keshav Pandit): p. 120

13. Rajaramcharitam (Keshav Pandit – Original Sanskrit only): p. 32

14. Srichhatrapati Rajaram and 'Leaderless Hindavi Swarajya' fight with Mughals: p. 572

15. Instrumental Medicine (Introductory Volume of the History of Shivshahi): p. 350

16. Research History and Resources of Maharashtra History: p. 84

17. History revision method, author K. P. Pandit, Second Edition, Editor V.S.Bendre.

Other historical:

18. Tarikh-I-Ilahi or Akbar's Divine Era: Pp. 50

19. Adilshahi of Bijapur: Approx. p. 875

20. Qutubshahi of Govalkonda: p. 364

21. A Study of Muslim Inscriptions: Pp. 200

22. Movements of Portuguese in Maharashtra: p. 129

23. Downfall of Angre's Navy: Pp. 43.

Historical texts:

24. Tools of Maharashtra History – Section 1: Published in old periodicals. P. 192

25. Tools of Maharashtra History-Section 2nd: p. 592

26. Tools of Maharashtra History – Section 3rd: p. 614

27. The Factory and Company Records – Report: Pp. 16

28. Alienation Office Records and Poona Daftar: Pp. 80

29. Report on the Peshava Daftar or Guide to the Records:

30. A Study of Literature on Science and Technology of Olden Times: Pp. 24

31. Maharashtra History Council – Essay Collection: First Session: p. 200.

32. Maharashtra History Council – Collection of Essays: Convention II: p. 175

33. Maharashtra History Council – Convention III: p. 350

34. Maharashtra History Council – Convention IV: p. 300.

Saint Tukaram:

35. Saint-narrator of Tukaram Maharaj: p. 250

36, Raghav Chaitanya, Keshav Chaitanya and Babaji or Tukob's Guru Parampara: p. 260,

37. Saint Tukaram – Charitra Kavitva ani Tatvadnyan: p. 250

38. Mantra Gita by Sreesanth Shrestha Tukaram Maharaj: with character and medical prologue, p. 350

39. Mantra Gita by Sreesanth Shrestha Tukaram Maharaj: Second Edition, p. 260

40. Dehudarshan: p. 60

41. Dehudarshan Chitrasangraha: p. 16

Saints:

42. Sheikh Mohammad Baba Shrigondekar's "Yoga Sangram": p. 250

43. Unpublished collection of poems by Sheikh Mohammad Baba Shrigondekar: p. 225

44. Krishnadas Vairagikrit ‘Chatu Shloki Bhagavatavali Nirupane’ 64

45. Navvidhabhakti or Bhaktitattvadarsha-Shivachaitanyakrit: p. 200.

Others

46. Sighradhvanilekhanapaddati – Marathi: p. 100

47. : Quick Voice Writing System – Gujarati: p. 100

48. Stenography for India: Pp. 54

49. Gad Kot Durg: p. 100

50–53. Tukaram Maharaj's comprehensive collection of poems: Part 1 to 4.

54. Sreesanth Shrestha Tukaram Maharaj: (Tukaram Maharaj Character-Part 1), Adamase p. 250.

55. Sreesanth Shrestha Tukaram Maharaj's philosophy and teachings of Paraviya: Adamase p. 250.

56. Tukaram – His Life, Writing and Philosophy: about 300 Pages.

57. Indian History and Culture: Quarterly-17 100 pages each

== Gallery ==
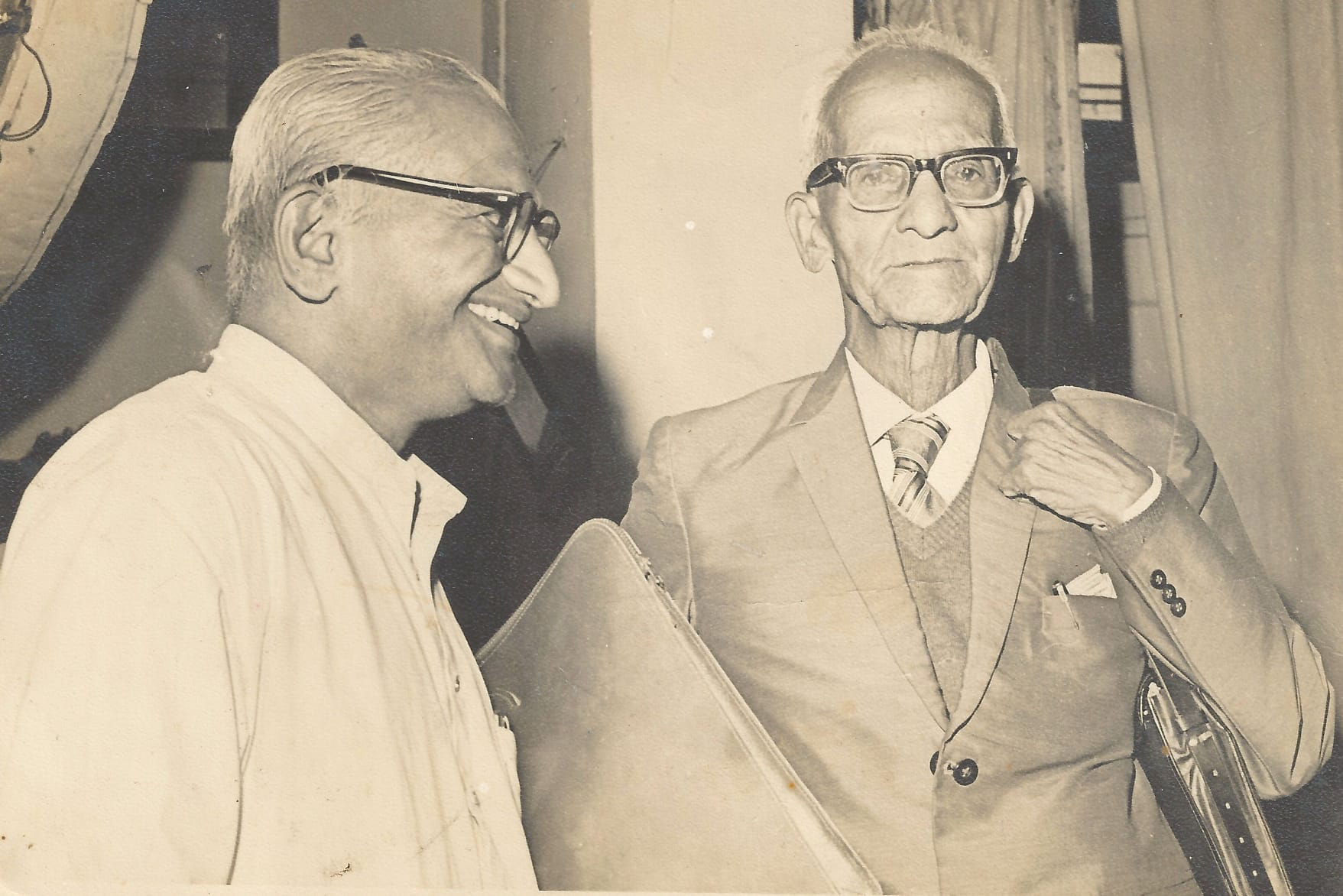
V.S.Bendrey

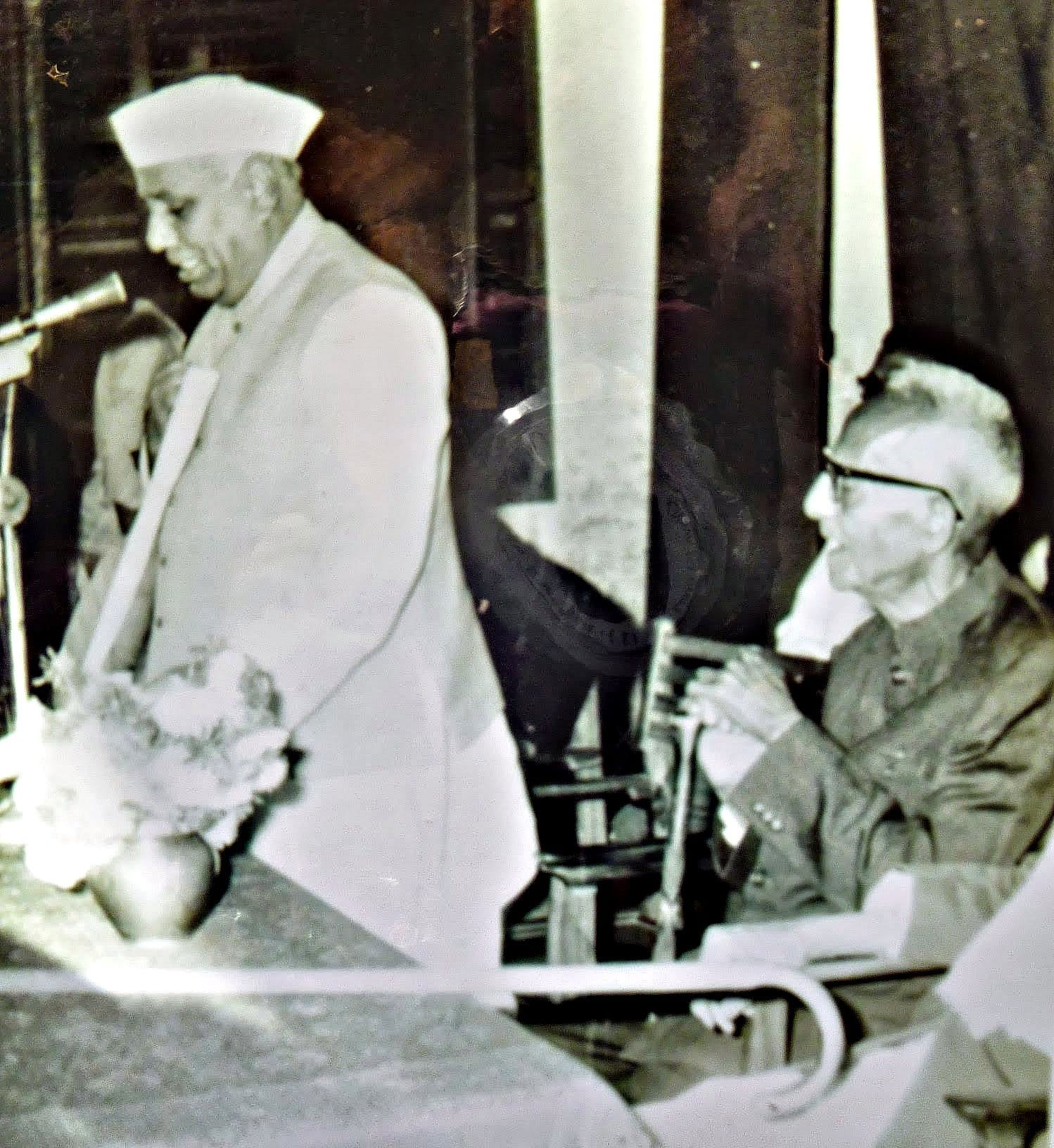
V.S.Bendrey and Maharashtra Chief Minister Late Yashwantrao Chavan

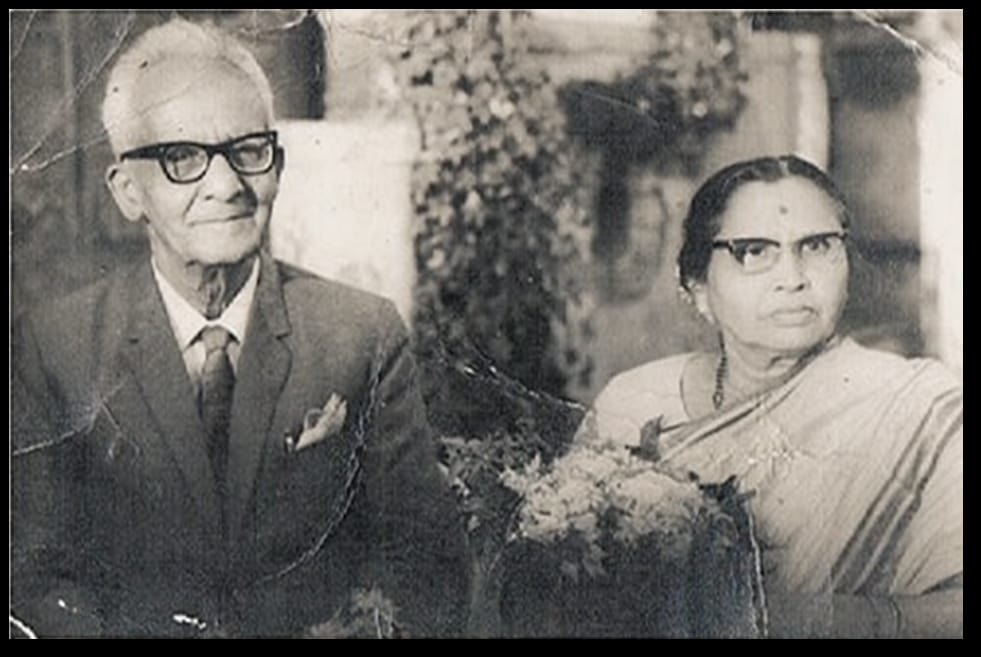
V.S.Bendrey with Family

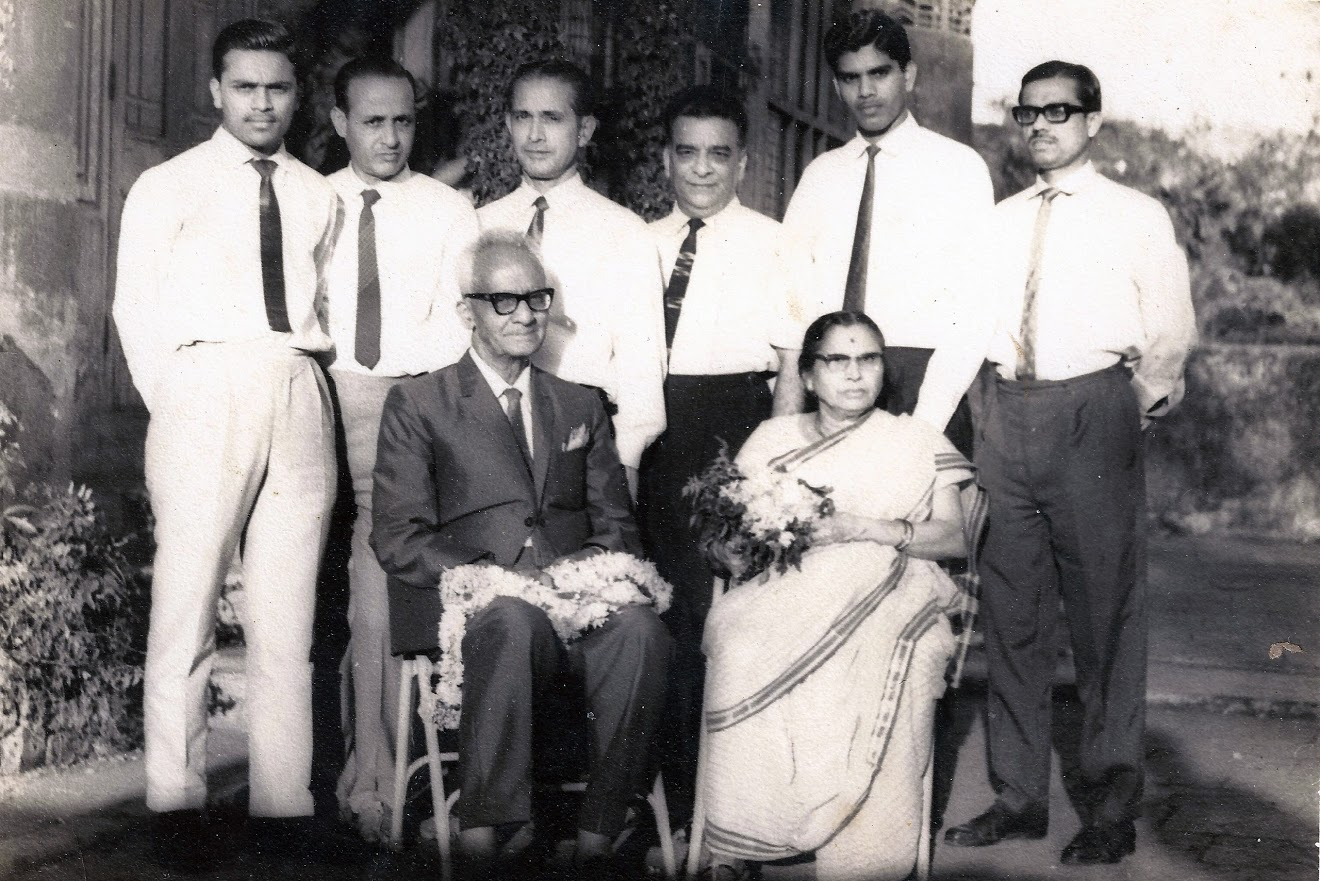
V.S.Bendrey with Family

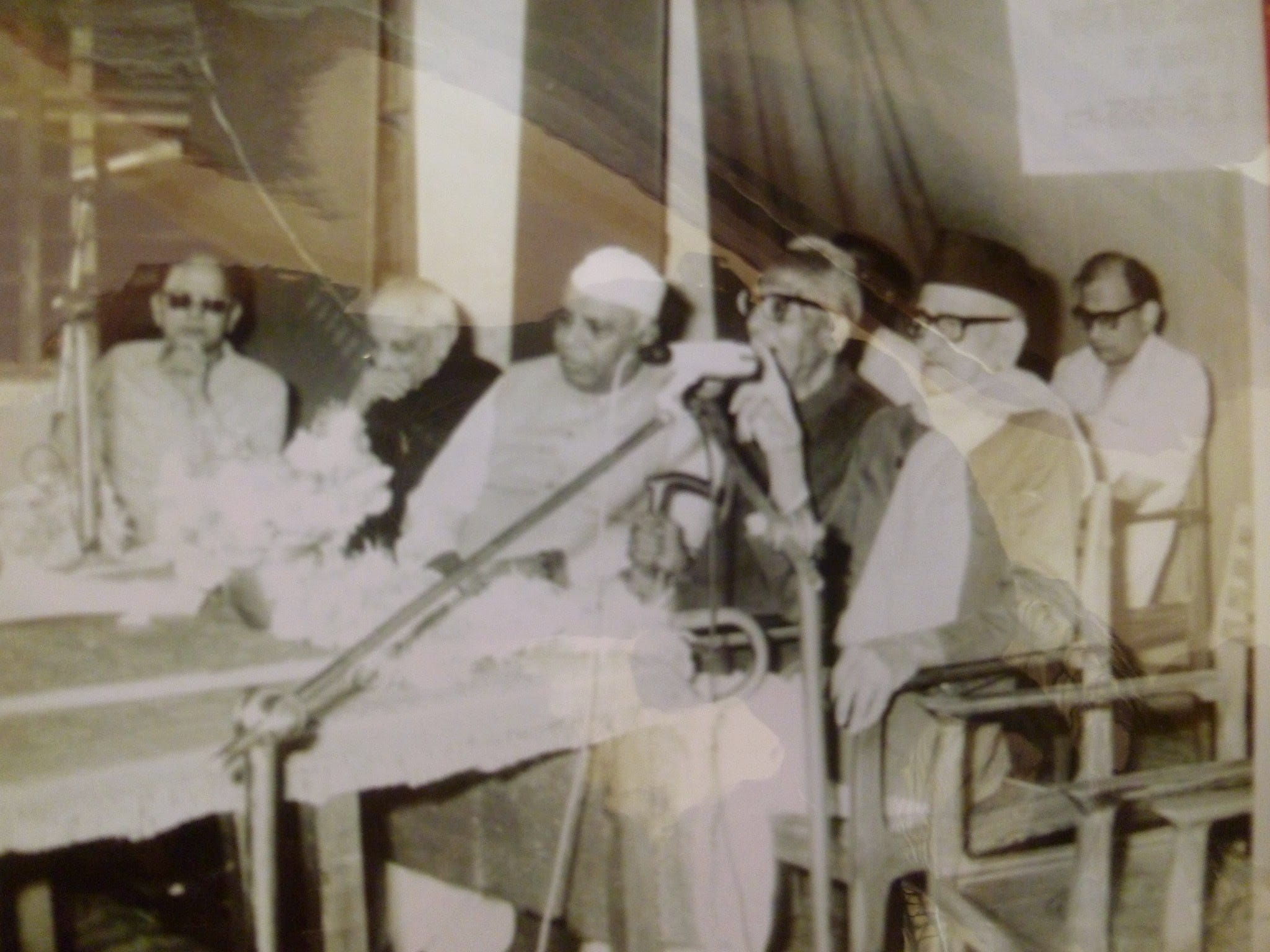
V.S.Bendrey and Maharashtra Chief Minister Late Yashwantrao Chavan

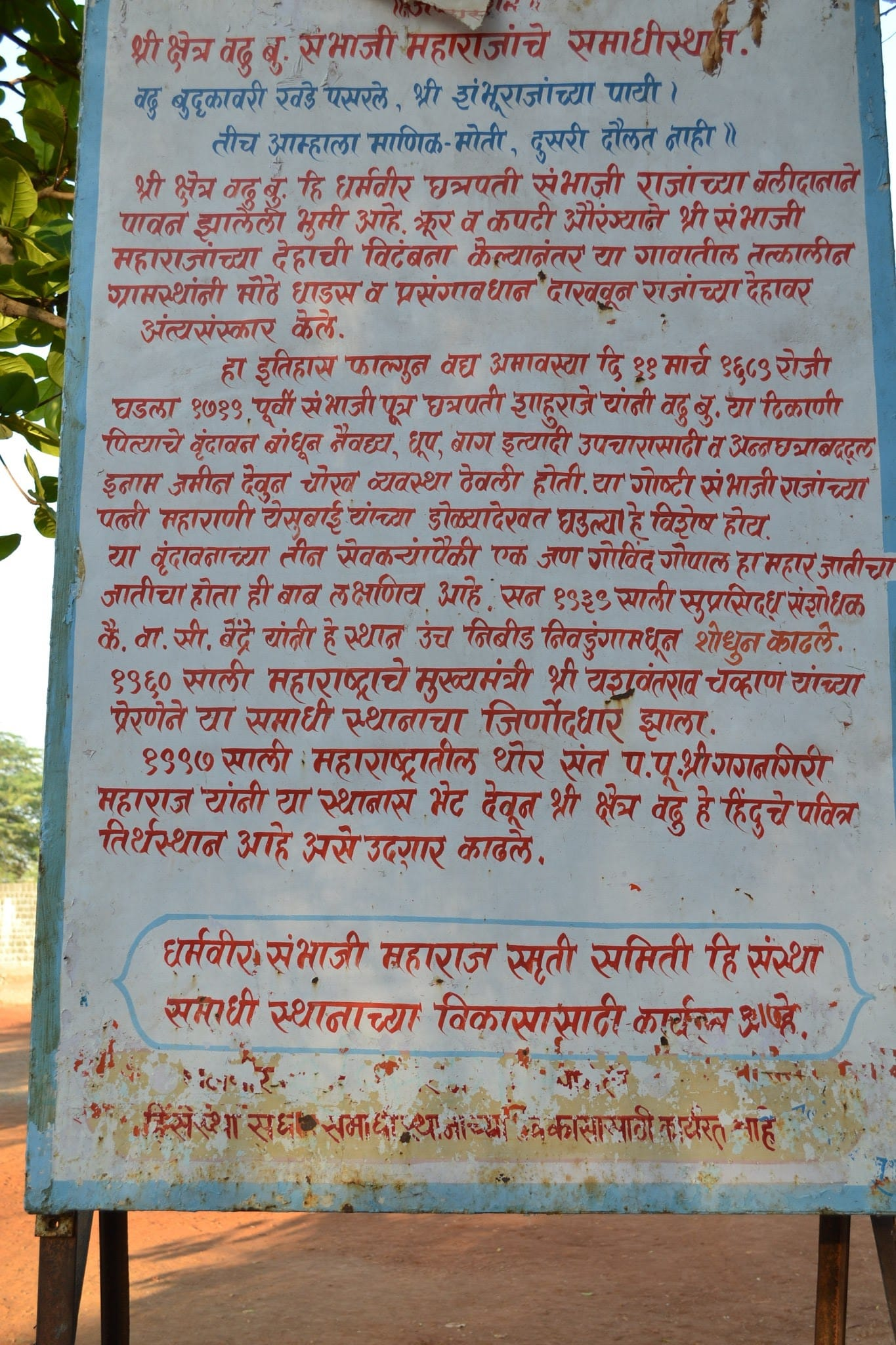
V.S.Bendrey Name in Vadhu-Tulapur

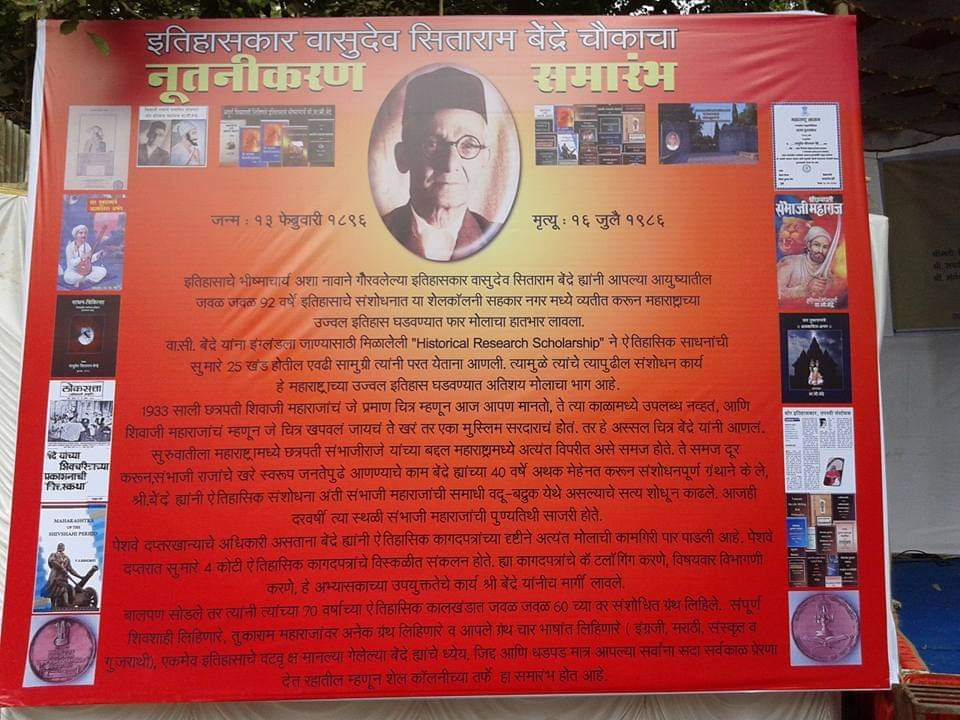
V.S.Bendrey Chowk Information

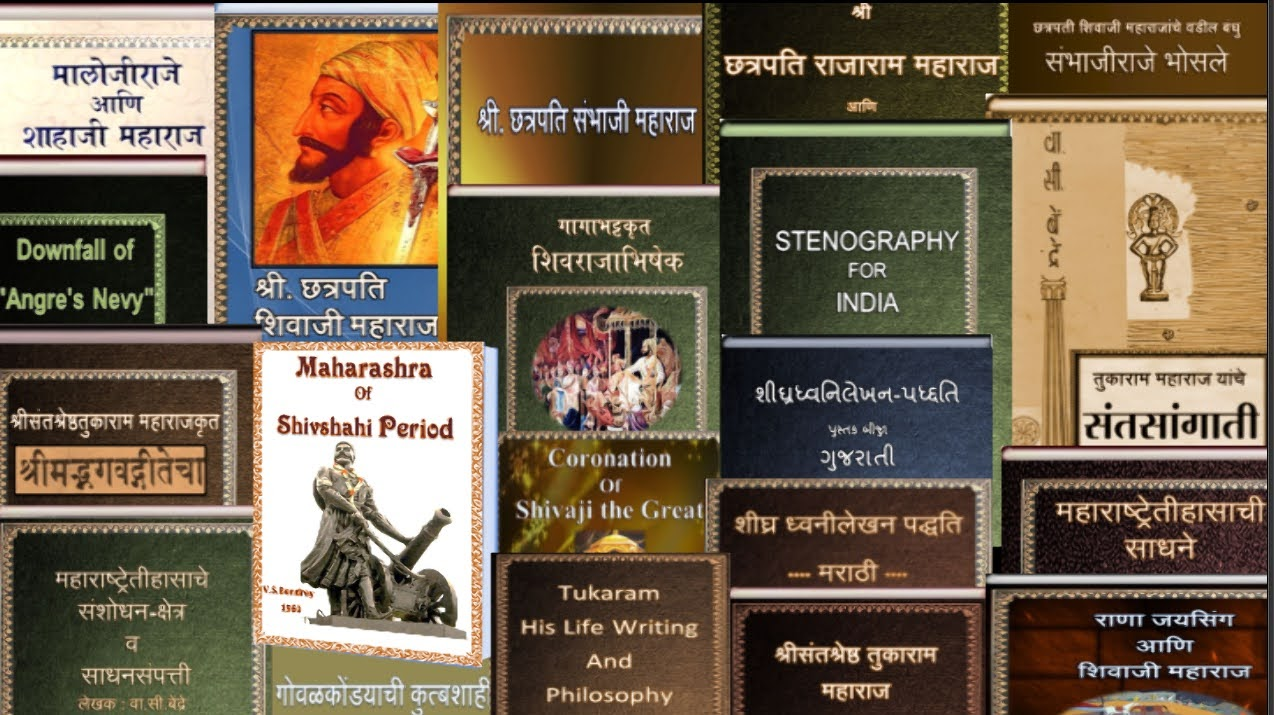
V.S.Bendrey Books

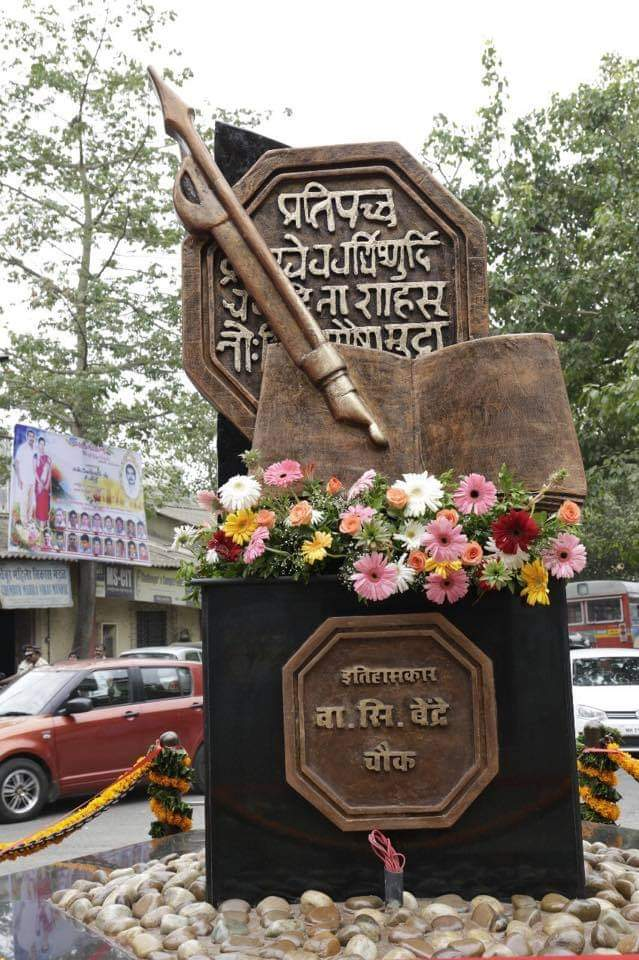
V.S.Bendrey Chowk

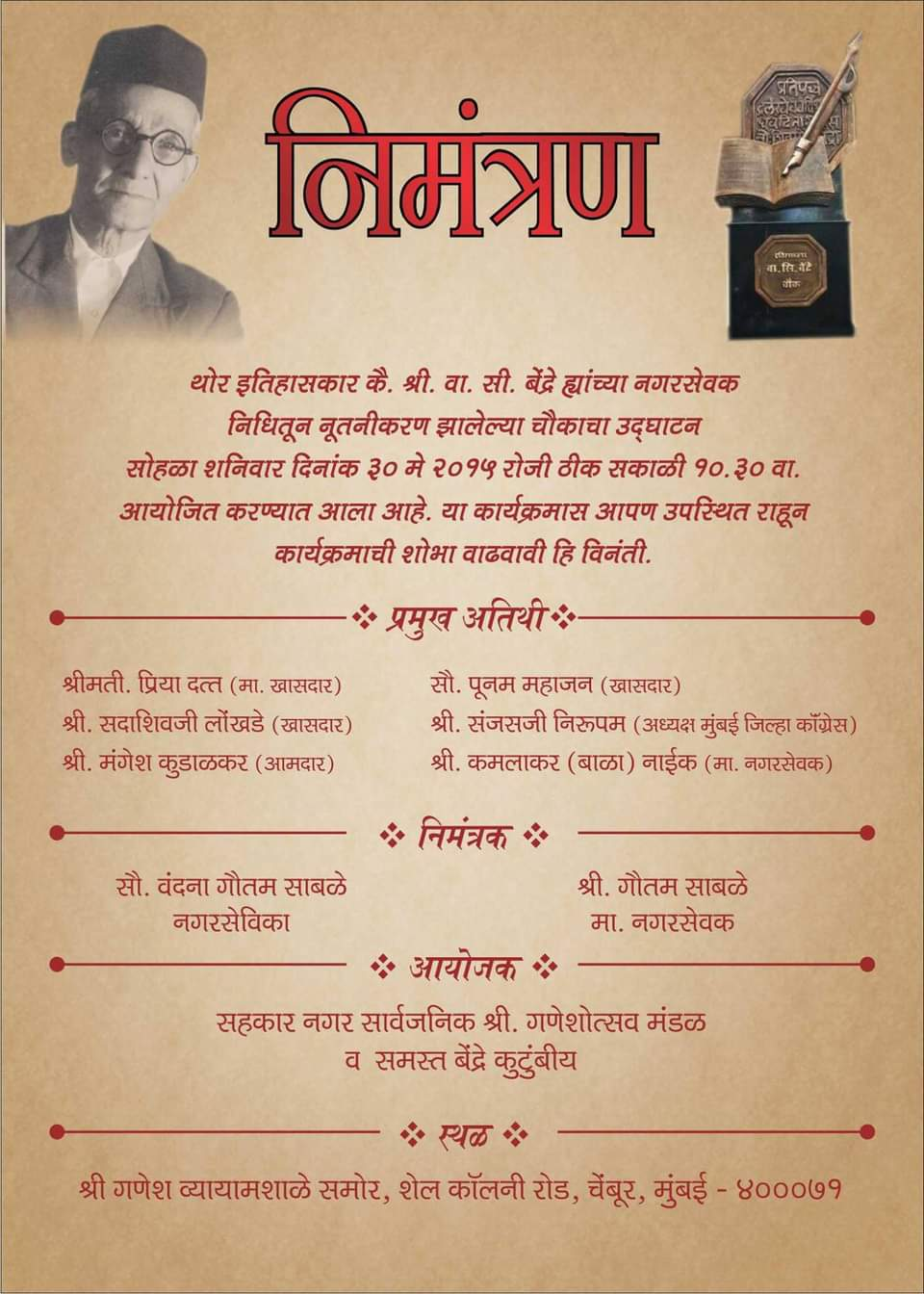
Invitation letter of V.S.Bendrey Chowk

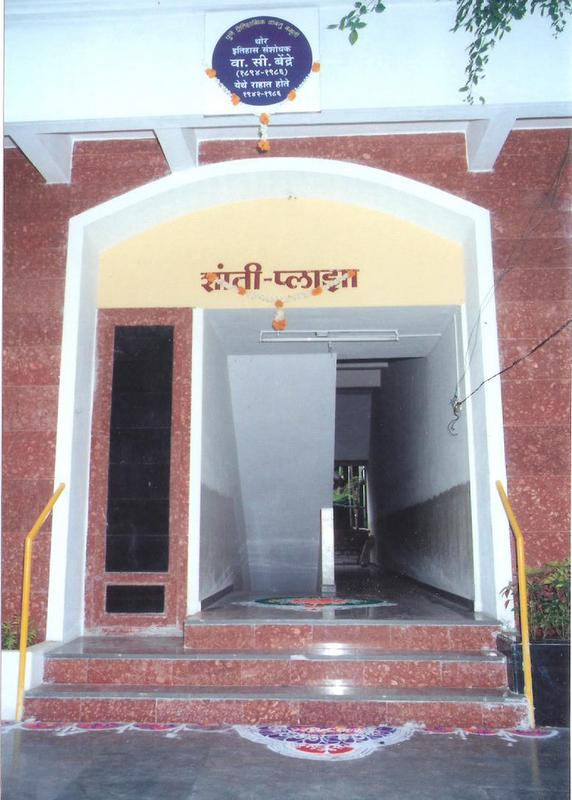
V.S.Bendrey Home Pune
