= Vishwanath Kashinath Rajwade =

Indian historian (1863-1926)

Itihasacharya Vishwanath Kashinath Rajwade
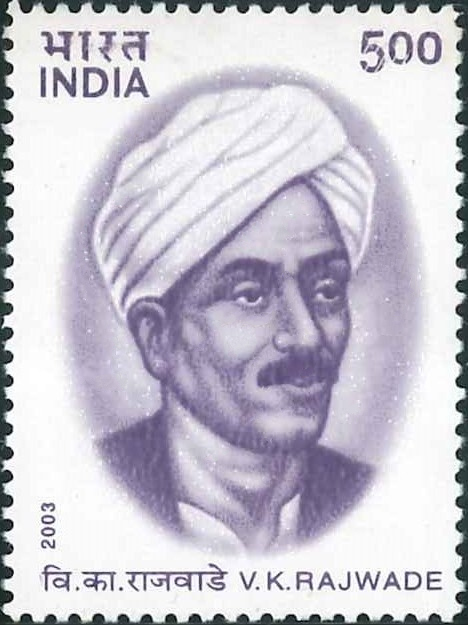
- Rajwade on a 2003 commemorative stamp
- Born: 24 July 1863; Raigad, Bombay Presidency, British India
- Died: 31 December 1926 (aged 63); Dhule, Bombay Presidency, British India
- Occupations: historian, writer, commentator, orator

Academic background
- Education: Deccan College

Academic work
- Notable works: Marathyanchya Itihasachi Sadhane (Sources of the History of Marathas)

Vishwanath Kashinath Rajwade (24 July 1863 – 31 December 1926) was an Indian historian, known for his work on the history of the Maratha Empire. He pioneered research into the Empire by visiting hundreds of villages across India and gathering thousands of historical documents, especially family records. He also founded the Bharat Itihas Sanshodhak Mandal, a research institute, at Pune on 7th July 1910 to facilitate Historical Research.

His students include historians like Datto Vaman Potdar, Vasudeo Sitaram Bendrey and G. H. Khare.

The historian, Ram Sharan Sharma says: "With his unadulterated passion for research, V.K. Rajwade went from village to village in Maharashtra in search of Sanskrit manuscripts and sources of Maratha history; which were published in twenty-two volumes."

The Indian History Congress created the Vishwanath Kashinath Rajwade Award for lifelong service and contribution to Indian history.

== Early life ==
Rajwade was born on 24 July 1863 at Varsai, Raigad district, Bombay Presidency, at a Chitpavan Brahmin family. Rajwade's grandfather was the Killedar of fort Lohagad in the province of Pune. His father died while he was a child and from then he was brought up by his uncle at Vadgaon near Pune. He matriculated in January 1882 and graduated in 1890 from Deccan College, Pune. During his degree course he came into close contact with the eminent historian Ramkrishna Gopal Bhandarkar, who was then a professor at the college. He was also inspired by the works of the Essayist Vishnushastri Krushnashastri Chiplunkar, lexicographer Parshuram Tatya Godbole and Kavyeitihas Sangrahakar Sane.

== Later life ==
Rajwade married after graduating from college but his wife died young. Thereafter he chose to remain single and dedicate his life to history and research. In 1895 he started a Marathi magazine called Bhashantar (meaning ‘translation’) through which he brought works of Western historians and scholars such as Plato, Aristotle, and Edward Gibbon, and also Indian scholars like Shankaracharya to Marathi speaking readers. Simultaneously, by writing articles and delivering speeches he also started educating Marathi people on several subjects like history of the Marathas, history of the world, history of Marathi literature, grammar of Marathi and Sanskrit languages. In 1910, he founded the Bharat Itihas Sanshodhak Mandal at Pune and kept all his works and historical papers gathered by him in the custody of the Mandal.

After his sudden death in 1926, the ‘Rajwade Sanshodhak Mandal’ was founded at Dhule and the works and collection amassed in the later periods of his life were kept there. Both institutions have since been contributing in the field of history and culture of India to this date.

== Works in Marathi ==
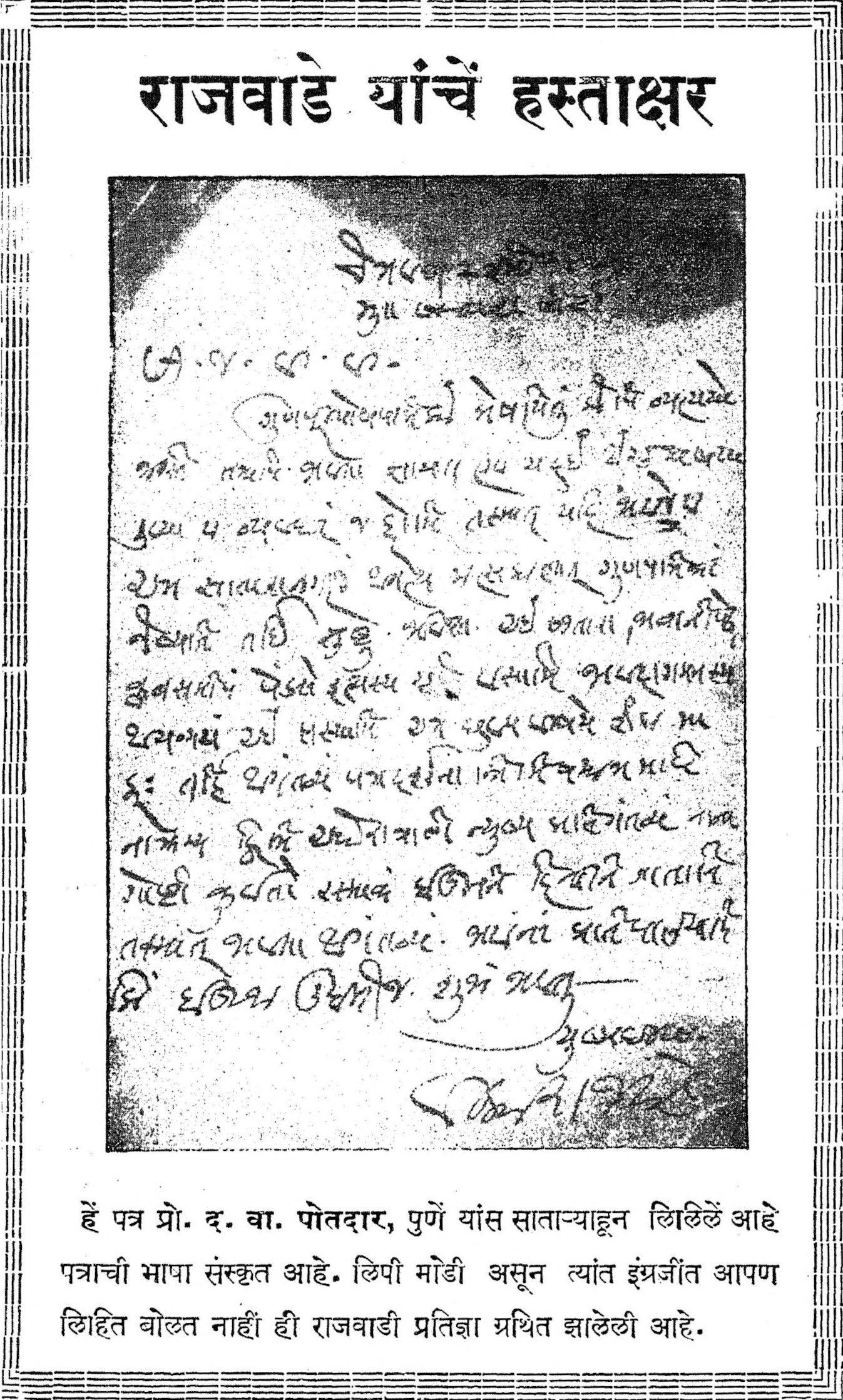
Handwriting of Vishwanath Kashinath Rajwade in the Modi Script

- Marathyanchya Itihasachi Sadhane (Sources of the History of Marathas) – 22 Volumes. He wrote the preface of each of 22 volume very scholarly.
- Radha Madhav Vilas Champu (Biography of Shahaji)
- Aitihasik Prastavana (Historical Prefaces)
- Rajwade Lekhsangraha (Collection of essays) – 3 Volumes
- Bharatiya Vivah Sansthecha Itihas (History of Indian matrimony)
- Dnyaneshwari (Editor)
- Mahikavatichi Bakhar (chronicle of Mahikavati aka Mahim in present-day Mumbai) - detailed analysis & publication.
