= S. M. Garge =

Marathi writer, historian, social worker from Maharashtra, India

Sadashiv Martand Garge
- स. मा. गर्गे
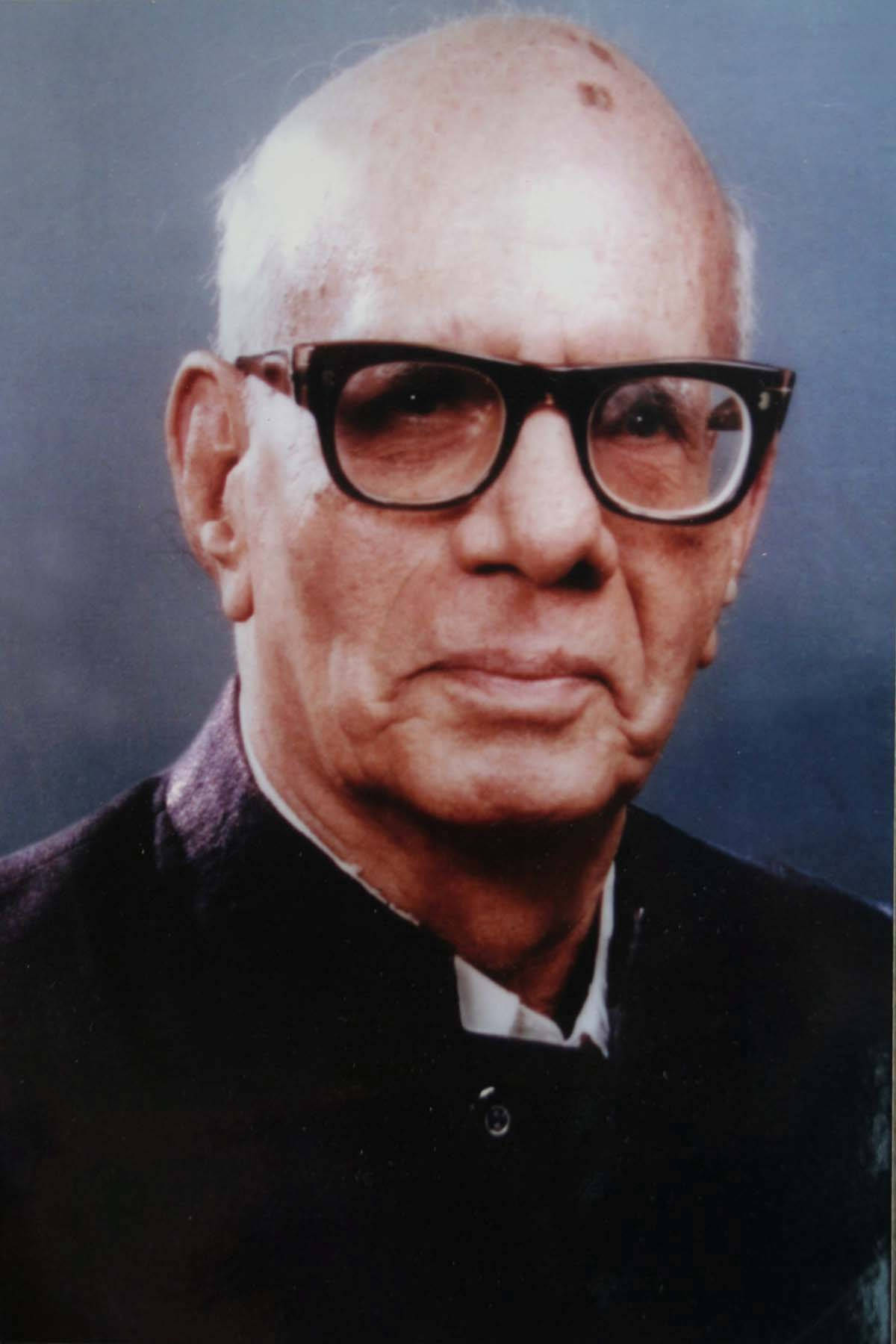
- Born: 4 November 1920; Lahuri, British India
- Died: 4 November 2005 (aged 85); Pune, Maharashtra
- Occupations: Marathi Writer, Editor, Historian, Social Worker.

Sadashiv Martand Garge (4 November 1920 – 4 November 2005) was a Marathi writer, editor, historian, and social worker from Pune, Maharashtra, India. He was popularly known by his initials as स. मा. (Sa. Ma.).

== Biography ==
Garge was born on 4 November 1920 in a small village लहुरी, (Lahuri) Taluka Kej, District Beed in Marathwada region of Maharashtra state. His father’s name was Martand Shankar Garge and mother’s name was Prayag Martand Garge. He was married to Leela (daughter of Mr. Babasaheb Khursale, Ambajogai).

Lahuri, being a very small village, the educational facilities were very limited. He had his high school education in Beed. He then moved to Hyderabad for education in law. During that period, the Marathwada region was under Nizam rule. He was drawn into the freedom movement and hence left the law education. He joined Saraswati Bhuvan High School, Aurangabad as a Teacher in 1940 and served until 1945. In this period, he came in contact with Mr. Gajanan Tryambak Madkholkar (Nagpur), who was a leading Marathi Writer and Editor of a Marathi Daily Newspaper "दैनिक तरूणभारत" ('Dainik Tarun Bharat'). S. M. joined तरूणभारत as Sub-editor and worked from 1945 to 1950. In 1950 he joined "दैनिक सकाळ" ('Daily Sakal' - a Marathi newspaper from Pune) as an Assistant Editor and worked there until 1959. In this period, he started independent writing on subjects viz. Social sciences, Indian History etc. His first book "राज्यशास्त्राचा विकास" ('Rajyashastracha Vikas') was published in 1955.

From 1959 to 1970 he worked in another Marathi newspaper "दैनिक विशाल सह्याद्री" ('Daily Vishal Sahyadri') as News Editor. In 1970 he decided to devote his life in doing research and writing on Social Sciences. Hence he left doing a full-time job. From 1973-75 he worked as Founder Director of the Department of Journalism at Dr. Babasaheb Ambedkar Marathwada University, Aurangabad.

He continued his research and writing original books on Social Sciences. He was also associated with numerous social organizations and worked in various capacities. He founded "समाज विज्ञान मंडळ" (‘Samaj Vidnyan Mandal‘) and worked as Director and Chief Editor of "भारतीय समाज विज्ञान कोश" ('Bharatiya Samaj Vidnyan Kosh' – Encyclopedia of Social Sciences) in 6 volumes. This Encyclopedia was the first of its kind in any Indian language.

He wrote “करवीर रियासत" ('Karveer Riyasat': History of Kolhapur Dynasty - descendants of The Great Shivaji Maharaj.) This was the first history book after the extensive research of this period. The history of Marathas "मराठी रियासत" ('Marathi Riyasat') was written by Late Historian Mr. Govind Sakharam Sardesai in 12 volumes. Mr. Garge edited and published the same.

He had proficiency in Marathi, Urdu, Hindi and English languages.

Garge died on 4 November 2005 (his birthday) after a brief illness at the age of 85. His wife died on 3 June 2009. He is survived by a son and three daughters.

The Sa Ma Garge Awards for journalism are named in his memory.

== Literary accomplishments ==
Garge was a prolific writer and had written numerous original works as well as edited a number of books.

- Books:

The following is a partial list of books authored by Mr. Garge

No.	Book Title	Year
1.	राज्यशास्त्राचा विकास (Rajyashastracha Vikas)	1955
2.	सुलभ राज्यशास्त्र (Sulabh Rajyashastra)	1956
3.	राज्यशासन (Rajyashasan)	
4.	सुलभ अर्थशास्त्र (Sulabh Arthashastra)	
5.	शांतीपर्वातील कथा (Shantiparvatil Katha)	1963
6.	स्वप्न आणि सत्य (Swapna ani Satya)	1964
7.	सेनापती घोरपडे (Senapati Ghorpade)	1974
8.	हिंदुराव घोरपडे (Hindurao Ghorpade)	1983
9.	भारतीय राज्यघटनेचा इतिहास (Bharatiya Rajyaghatnecha Itihaas)	
10.	गोपाळ गणेश अगरकर (Gopal Ganesh Agarkar)	
11.	समाज, विज्ञान आणि संस्कृती (Samaj, Vidnyan ani Sanskruti)	
12.	पत्रकार आणि पत्रकारिता (Patrakar ani Patrakarita)	
13.	इतिहासाची साधने - एक शोधयात्रा (Itihaasachi Sadhane)	

- Editorial Work:

1. मुख्य संपादक - भारतीय समाज विज्ञान कोश

2. मुख्य संपादक - मराठी रियासत

3. संपादक - संघर्ष

4. संपादक - करवीर रियासतीची कागदपत्रे

5. संपादक - शिंदेशाही इतिहासाची साधने

6. संपादक - मराठवाड्याचा विकास: दिशा आणि गति

== Social activities ==
1. Secretary - Maharashtra Working Journalists Association (1960).

2. President - Pune Patrakaar Sangh (1961).

3. Founder Member and Working President - Marathwada Mitra Mandal, Pune (1966–1993).

4. Member - Governing Council: Tilak Maharashtra Vidyapeeth, Pune.

5. Member - Governing Council: Bharat Itihas Sanshodhak Mandal, Pune.

6. Secretary - Bharat Itihas Sanshodhak Mandal, Pune.

7. Trusty and Vice President - Vrutta Vidya Probodhini: Press Institute (1987).

== Awards and Recognitions ==
1. Attended World Journalists Conference held at Vienna (Austria) as a representative of Government of India in 1960.

2. Maharashtra State awards for his books राज्यशास्त्राचा विकास (Rajyashaastracha Vikas), स्वप्न आणि सत्य (Swapna ani Satya), करवीर रियासत (Karveer Riyasat) and हिंदुराव घोरपडे (Hindurao Ghorpade).

3. Member - Maharashtra Rajya Sahitya Sanskruti Mandal.

4. President - Akhil Maharashtra Itihas Parishad held at Dhule in 1992.

5. President - Akhil Maharashtra Itihas Parishad held at Kolhapur in 1994.

6. President - Marathwada Sahitya Sammelan, held at Shirur Tajband in 1997.

7. Mira Keval Vishwastha Sanstha, 'Pradnyawant' Puraskaar in 1998.

8. Maharashtra Sahitya Parishad Shreshthata Puraskaar for book इतिहासाची साधने - एक शोधयात्रा (Itihasachi Sadhane - Ek shodh yatra).
