= Ganesh Vyankatesh Joshi =

Indian economist

Rao Bahadur Ganesh Vyankatesh Joshi
- Born: 9 June 1851; Miraj, Bombay Presidency, British India
- Died: 20 May 1911 (aged 59); Poona, India
- Education: Elphinstone College
- Occupations: Economist, academic
- Honours: Rao Bahadur (1898)

Ganesh Vyankatesh Joshi (9 June 1851 – 20 May 1911) was an Indian economist from the state of Maharashtra. He served as the President of Bharat Itihas Sanshodhak Mandal.

== Early life of G.V Joshi ==
Ganesh Vyankatesh Joshi was born at Miraj on 9 June 1851. The family is known as the Utturkar family in that province, as it held hereditary lands in the village of Uttur in the Inchalkaranji State. Joshi's ancestors came up from Varoda in the Ratnagiri District, and settled at Uttur towards the close of the 18th Century. The Patwardhan Sirdars then ruling over that part of the country conferred a grant of lands on the Joshi family in order that it should settle at Uttur and look to the religious wants of the village as Vaidic Brahmins. Joshi's grandfather Ballal Raghunath was in the Military Service of the Patwardhan Sirdars. In 1818 Ballal Raghunath was sent by the Patwardhan Sirdars to Poona to render military aid to Bajirao, the last Peshwa; and in the conflict which subsequently ensued between the Peishwas and the British, he took no small part. From Ballal Raghunath's time, time the Joshi family settled at Miraj. Mr. Joshi's father was the Treasury Officer of the Miraj State, and during his career was known for the straightforwardness of character.

== Education ==
Joshi commenced his education in the vernacular School at Tasgaon. After learning the Marathi alphabet under the Tatya Pantoji of Tasgaon, Joshi was sent to Kolhapur to complete his Marathi fourth standard. From Kolhapur, he came to Miraj and joined the English School there. Studying at Miraj for some years, he joined the Poona High School in the candidate class, then under Mr. Jacob as the Head Master. He passed the Matriculation with Marathi as his second language when Krishna Shastri Chiplunkar (father of the Late Mr. Vishnu Shastri) and Mr. Candy were the examiners for Marathi. Joshi thereafter joined the Elphinstone College at Mumbai in 1870. He began to learn Sanskrit only after joining the college, and within one year made up the subject to the required standard and got through the Examination. He passed the B.A. in 1873, with Logic and Moral Philosophy, and History and Political Economy as his optional subjects. He was known for proficiency in his studies and throughout his collegiate career held various scholarships. Learning under Professor Wordsworth, he imbibed the qualities of thoroughness and perseverance which marked him throughout his future life. In the B.A. he stood first in Logic; the examiner was so satisfied with his answers that he thought he should give Joshi full marks, but lest he should transgress the leading fashion of his colleagues, he deducted a few marks on the ground of bad hand-writing. After his graduation, Joshi studied for his M.A., but as he had not taken the B.A.degree, he was not allowed to appear for the Examination.

Thereafter Joshi joined the Ahmednagar High School as a teacher on a salary of 100 Rs. After four months owing to misunderstanding between himself and headmaster and also domestic complications, he had to resign his post at Ahmednagar. Joshi thought of settling at Miraj after his father's death a few days later. But owing to family not to wait long. He joined again the Educational Department as a teacher in the High School at Nasik. He subsequently served at Ratnagiri, and Mumbai, and was appointed Vice-Principal of the Training College at Poona. From Poona he was posted to Solapur as headmaster of the high school in 1890. He worked at Solapur for eight years. In 1897, the plague broke out at Solapur in all its virulence and Government opened out its operation in vigour. Joshi voluntarily took up plague work as a Ward-Inspector under a European Plague Officer. A tussle ensued between the Officer and Mr. Joshi, who was always self-respectful and straight in his dealings . Mr. Joshi stuck to his guns and reported the incident to the higher quarters, with the result that the European Officer had to apologise for his overbearing conduct. Thereupon, Joshi was appointed Superintendent of the Potepur Plague Camp.

In 1898, the Bombay government conferred on him the title of Rao Bahadur, and also issued an appreciatory Press Note, in recognition of the valuable services rendered by him during the plague epidemic at Solapur. From Solapur, Joshi was posted to Nasik, from thence to Satara, and in 1904 was appointed Head-Master of the Poona High School. After eighteen month's services at Poona, he was again posted to Satara. After serving at Satara for a few months, Mr. Joshi retired by the end of March 1907, after having put up thirty years' service in the Educational Department. After retirement, he lived at Poona till his death on 20 May 1911.

== Sources ==
- Writings and Speeches of Hon.Rao Bahadur G.V.Joshi.
