= Mangala Godbole =

Marathi writer

Mangala Godbole (b. 1949) is a Marathi writer from Pune, Maharashtra, India. She has been writing for over 35 years. She wrote her first article soon after her marriage and sent it to Stree—the only feminist magazine in Marathi those days—which published it immediately. She continued to write extensively on women’s issues for the magazine and ultimately joined its editorial team in the 1980s. It was here that she accidentally ventured into writing a humour column, which she continued for 10 years. Today, Godbole is the only woman humorist of eminence in the Marathi literary world.

== Literary work ==
Godbole's works have received eight Maharashtra state's literary awards and 13 other prestigious awards. She has written thus far 60 books. The following is a list of the titles of some of her books:

=== Collections of short stories and essays ===
- अशी घरं अशी माणसं
- कुंपण आणि आकाश
- सहवास हा सुखाचा
- गाठ आहे लग्नाशी
- जिथली वस्तू तिथे
- पर्स हरवलेली बाई
- पुरुषोत्तमाय नम:
- अळवावरचे थेंब
- खुणेची जागा
- ... आणि मी
- पुन्हा झुळूक
- नवी झुळूक
- पोटाचा प्रश्न
- ब्रह्मवाक्य
- गुंडावळी
- भलं बुरं
- कोपरा
- झुळूक
- सोबत
- आरंभ
- मध्य

=== Novel ===
- गोंदण (कादंबरी)

=== Children's literature ===
- नीरू आणि नेहा (बालसाहित्य)

=== Informational literature ===
- वयात येताना
- दत्तक घेण्यापूर्वी
- काय तुझ्या मनात

=== Critique ===
- अमृतसिद्धी (समीक्षा; २ खंड) (सहलेखक : S. H. Deshpande)
