= Datto Vaman Potdar =

Indian historian and writer (1890–1979)

Mahamahopadhyaya Datto Vaman Potdar
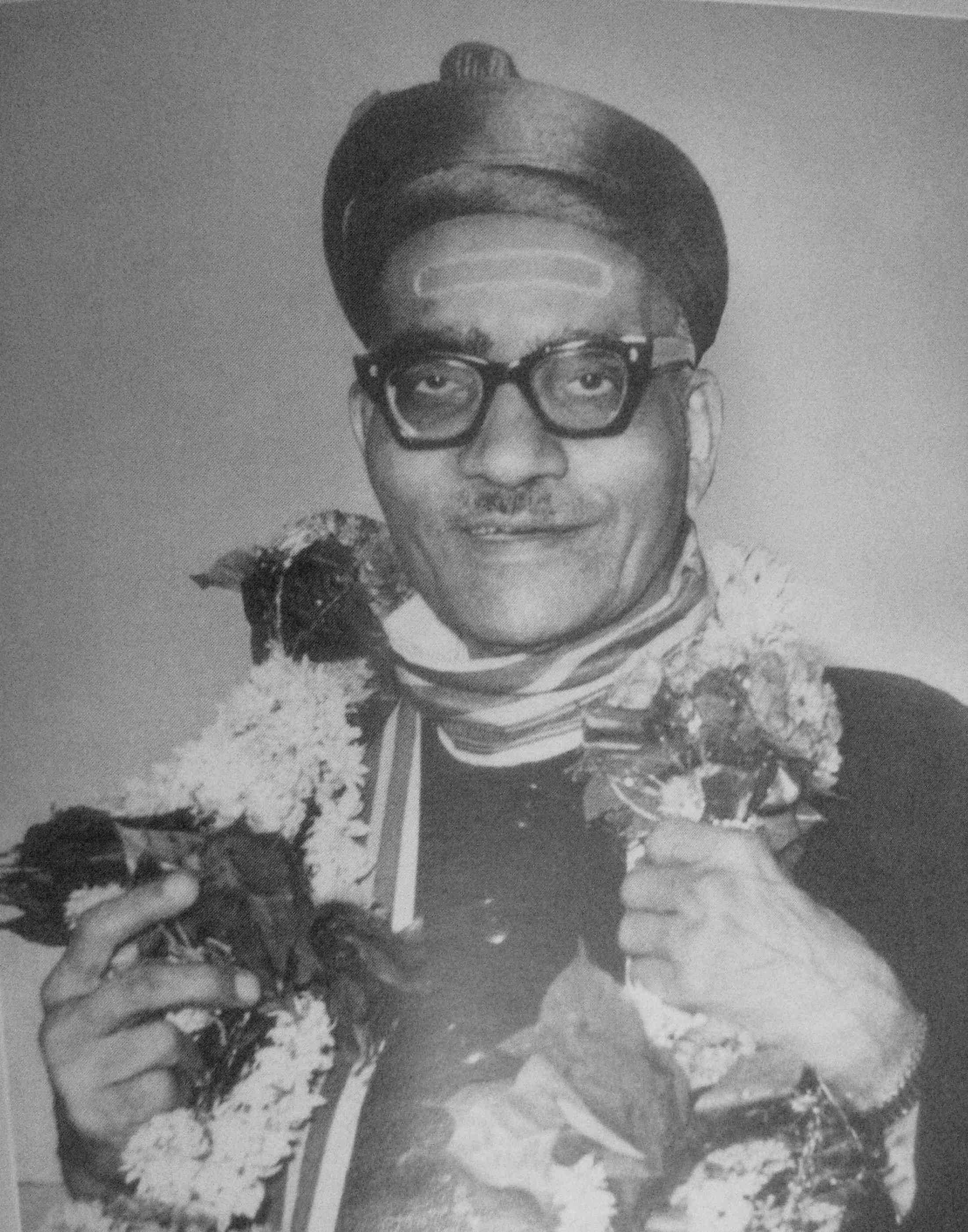

Vice Chancellor, University of Pune
- In office 1 July 1961 – 30 June 1964
- Preceded by: Dattatreya Gopal Karve
- Succeeded by: Narhar Vishnu Gadgil

Personal details
- Born: Dattatray Vaman Potdar; 5 August 1890 Birwadi, Raigad District, Bombay Presidency (now part of Maharashtra, India), British Raj
- Died: 6 October 1979 (aged 89) Pune, Maharashtra, India
- Education: Fergusson College
- Awards: Padma Bhushan (1967)

Dattatray Vaman Potdar (5 August 1890 – 6 October 1979), better known as Datto Vaman Potdar, was an Indian historian, writer, and orator. He was the Vice-Chancellor of University of Pune from 1961 to 1964.

The British colonial Government of India had honored Potdar with the title Mahamahopadhyaya in 1946. He was honored by government of india with Padmabhushan in 1967. Because of his vast knowledge, he was sometimes called as Dr. Johnson of Maharashtra or a living encyclopedia.

Potdar was a disciple of the historian Vishwanath Kashinath Rajwade, and served as a trustee of Pune based Itihas Sanshodhak Mandal (इतिहास संशोधक मंडळ) founded by Rajwade. His disciples included Pandurang Sadashiv Sane, Swami Swaroopanand, Vasudeo Sitaram Bendrey, Sethu Madhav Rao Pagadi, and Ramchandra Chintaman Dhere.

== Early life ==
Potdar was born into Karhade Brahmin family in the village of Birwadi in Raigad District of Maharashtra. Potdar completed his matriculation in 1906 from Nutan Marathi Vidyalaya in Pune, and four years later received a bachelor's degree in History and Marathi from the then University of Bombay affiliated Ferguson college in Pune.

== Career ==
Potdar became a teacher in 1912 at Shikshan Prasarak Mandali's Nutan Marathi Vidyalaya, his former school. He left the school in 1920 as the Head Master of the school. Shikshan Prasarak Mandali appointed him as a professor in 1921 at New Poona College (later renamed S. P. College) in Pune. He remained in that position until 1935.

Potdar had mastered Sanskrit to the extent that he could fluently converse in it. He also was proficient in Persian and this proved to be valuable while conducting Historical Research.

== Scholarly career ==
In 1910, Sardar Mehendale, V. K. Rajwade, and Potdar founded Itihas Sanshodhak Mandal. Potdar maintained passionate interest through his life in the growth of the Mandal. He traveled all over India, collecting historical documents pertaining especially to Maratha Empire and Marathi literature. He ran periodicals, delivered speeches, and organized lecture series, inspiring others to research historical papers. He only once went abroad and that was to what in those times was USSR. In 1965, the Government of Maharashtra appointed Potdar to write the biography of Shivaji, but before he could finish the assignment, he died on 6 October 1979 in Pune.

== Personal ==
Potdar remained a lifelong bachelor.He was a victim of the 1961 Panshet floods with the wada he lived in the Narayan Peth neighbourhood near the banks of the Mutha River getting destroyed by the flood waters.

== Works ==
- Vasantik Upadesh in IX parts (Marathi) – 1917 to 1929
- Apale Pune (Marathi) – 1921
- Marathi Gadyacha Ingraji Avtar (Marathi) – 1922
- Thorle Madhavrao (Marathi) – 1928
- Bodhprad Pustika for students in XII parts (Marathi) – 1935
- Marathi Itihas va Itihas Sanshodhan (Marathi) – 1935
- Maharashtra Sahitya Parishadecha Itihas (Marathi) – 1943
- Jaypur Darshan (Marathi) – 1948
- Suman Saptak (Marathi) – 1950
- Maharashtra Deshachya Itihasache Sankshipt Varnan (Marathi) – 1951
- Samaj Shikshan Mala (Marathi) – 1952
- Shrote Ho ! (Marathi) – 1959
- Bharatachi Bhashan Samasya (Marathi) – 1960
- Me Europat kay pahile ? (Marathi) – 1960
- Olakh (Marathi) – 1961
- Inside Maharashtra (English) – 1964
- Lokmanya Tilakanche Sangati (Marathi) – 1975

Besides the above, Potdar has to his credit over 600 historical articles (Marathi and English).

== Editorial works ==
- Devdas krut Sant Malika – 1913
- Marathe Va Ingraj – 1922
- Dr. Johnson Yanche Charitra – 1924
- Sahitya Sopan – 1931
- N.M.V.Smarak Grantha – 1933
- Shivdin Kesari Krut Dnyan Pradeep – 1934
- Vaktrutva : Krushnashastri Chiplunkar – 1936
- Maza Pravas – Vishnubhat Godse – 1966
- English East India Company cha Peshwe Darbarshi farsi patravyavahar
- Vad yanchya Athwani : Parvatibai Paranjpe – 1971

== Affiliations ==
Potdar was closely associated with 68 organizations. including the following:

- Bharat Itihas Sanshodhak Mandal, Pune
- Nutan Marathi Vidyalaya
- University of Pune
- University of Bombay
- Deccan Gymkhana
- Pune Marathi Granthalaya
- Shikshan Prasarak Mandali
- Pune Corporation
- Bhandarkar Institute
- Maharashtra Sahitya Parishad
- Tilak Maharashtra Vidyapith
- Shri Chhatrapati Sambhaji Smarak Mandal
- Narvir Tanaji Smarak Mandal
- Samyukta Maharashtra Parishad
- Peshwe Daftar Committee
- Vaktrutvottejak Sabha
- Ved Shastrottejak Sabha
- S.N.D.T.College
- Maharashtriya Kalopasak, Pune

== Honors ==
- 1939 – President of Akhil Bharatiya Marathi Sahitya Sammelan held at Ahmednagar
- 1945 – President of Maharashtra Rashtra Bhasha Parishad
- 1945 – Vice Chancellor of Tilak Maharashtra Vidyapith
- 1946 – ‘Mahamahopadhyaya’ title by Government of India
- 1956 – Deputy of Bombay Government at Florence, Italy.
- 1960-1962 – First President of Akhil Bharatiya Marathi Sahitya Mahamandal
- 1961 to 1964 – Vice Chancellor of the University of Pune
- 1962 – Honored as ‘Sanskrut Prachyavidya Pandit’ by Government of India
- 1963 – Leader of the committee of Indian Vice Chancellors for visit to Russia
- 1965 – Honored as ‘Vidya Vachaspati’ in the All India Hindi Meet at Prayag
- 1967 – Received ‘Padma Bhushan’ from the President of India
- 1967 – ‘Doctor of Literature’ from Kashi Vidyapith

== See also ==
- Shikshana Prasarak Mandali
- List of Marathi people
- Indian Rebellion of 1857
