= Manohar Godbole =

Indian cricketer

Manohar Godbole (born in Pune) was an Indian cricketer. He was a right-handed batsman and left-arm slow bowler who played for Maharashtra.

Godbole made a single first-class appearance for the side, during the 1947–48 season, against Nawanagar. From the tailend, he scored 10 runs in the first innings in which he batted, and a duck in the second.

He bowled 32.4 overs in the match, taking 6 wickets and conceding 48 runs.
