= Parshuram Ballal Godbole =

Marathi lexicographer (1799–1874)

- Born: 1799; Mai, Maratha Empire
- Died: 3 September 1874 (aged 74–75)
- Known for: Marathi Lexicography

Parshuram Ballal Godbole (1799 – 3 September 1874) was a Marathi lexicographer, editor, and translator.

He was one of the editors of Panditi Kosha, a dictionary prepared by Sanskrit scholars. He was also the editor of Navneet, a collection of Marathi poems.

He was the Personal Pandit for Thomas Candy.
