= Bharat Itihas Sanshodhak Mandal =

Indian institution

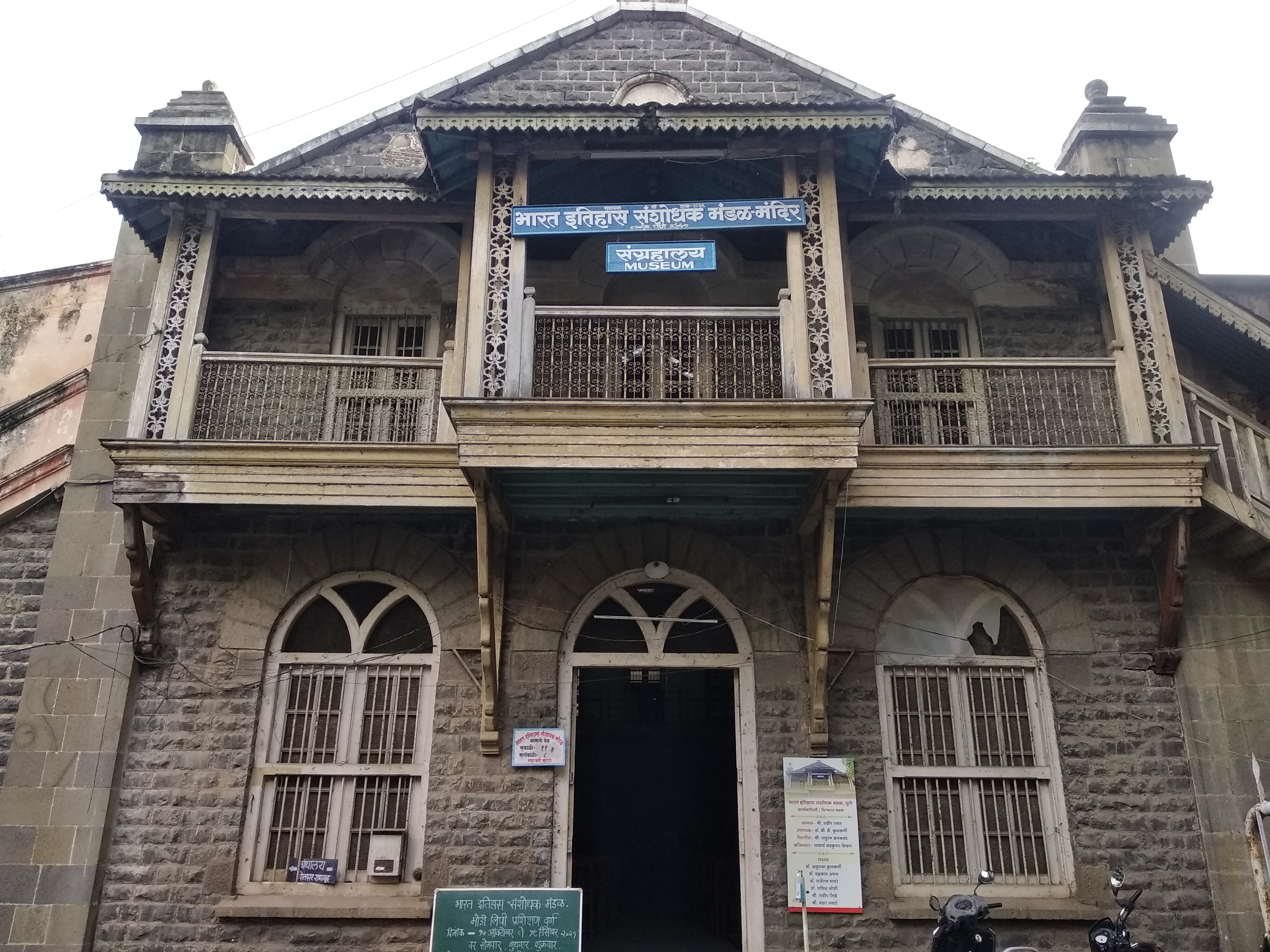
- Bharat Itihas Sanshodhak Mandal, Pune
- Interactive map of the Bharat Itihas Sanshodhak Mandal area

General information
- Location: Maharashtra, India
- Coordinates: 18.5109782364365°N 73.8499802953962°E

Bharat Itihas Sanshodhak Mandal, popularly known as Itihas Sanshodhak Mandal or just 'Mandal', is an Indian institute providing resources and training for historical researchers. It is located at Pune in Maharashtra state. The institute was founded in 1910 by the veteran Indian historian V. K. Rajwade and Sardar K. C. Mehendale. V. K. Rajwade founded Bharat Itihas Sanshodhak Mandal in Pune, on 7 July 1910 to facilitate historical research.

== Objective ==
The main objective behind setting up the Mandal was to provide ready resources to the historians and researchers, to save their time and to motivate them. Rajwade conceived this idea long back but could not fulfill it until Sardar Mehendale met him and on his own expressed his readiness to support him for anything that he wished to do for the betterment of history.

== History ==
The Mandal was founded on 7 July 1910 by the veteran Indian historian Vishwanath Kashinath Rajwade and Sardar Khanderao Chintaman Mehendale at Sardar Mehendale's palace at Appa Balwant Chowk in Pune. To commence activities Rajwade read an essay in the presence of the only listener Sardar Mehendale. Later on, the Mandal moved to its present building located in the Sadashiv Peth area in the heart of the city. In March 1926 the short tempered Rajwade left Pune due to differences with the then Administrators of the Mandal and shifted to Dhule to form another institute which was named after him: the 'Rajwade Sanshodhan Mandir'. The Mandal at Pune, however, continued following its mission to help researchers and contribute to the progress of historical study. It has since then been highly supported by the common people and scholars by way of donations and bequests of books and papers. Rajwade's disciples Datto Vaman Potdar, Ganesh Hari Khare and Vasudeo Sitaram Bendrey are believed to have played major roles in making prominent the Mandal and its activities.

== Resources ==
Founder of the Mandal: V.K.Rajwade

Presently, the Mandal maintains more than 1,500,000 historical papers and 30,000 scripts mainly in Marathi, Modi, Persian, Portuguese and English. Moreover, it has also preserved over 4,000 coins, 1,000 paintings and a few sculptures and inscriptions at its well equipped museum. The Mandal's library hosts more than 27,000 books written mainly in Marathi and English, which can be made available to researchers for free consultation or, for a nominal fee, on 'Take Home' basis. These resources include sizeable volumes on the history of the Maratha Empire, Maratha culture and Marathi literature. They also contain a large collection of the material on British Rule as well as Mughal Rule over India. The Mandal issues a Quarterly Journal called 'Trai-Masik' wherein essays and articles on new discoveries are presented. It has also published books written and edited by veteran historians and reports of annual conferences and historians' meets. The Mandal periodically organises lectures, workshops, training, seminars and study tours for the young researchers and historians.

== Funding ==
It was reported in 2004 that the Mandal was insufficiently funded and hus couldn't micro-film or digitise its collection. In 2009, as it entered its 100th year, it planned to create a permanent fund of Ten Million Rupees and use the interest from this fund to pay its expenses.

== Past presidents ==
- 1910 – 1913: Ganesh Vyankatesh Joshi
- 1913 – 1926: Kashinath Narayan Sane
- 1926 – 1935: Chintaman Vinayak Vaidya
- 1935 – 1942: Narsinha Chintaman Kelkar
- 1942 – 1950: Malojirao Naik Nimbalkar
- 1950 – 1974: Datto Vaman Potdar
- 1974 – 1981: Ganesh Hari Khare
- 1981 – 1983: Hasmukh Dhirajlal Sankalia
- 1984 – 1986: Ramchandra Shankar Walimbe
- 1988 – 1991: Vishwanath Trimbak Shete

== Select publications ==
- Album of Paintings
- Annual Research Reports
- Bibliography and Index of the Mandal's Publications
- Miscellaneous Articles on Indian History
- Proceedings of Research in Pune
- Proceedings of the Annual Conferences
- Quarterly Journals
- Vijayanagar Commemoration Volume
- Sadhan Chikitsa

Records and sources

- Records of the Shivaji's Period
- Persian Sources of Indian History; by G. H. Khare
- Miscellaneous Sources of Indian History
- Sources of Maratha History; by V. K. Rajwade
- Sources of the Medieval History of the Deccan

== See also ==
- Gajanan Mehendale
