= Vadhu Budruk =

Village in Maharashtra

- village
- Country: India
- State: Maharashtra
- District: Pune

Languages
  - Official: Marathi
- Time zone: UTC+5:30 (IST)
- Vehicle registration: MH-
- Coastline: 0 kilometres (0 mi)

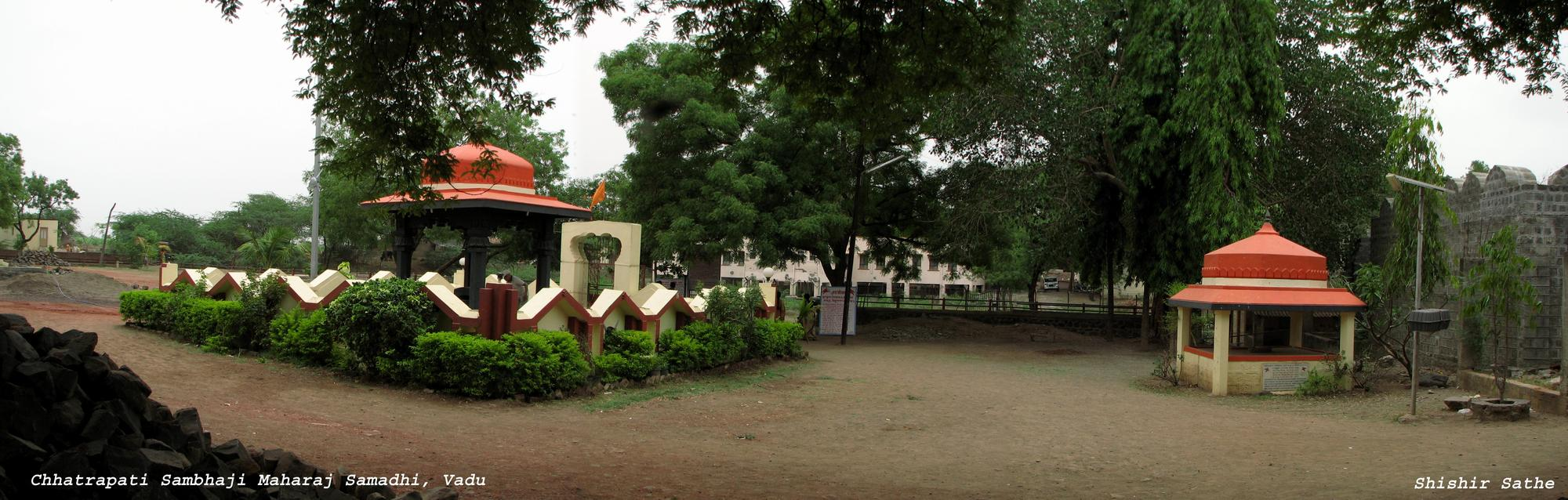
Chatrapati Sambhaji Marahaj's and Kavi Kalash's Samadhi (Mausoleum) at Vadhu

Vadhu Budruk is a village in Shirur tehsil of Pune district.

The importance of this place is, successor of Maratha Empire chatrapati Sambhaji Maharaj I, son of chatrapti Shivaji Maharaj I, brutally executed and killed by Aurangzeb (Mughal king) in Tulapur and his samādhi was built in Vadhu. Thus, both these places are historically very important. Tulapur is situated on the banks of three rivers- Bhima, Bhama and Indrayani.

Tulapur was originally known as Nagargaon.

Vadhu is near Tulapur where Sambhaji and Kavi Kalash last rites were performed by Shivale Deshmukh. An idol of Sambhaji was put up in 1977 in Vadhu along with Gaikwad's tomb.
