= Rajadhyaksha =

Rajadhyaksha is an Indian surname found among Marathi Brahmins. Notable people with the surname include:

- Ashish Rajadhyaksha (born 1957), Indian film scholar
- Gautam Rajadhyaksha (1950–2011), Indian fashion photographer
- M. V. Rajadhyaksha (1913–2010), Indian writer and critic
- Shobha De (née Rajadhyaksha; born 7 January 1948), Indian novelist and columnist
- Vijaya Rajadhyaksha (born 1933), Indian writer, wife of M. V. Rajadhyaksha
