= Samuel Daniell =

British painter

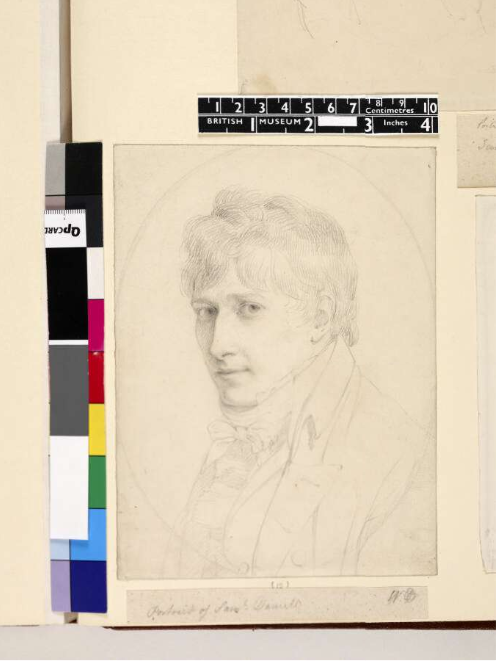
Portrait drawn by his brother, William Daniell

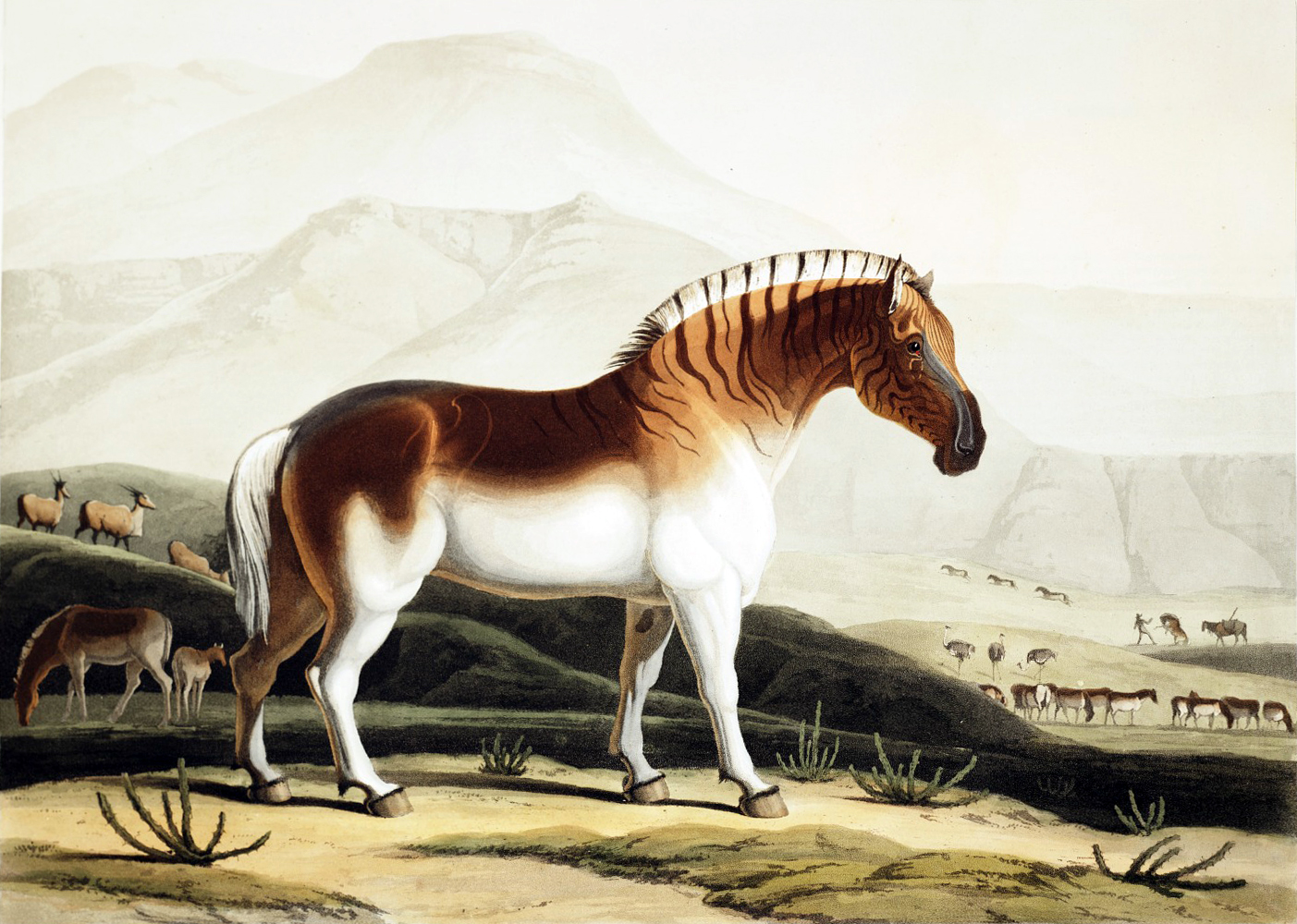
"The Quaka" (Aquatint, 1804)

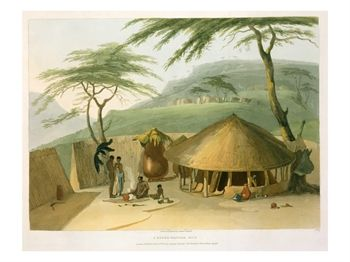
"A Boosh-Wannah Hut" (1804) (Bechuana Hut)

Samuel Daniell (1775 – 16 December 1811) was a British painter of natural history and other scenes in Africa and Ceylon. He first went to the Cape Colony in 1799.

== Life ==
Daniell is perhaps best known as the appointed artist for a 1799-1802 expedition to South Africa and the renderings he did there of African animals. He was born and reared in Chertsey.

In December 1799, he went to South Africa for the first time. The drawings he made in southern Africa, including a journey to Bechuanaland, were published by his brother William Daniell in London. During the trip to Bechuanaland, Daniell was named the official secretary and artist for the trip. The trip went from Cape of Good Hope to Bechuanaland. He returned to England from the trip and co-published with his brothers William Daniell and Thomas Daniell, African Scenery and Animals, in 1804.

Daniell later lived in Sri Lanka, then called Ceylon, from 1806 to 1811, when he died from tropical fever. His brother William published twelve of his drawings in 1806, with the title: A Picturesque Illustration of the Scenery, Animals and Native Inhabitants of Ceylon.

After Samuel Daniell's death, further engravings based on his drawings were published: In 1820, forty-eight lithographs titled Sketches Representing the Native Tribes and Scenery of Southern Africa, and in 1832, Twenty Varied Subjects of the Tribe of Antelopes.

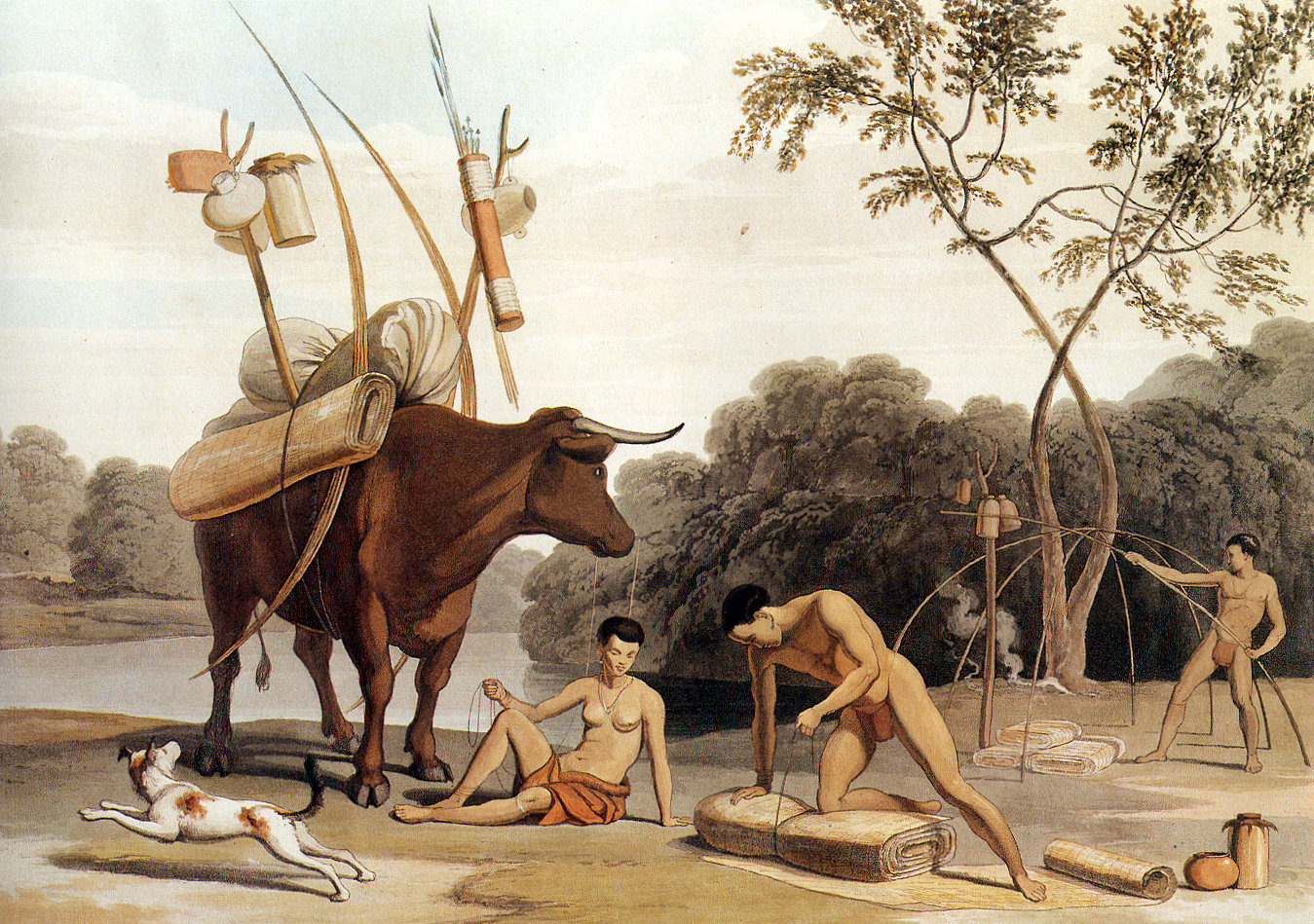
Korah-Khoikhoi dismantling their huts, preparing to move to new pastures. Aquatint 1805.

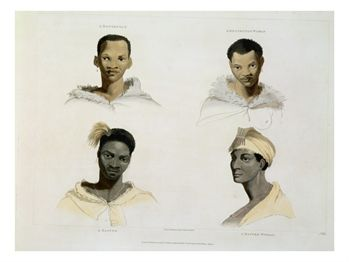
A Hottentot, a Hottentot Woman,
a Kaffre, a Kaffre Woman,
Aquatint 1805

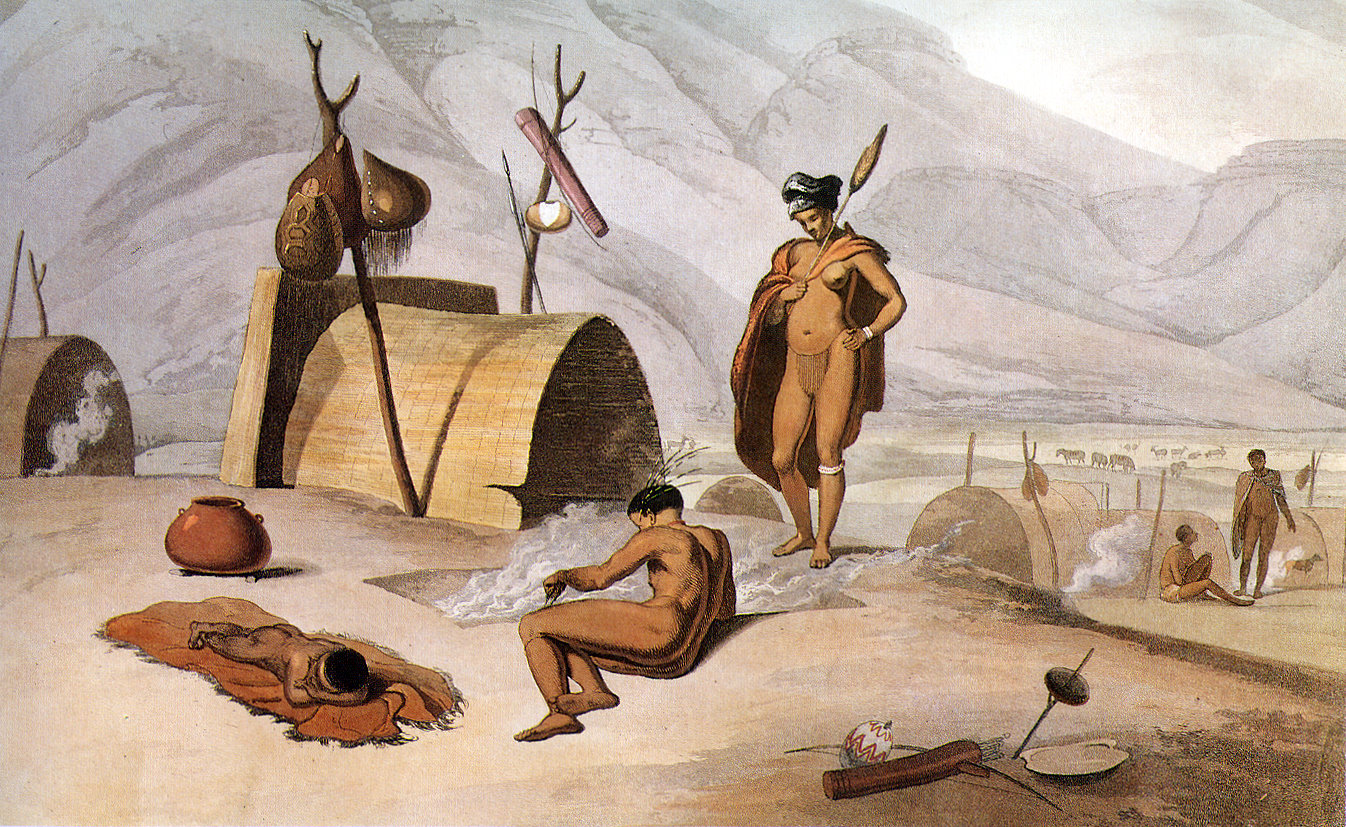
Khoisan busy barbecuing grasshoppers
Aquatint 1804

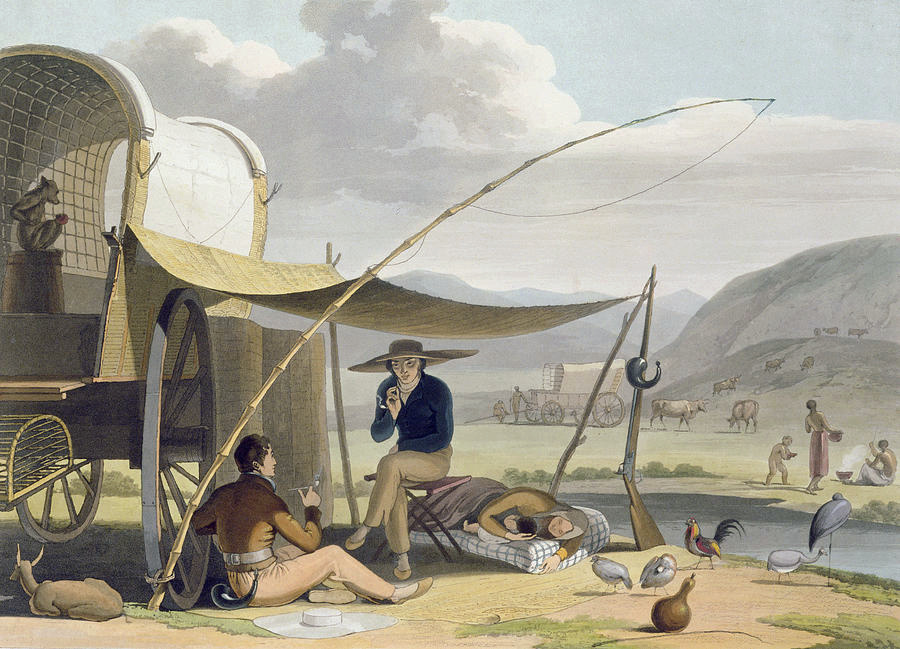
Trekboer making a camp
Aquatint c.1804

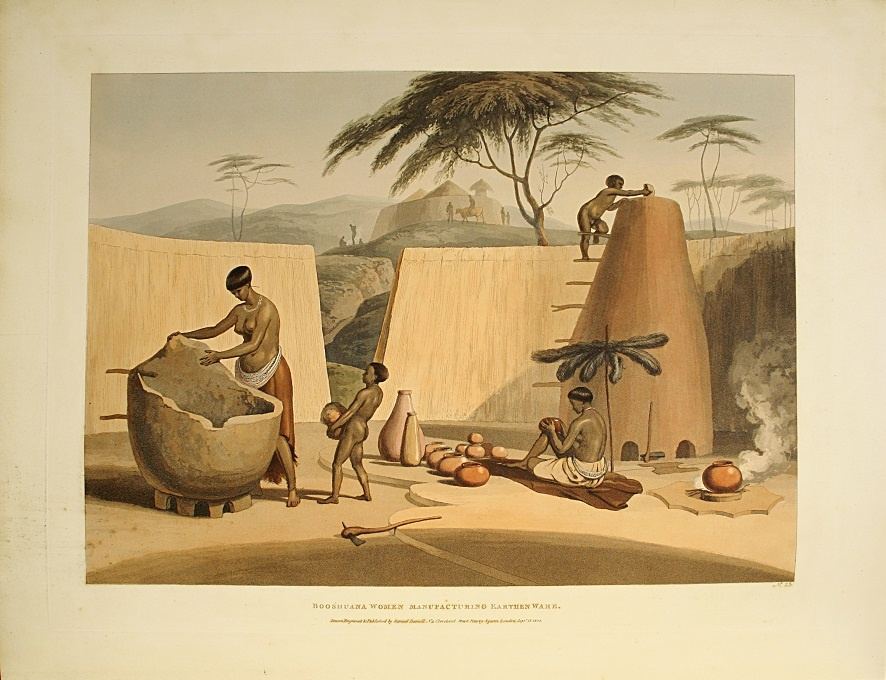
Booshuana women manufacturing earthen ware 1805

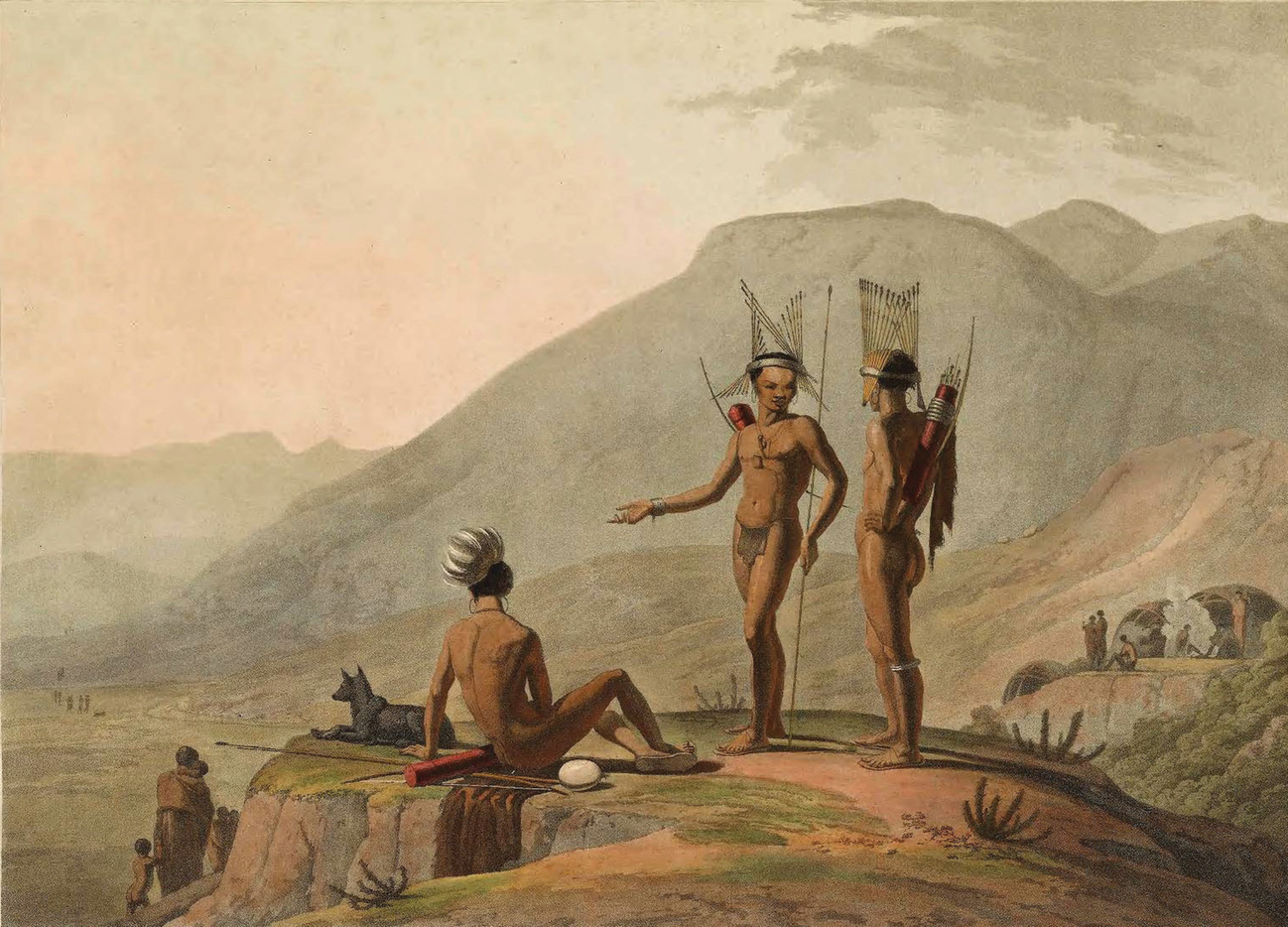
Bushmen Hottentots armed for an expedition 1804
