= Dattatraya Ganesh Godse =

Indian historian, playwright and writer (1914–1992)

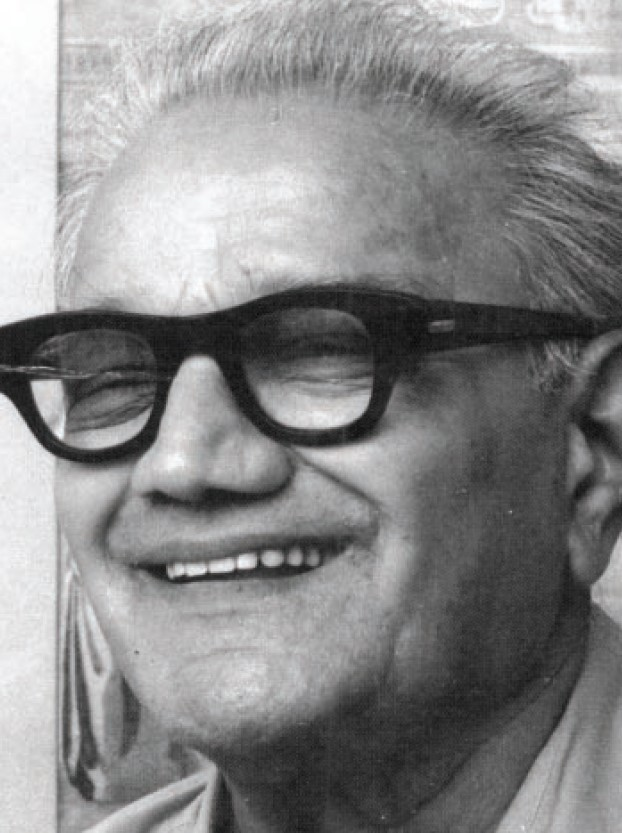
- Born: 3 July 1914; Jalgaon, Bombay Presidency
- Died: 5 January 1992 (aged 77)
- Education: Slade School of Fine Art

Dattatraya Ganesh Godse (3 July 1914 – 5 January 1992) was an Indian historian, playwright, art critic, art director, theatre and costume designer, and illustrator. He received a Sangeet Natak Akademi Award in 1988. He wrote almost exclusively in Marathi.

== Early life and education ==
He was born in Vadhode village in Jalgaon district of Bombay Presidency, British India. He did his schooling in Saoner Nagpur. He attended Morris College, Nagpur and Wilson College, Mumbai. He obtained a Bachelor of Arts degree in Marathi and English. He was also trained in fine arts at Slade School of Fine Art.

- Wife: Sheela Godse,
- Daughter: Medha Keeriyott,
- Son: Anand Godse

== Career ==
Godse wrote on a wide range of subjects: historical figures including Shivaji, Mastani, and Ramdas; literature; plays; architecture; sculpture; and art, including Buddhist art. He wrote an essay on Thomas Daniell's 1790 painting of the Peshwa court at Pune.

In the manner of the historians and critics Vishwanath Kashinath Rajwade, Madhukar Vasudev Dhond, Godse wrote almost exclusively in Marathi.

Ashok R. Kelkar, a scholar in linguistics, literature, and semiotics, commented that Godse's work is "a body of important, if controversial, work in art history from the vitalist point of view." He added that Godse's decision to write in Marathi was "fortunate in so far as it was instrumental in bringing art history home to the Marathi reader."

Godse illustrated many books and magazines. He was theatre designer for over one hundred and seven plays. He also was art director for three Marathi and two Hindi films.

== Books ==
- Vada-Savada Ani Nishada Sama (2003) (Coauthored with M.V. Rajadhyaksha)
- Daphtanī दफ्तनी (1992)

Cover of Godse's book Nangi Asalele Phulapākharū (नांगी असलेले फुलपाखरू), 1989 Publisher Popular Prakashan; The cover is done by Godse himself and the picture there is inspired by James Abbott McNeill Whistler's 'butterfly possessing a long stinger for a tail'

- Nangi Asalele Phulapākharū नांगी असलेले फुलपाखरू (1989)
- Mastānī मस्तानी (1989)
- Ūrjāyana उर्जायन (1985)
- Mātāvala मातावळ (1981)
- Samande Talāśa समंदे तलाश (1981)
- Gatimānī गतिमानी (1976)
- Kālagangechyā Kāthī काळगंगेच्या काठी (1974)
- Shakti Saushthava शक्ती सौष्ठव (1972)
- Pota पोत (1963)
- Lokghati लोकघाटी
- Pratima प्रतिमा (translation)
- Shakuntala शाकुन्तल (Translation of Abhijñānaśākuntalam)
- Song सोंग
- Sambhajiche Bhoot संभाजीचे भूत
- Kahi Kavadse काही कवडसे
- Essay on Dinanath Dalal: 'The Genius from an Enchanted land’
