= Damu Kenkre =

Indian director (1928–2008)

- Born: Damodar Kashinath Kenkre; 1928; Margão, Goa, Portuguese India
- Died: 2008 (aged 79–80); Mumbai, Maharashtra, India
- Occupation: Director
- Relatives: 1
- Awards: Sangeet Natak Akademi Award (1974); Vinda Karandikar Jeevan Gaurav Puraskar (2008)

Damu Kenkre (born Damodar Kashinath Kenkre; 1928 – 2008) was an Indian director known for his work in the Marathi theatre.

== Stage career ==
Some of Kenkre's most famous plays include Hamlet, Suryachi Pille and Akhercha Sawaal.

== Awards ==
Kenkre received the Sangeet Natak Akademi Award in 1974 and the Vinda Karandikar Jeevan Gaurav Puraskar in 2008. He was ex-Director of Cultural Affairs Govt of Maharashtra.

== Death ==
Kenkre died in September 2008.
