= William Daniell =

English painter and printmaker

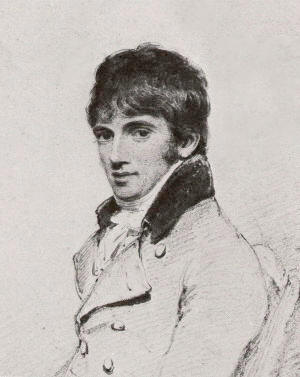
Fragment of a portrait of Daniell by Richard Westall

William Daniell RA (1769 – 16 August 1837) was an English painter and printmaker who specialised in landscape painting and marine art. He travelled extensively in India in the company of his uncle Thomas Daniell, with whom he collaborated on one of the finest illustrated works of the period – Oriental Scenery. He later travelled around the coastline of Britain to paint watercolours for the equally ambitious book A Voyage Round Great Britain. His work was exhibited at the Royal Academy and the British Institution and he became a Royal Academician in 1822.

== Early life ==
William Daniell was born in Kingston upon Thames, Surrey. His father was a bricklayer and owner of a public house called The Swan in nearby Chertsey. Daniell's future was dramatically changed when he was sent to live with his uncle, the landscape artist Thomas Daniell (1749–1840) after his father's premature death in 1779. In 1784 William accompanied his uncle to India, who worked there on a series of prints, acting as his assistant in preparing drawings and sketches. William's brother Samuel Daniell remained independent of his uncle and also became a topographical artist; he went to South Africa in 1801 and after his return to England published African Scenery and Animals (1804–5), a collection of aquatints. From 1806 he lived in Ceylon.

== India ==
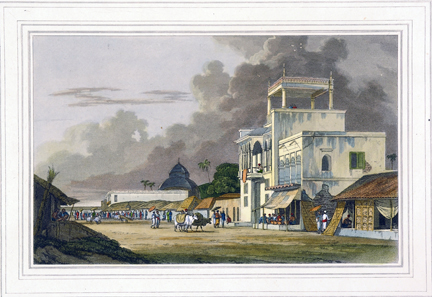
View on the Chitpore Road, Calcutta (now Rabindra Sarani, Kolkata), by Thomas Daniell and William Daniell (1812)

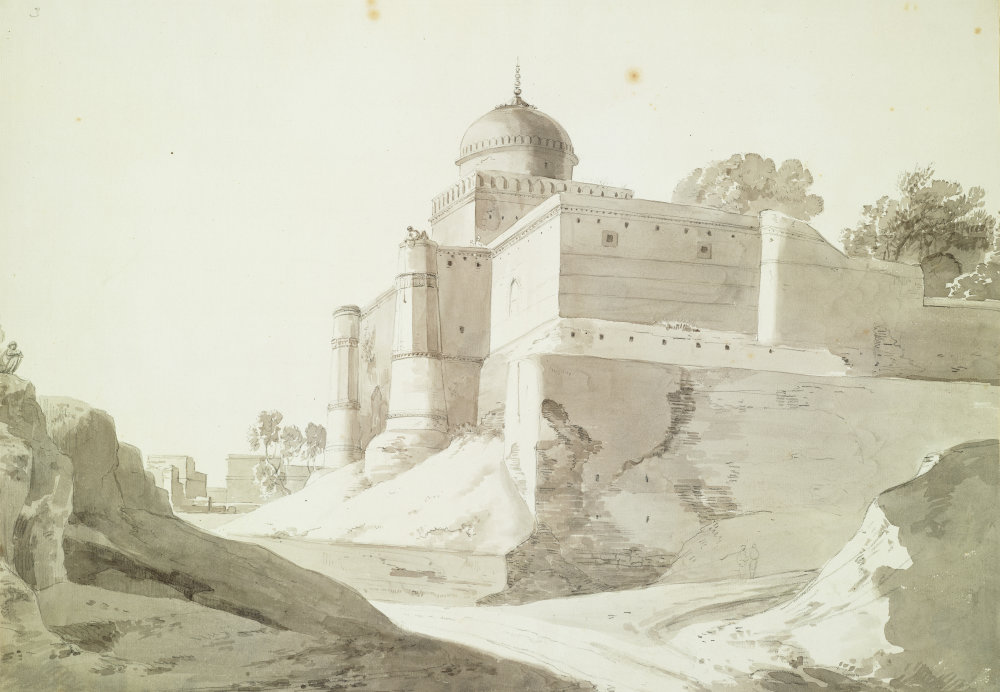
One of the earliest pencil and wash drawings of a Perspective view of Shahi Jama Masjid, Sambhal, Created by William Daniell and Thomas Daniell, dated 24 March 1789.

Daniell was sixteen when he accompanied his uncle to India. On 17 July 1786, a few months after their arrival in Calcutta, Thomas Daniell placed an advertisement in the Calcutta Chronicle, announcing the forthcoming publication of a set of twelve views of the city. This seemed a promising idea, since Calcutta was rapidly expanding and its European inhabitants might be willing to buy prints showing its latest buildings. Both he and William were inexperienced printmakers and had to enlist the help of Indian craftsmen, but the set, executed in aquatint, was completed in November 1788 and sold well. Thomas then began planning an ambitious tour of northern India where he made one pencil and wash drawings of Shahi Jama Masjid at Sambhal in 1789, possibly inspired by the wealth of picturesque scenery indicated in William Hodges's collection of aquatints, Select Views in India (1785–8). In August 1789, Thomas and William set off up-river past Murshidabad to Bhagalpur, where they stayed with Samuel Davis (1760–1819), an employee of the East India Company and a skilled amateur artist. They continued on to Kanpur and then travelled overland to Delhi, visiting Agra, Fatehpur Sikri and Mathura on the way; the following April they made a pioneering tour to Srinagar, Uttarakhand and Garhwal in the Himalayas.

Thomas and William Daniell were back in Calcutta at the end of 1791. They held a lottery of their completed work, using the proceeds to fund a tour to the South. Since the Third Mysore War was in progress, the Daniells suspected that a market existed among the British for oil paintings and drawings of the areas in which the conflict was taking place. They duly visited various hill-forts on their way south, as well as the huge and richly carved temples at Madurai, Mamallapuram and Rameswaram. Once back in Madras they held another lottery of their work and set off on a tour to western India. On their arrival in Bombay in March 1793 they met James Wales (1747–95), then busy drawing the area's cave temples. He took them to Elephanta, Karli and Kanheri among other places.

== Return to England ==
In September 1794 the Daniells returned to England. Over the period 1784 to 1794 William had kept a detailed diary of their travels. This is now in the British Library. After 1794 he no longer kept a diary and so we have no information in his own hand about the rest of his life. The Royal Academician, Joseph Farington, himself a landscape painter and topographical draughtsman, kept a diary from 1793 until he died in 1821. The Daniells were close friends of Farington. John Garvey has gone through the diary and extracted glimpses of William's private life and of his artistic work. The diaries are almost the only written record we have of the life of William Daniell.

In 1794, William and his uncle set up house at 37 Howland Street, Fitzroy Square. Their first priority was to publish a selection of their paintings of India. The views that were selected were made into aquatint, calling upon William's hard-earned skills in this delicate medium. Farington records in his diary that William Daniell had informed him that after his return to England he spent the next seven years working from six in the morning until midnight perfecting his aquatinting techniques.

== Financial success ==
The Daniells' great work on India, Oriental Scenery, was published in six parts over the period 1795–1808. It comprised a total of 144 coloured aquatints and six uncoloured title-pages. The cost of a complete set was £210. The publication was a success, both artistically and financially. Thirty sets were sold to the East India Company, and a further order for eighteen copies was received. Thomas Sutton in his book The Daniells: Artists and Travellers (1954), quotes a glowing tribute to the work of the Daniells from the Calcutta Monthly magazine:

The execution of these drawings is indeed masterly; there is every reason to confide in the fidelity of the representations; and the effect produced by this rich and splendid display of oriental scenery is truly striking. In looking at it, one may almost feel the warmth of an Indian sky, the water seems to be in actual motion, and the animals, trees and plants are studies for the naturalist.

Further different versions of Indian scenes were published, and details can be found in Sutton's book, together with a detailed inventory of all the artistic output of Thomas, Samuel and William Daniell.

Oriental Scenery took its place among such revered works as James Stuart and Nicholas Revett's Antiquities of Athens (1762), Baron Denon's Voyage dans la basse et la haute Egypte (1802) and Robert Wood's Ruins of Palmyra (1753) and Ruins of Balbek (1757). It provided an entirely new vision of the Indian subcontinent that was to influence both decorative arts and British architectural design. Above all, it formed a popular vision in Britain of a romantic and picturesque India that to some extent persists.

Daniell's years after 1804 included making 72 etchings after George Dance's highly finished pencil profile portraits of Regency London's artistic establishment, A Collection of Portraits, published over ten years from 1804. Many are now held by the National Portrait Gallery. Daniell contributed drawings for Rees's Cyclopædia, but these have not been identified.

== A Voyage Round Great Britain ==
In 1813 Daniell decided to undertake what was to be his greatest artistic work, A Voyage Round Great Britain. His plan was to journey around the whole coast and record views of places of interest. An integral part of the venture was to provide a running commentary, which described the scenery and the conditions of the people. Daniell had already made excursions in England, Wales, and Scotland, so he had a good idea of where to go and what he might find by way of subjects for paintings.

The original intention was to make a coastal trip by sea, but it became clear early on in the venture that this was not practicable, and most of the journey around the coast had to be made by road. The journey was completed in six separate trips, over the period 1813 to 1823. In the summer of 1813, Daniell and his companion, Richard Ayton, who was to write the accompanying text, covered the coast from Land's End to Holyhead. The following year in August they went from Holyhead to Kirkcudbright. Richard Ayton did not accompany Daniell on the rest of the journey, leaving Daniell to sketch the scenery and also write the text. Daniell's approach was to make pencil sketches of views that looked interesting, annotating them with details of colour and texture. The sketches included people and scenery. The transfer of the picture from paper to copper in the form of an aquatint plate required great artistic skill and dexterity. The process is very delicate. This was done on his return to London, as was the printing and colouring of the prints. Daniell must have had a very good visual memory of the places he had visited, as up to five years elapsed between the production of the sketches and the prints being completed.

In 1815, Daniell set out in May and travelled north to Wigtown. It is likely that he took the Mail Coach, a journey of 4 to 5 days. On his way north, he stopped at Edinburgh and took advice from many people there on the places to visit on the coast up and around the north of Scotland. The novelist Walter Scott not only advised Daniell on the places to visit in Scotland, but also provided him with material for inclusion in the accompanying text. Friends in Edinburgh were able to give Daniell letters of introduction to people who might be willing to provide hospitality to him on his journey. This was important, as there were few hostelries, and their quality generally not high.

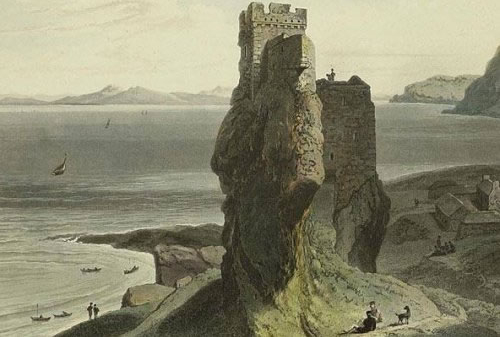
Castle Broichin on the Isle of Raasay (1819)

During July and August 1815, Daniell journeyed around the islands of Eigg, Rum, Skye, and Raasay, together with the Hebridean Islands of Harris and Lewis. He continued up the west coast of Scotland, around the north coast, out to the Orkney Islands, and then down the east coast as far south as Dundee, arriving in Dundee in October 1815. When setting out from London in May, he had not planned to cover so much of the coastline on one visit, but the weather in 1815 was exceptionally favourable, with good visibility and clear skies providing perfect conditions for an artist. This mammoth journey resulted in 139 aquatint prints being finally published, the last completed in 1821.

In August 1821 Daniell once again journeyed north to St Andrews. During August and September he went around the coast as far as Southend, finding 28 subjects from which he produced prints. In the period July to September 1822, his journey as far as Torquay, along the popular south coast of England, resulted in a total of 52 published prints, and August and September 1823 brought Daniell back to Land's End, with a further 31 prints. The final prints of A Voyage Round Great Britain were published on 20 May 1825.

A Voyage Round Great Britain was published by Longman in eight volumes over the period 1814 to 1825. The complete set of eight volumes was priced at £60. The final number of prints included was 308. Garvey's book follows Daniell around part of the voyage, the Hebridean islands of Eigg, Rum, Skye and Raasay, locating the viewpoints included in his aquatint prints.

Over the period 1813 to 1825, in parallel with preparing the prints for the Voyage, Daniell was busy on other projects, which included paintings for the Academy Exhibitions. Many of the works exhibited were oil paintings of Scottish scenes. The artistic quality of the paintings and aquatints produced and published by Daniell for A Voyage Round Great Britain was considered to be very high. The atmospheric effects which he was able to convey in the aquatint medium were quite overwhelming. This was particularly true of his portrayal of ships and maritime scenery, as he had demonstrated in many earlier paintings and prints. In February 1822 after many years of endeavour, Daniell was finally elected an R.A. In the final ballot the voting was between John Constable and Daniell, the result being 11 to 17.

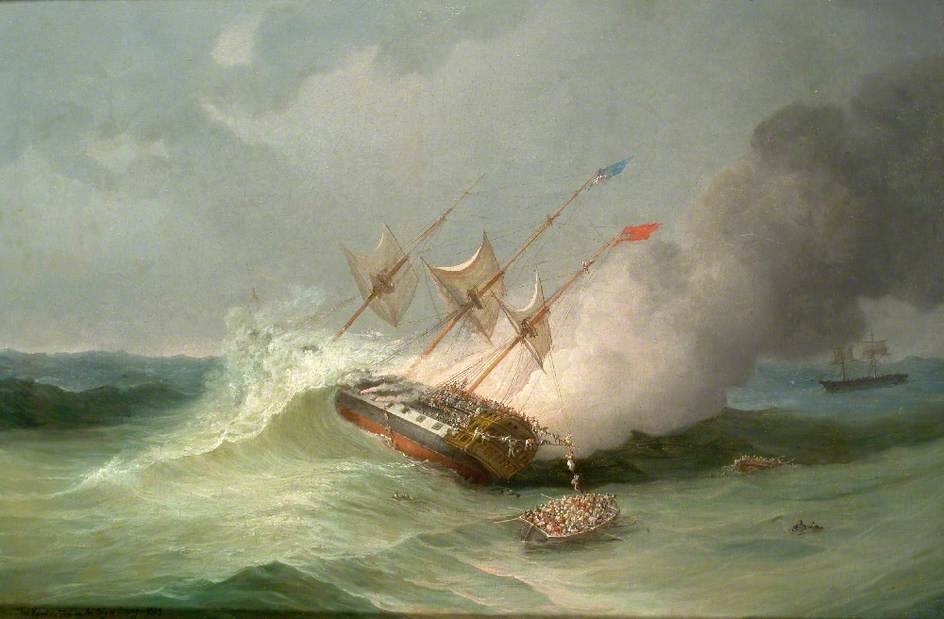
Burning of 'The Kent', 1st March 1825 (c. 1827)

William produced a number of marine paintings. One, The Burning of the "Kent" is in the Museum of the Queen's Royal Surrey's, having been rediscovered after having disappeared for over a hundred years. It is an illustration of the dramatic loss of the East Indiaman Kent, and the rescue of some 550 survivors of her 650 crew and passengers. His shipping scenes, such A Bird's-Eye View of the East India Dock at Blackwell (National Maritime Museum, London), were supplemented by greatly admired battle pieces. In 1825, he won a prize of £100 for a pair of paintings depicting the Battle of Trafalgar, exhibited at the British Institution. Daniell turned to panorama painting before his death, beginning in 1832 with a painting of Madras, including a depiction of the Hindu mode of taming wild elephants.

Daniell's last great artistic work was produced between 1827 and 1830. Over this time he became interested in the scenery around Windsor. In 1827, 1828 and 1830, he exhibited a total of five oil paintings of Windsor Castle and its surroundings and two oil paintings of Virginia Water, at the Royal Academy Exhibitions. These were considered to be among his finest oil paintings, and according to Sutton, his view of the Long Walk at Windsor was generally acknowledged to be his masterpiece in oils. Daniell produced a set of 12 aquatints of the Windsor and Virginia water views. Sutton writes of this series:

These twelve prints are the finest aquatints ever made, standing alone at the highest possible peak: aquatint could go no further, and although attempts have been made by others to excel them, none succeeded. The prints were made in Daniell's usual way, engraved by himself from his own drawings, and published by himself at 14, Russell Place, Fitzroy Square. By this time he was a comparatively wealthy man, and one can imagine him lovingly and carefully tinting the plates, leisurely savouring their subtle beauties, unhampered by time or financial worry. We feel, in looking at these aquatints, that perhaps Daniell, with the philosophy of a much-travelled man, realised that in the cool greys and greens with which he "stained" his prints was the charm of his own land, more enduring than the exotic mystery of the Orient or the strange architecture of Hindistan.

Daniell worked right up to his death, on 16 August 1837 at Brecknock Terrace, Camden Town (now 135 St Pancras Way). The house is marked by a commemorative plaque. He submitted five pictures to the Royal Academy Summer Exhibition in that year. The final twist in the story of A Voyage Round Great Britain, was the discovery, in 1962, of 306 of the original 308 Daniell copper plates, the location of which had not been known for more than 100 years. They are now the property of the Tate. It seems appropriate that of all the topographical books of the 19th century it should be copper plates for Daniell's Voyage Round Great Britain that have survived – they are a monument to his industry and his unsurpassed skill in handling the remarkable delicacy of the aquatint process.

== Published works ==
Among his publications, engraved in aquatint, were:

- Voyage to India
- Zoography
- Animated Nature
- Views of London
- Views of Bootan, a work prepared from his uncle's sketches
- A Voyage Round Great Britain, which occupied him for several years.

== Collections ==
Daniell is represented in the following collections, among others: National Portrait Gallery, London; Royal Academy of Arts, London; National Maritime Museum, London; Courtauld Institute of Art, London; Victoria and Albert Museum, London; Yale Center for British Art; Fine Arts Museums of San Francisco; National Museums and Galleries of Wales, Cardiff; Indianapolis Museum of Art, US; Falmouth Art Gallery, Falmouth, UK; Dallas Museum of Art, Texas; Watford Museum, Watford, UK; National Museum of India, New Delhi.

== Gallery ==
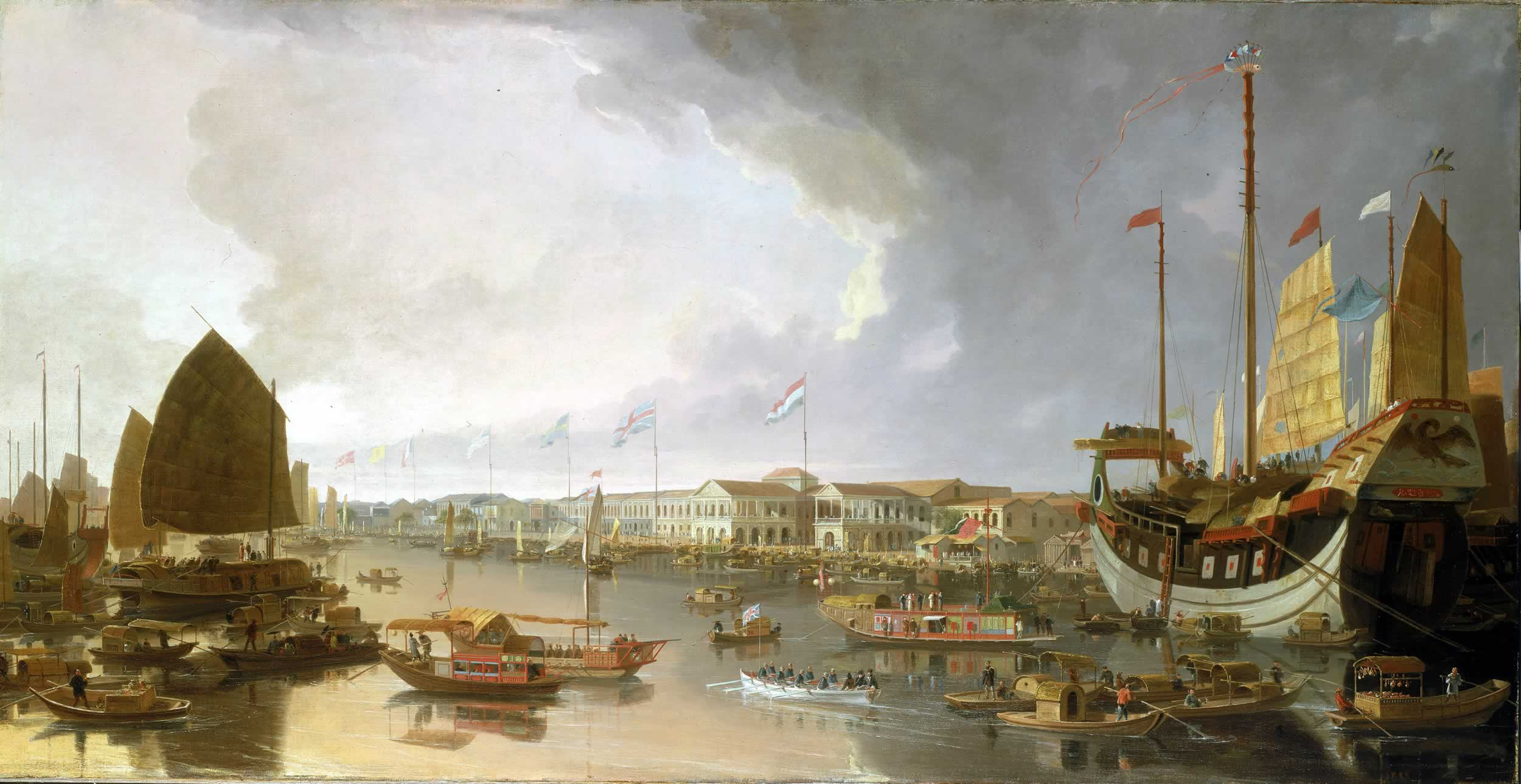
View of the Canton factories (c. 1805–10)

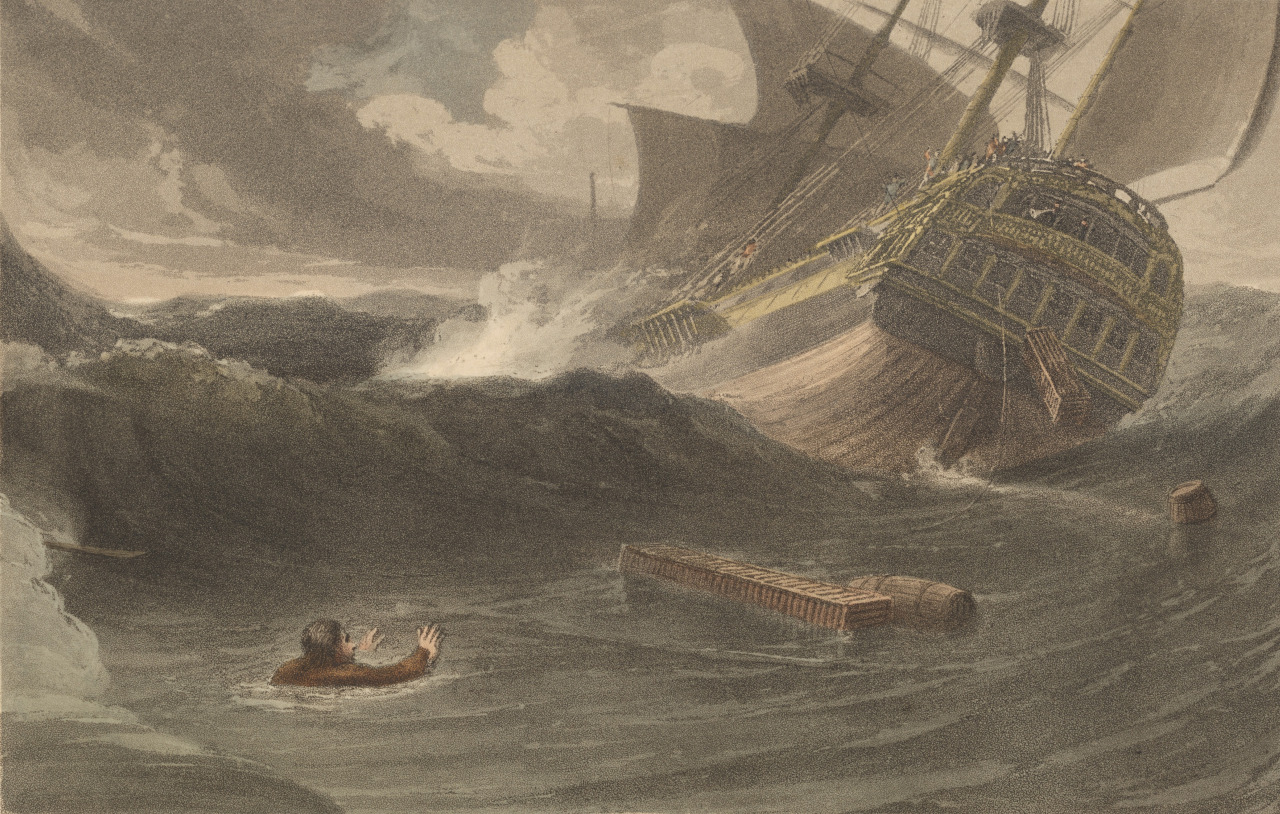
A man overboard. Drawing by Thomas Daniell & William Daniell (1810)

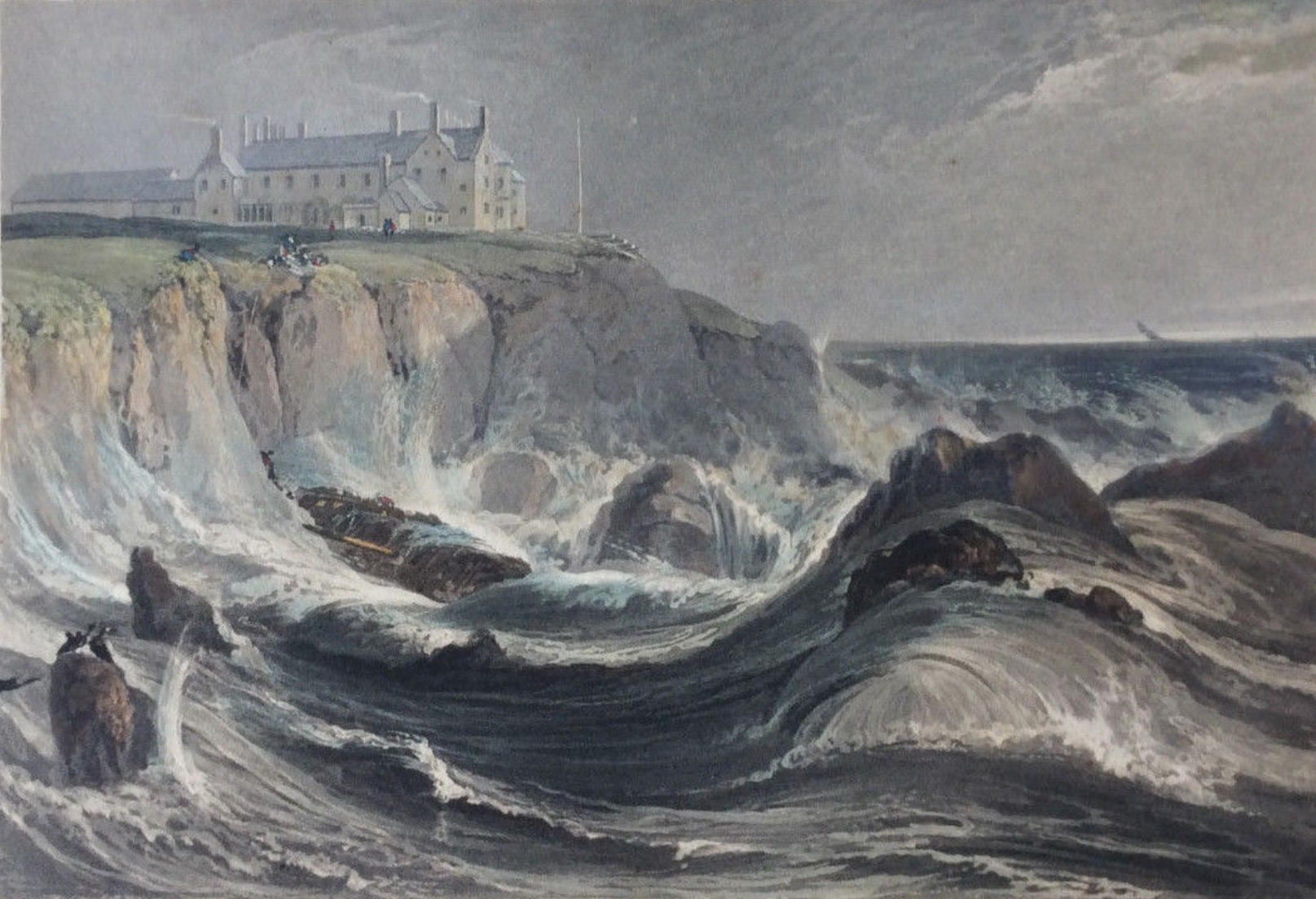
Slanes Castle, Aberdeenshire (c. 1822)

Windsor Castle from Brocas Meadow (1827)

Windsor from Eton (1827)

Long Walk, Windsor Park (1827)

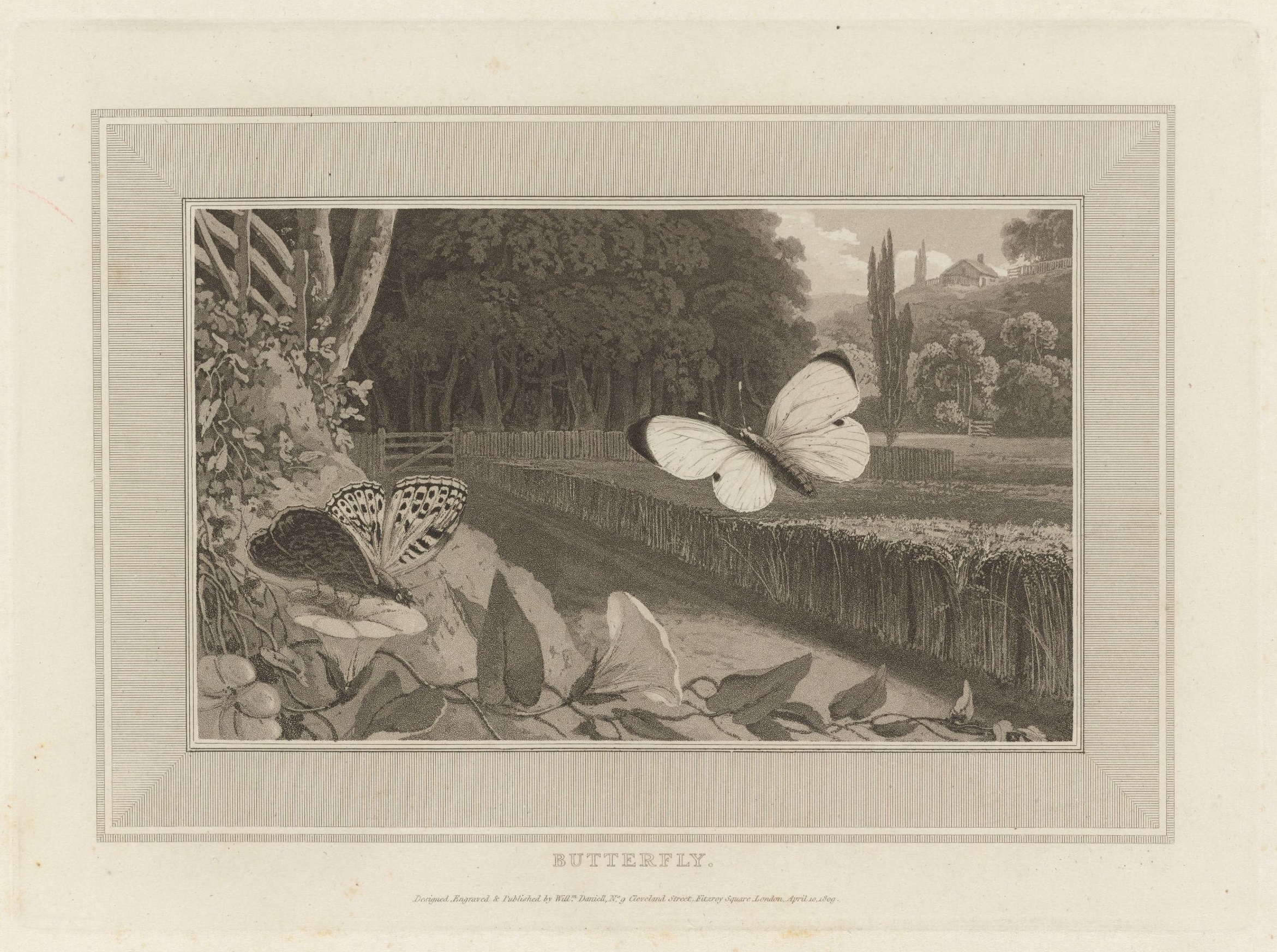
Illustration from Interesting Selections from Animated Nature, 1809
