= Richard Ayton =

Richard Ayton (1786–1823), was an English dramatist and miscellaneous writer.

== Life ==
Ayton was born in London in 1786 to William (d. 1799) and Mary Ayton. His father, a son of William Ayton, banker in Lombard Street, later moved to Macclesfield, Cheshire, and at its grammar school Ayton obtained a knowledge of Latin and Greek. In accordance with the wish of his father, who died in 1799, he was sent to study law at Manchester, and at the end of a year became the pupil of a barrister in London; but he never set himself seriously to prepare for a career. As soon as he came of age, he retired to the coast of Sussex, and resolved to live within his comparatively small income.

In 1811 he returned to London, and accepted a situation in a public office; but this he relinquished in 1813, to accompany William Daniell A.R.A., in a voyage round Great Britain. An account of the voyage, with views drawn and engraved by Daniell, appeared in 8 vols. folio, 1814–25; but the letterpress of only the first two volumes is by Ayton. Disagreeing with Daniell over his plans for the future volumes, Ayton declined to proceed further with the book, and started play-writing. Two of his farces, acted at Covent Garden, were failures; but he adapted from the French several pieces for the English Opera House with moderate success.

During a voyage between Scarborough and London, Ayton was nearly shipwrecked, and received an injury to his ankle which confined him to bed for more than a year. In the spring of 1821 he was sufficiently recovered to go to the coast of Sussex, but his health continued uncertain and precarious. In July 1823 his illness became serious; he moved for medical advice to London, but died shortly afterwards.

During the last 18 months of his life Ayton occupied himself with light-hearted essays, chiefly on pastimes. These, with a short memoir prefixed, were published in 1825.
