= Kent (1820 ship) =

Vessel sailing for the British East India Company

Coordinates: 47°30′N 9°45′W

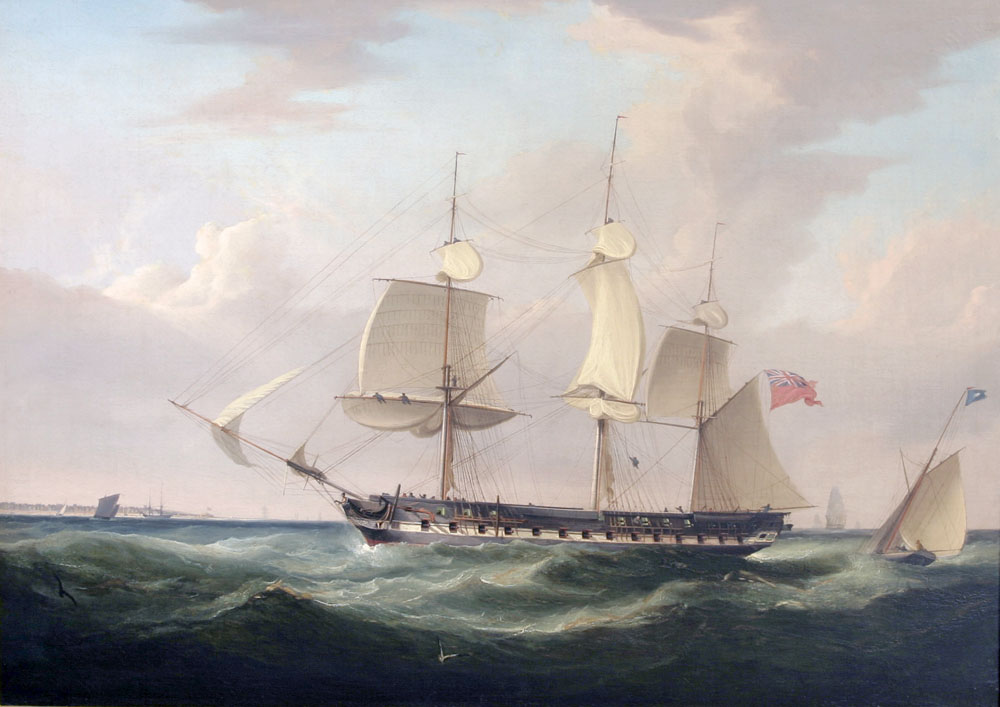
- c. 1825 painting of Kent by William John Huggins

History

United Kingdom
- Name: Kent
- Owner: Stewart Marjoribanks (principal managing owner)
- Operator: British East India Company
- Builder: Wigram & Green, Blackwall
- Launched: 6 December 1820
- Fate: Lost in a fire at sea 1825

General characteristics
- Type: East Indiaman
- Tons burthen: 1332, or 142191/94 (bm)
- Length: 133 ft 0 in (40.5 m) (overall); 116 ft 4 in (35.5 m) (keel)
- Beam: 43 ft 3 in (13.2 m)
- Depth of hold: 17 ft 1 in (5.2 m)
- Complement: 140

The Kent was an East Indiaman, a vessel sailing for the British East India Company, and launched in 1820. She completed two voyages to Bombay and China for the Company and was on her third voyage, to Bengal and China, when a fire in the Bay of Biscay destroyed her. Her captain for all three voyages was Henry Cobb.

== Voyages 1 & 2 ==
=== Voyage #1 (1821-1822) ===
Kent left Cowes on 14 March 1821 and reached Bombay on 10 June. She arrived in Singapore on 29 August, and Whampoa anchorage on 24 September. On her return leg she crossed the Second Bar on 29 December. She reached St Helena on 2 May 1822, and arrived at The Downs on 27 June.

=== Voyage #2 (1823-1824) ===
On her second voyage, Kent left The Downs on 7 January 1823, reaching New Anchorage on 9 May. From there she reached Penang on 1 August and Singapore on 21 August. A little more than a month later, on 30 September, she arrived at Whampoa. Kent crossed the Second Bar on 16 November, reached St Helena on 7 February 1824, and arrived back at The Downs on 22 March.

== Third voyage ==
Kent left the Downs on 19 February 1825, with 20 officers and 344 soldiers belonging to the 31st Regiment of Foot, 43 women and 66 children, 20 private passengers, and a crew (including officers) of 148 men. In all, there were 641 persons on board.

=== Loss ===
A report from 1832 states:

THE SHIP ON FIRE,

On the 1st of March 1825, the Kent East Indiaman took fire in the Bay of Biscay. She had sailed from the Downs about the middle of February, being bound for Bengal and China. By the roll of the vessel, a cask of spirits had been displaced; and, as the men were about to fix it in its former position, a heavy sea struck the ship, and precipitated a candle from the hands of one of them. This, falling on a small portion of the spirits, which had escaped from the cask, produced an instant conflagration, which defied every effort to stay its progress. At this awful crisis, the Cambria, Captain Cook, bound from London to Mexico, having on board thirty-five miners and superintendents of the Anglo-Mexican company, hove in sight. Seeing a signal of distress, Captain Cook instantly bore down; and, on approaching the Kent, discovered her to be on fire. Not a moment was lost in rendering every possible assistance and transferring the crew and passengers to the brig. Throughout the whole of this affair, there appears to have been a very obvious display of providential superintendence. The Cambria could not, as we are informed, have fallen in with the Kent, had not Captain Cook been induced to lie to for the purpose of repairing the bulwarks of his vessel. It is also stated, that if the Cambria, on her return to Falmouth, had been detained by the wind a day or two longer, it must have occasioned deplorable discomfort on board his vessel, a brig of two hundred tons, with more than 600 souls crowded together in her cabin and on her deck. But for this timely interference, 547 lives must inevitably have been lost.

=== Rescue ===
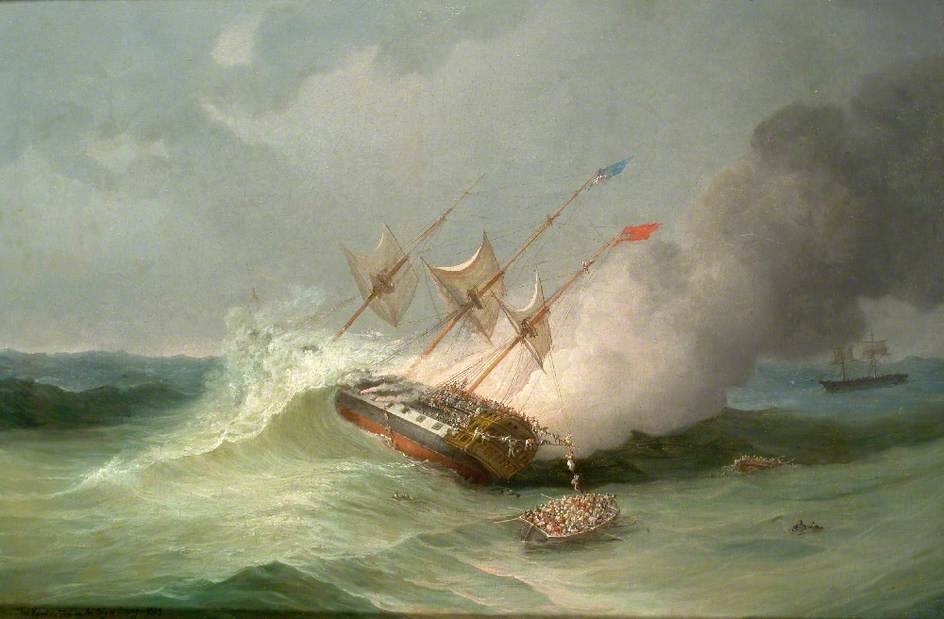
Burning of 'The Kent', 1st March 1825 (William Daniell, c. 1827)

By chance the brigantine Cambria saw Kent's distress signal. Cambria, a small vessel bound for Mexico with a crew of 11 men, was transporting some 20 Cornish miners. (Note: Cambria was of 120 tons (bm), and had been launched at Aberdeen in 1808. She was under the command of a Captain Barham.) The crew and miners worked tirelessly to rescue survivors, fully cognizant of the risk that the Kent's magazine might explode at any time. There were instances of men who tied the children of brother soldiers on their backs, and leaping overboard swam with their burdens to the boats. By the following evening, Cambria had some 550 survivors aboard her.

The crew of the ill-fated Kent however did not behave as well as the miners or soldiers. They refused to return for their shipmates after the first trip until the captain of the Cambria threatened not to let them board unless they did so.

At 2 a.m. the Kent did explode. Two hours after she blew up, a soldier's wife gave birth on board Cambria. The following morning Caroline rescued 14 of the men who remained on the wreck and carried them to Liverpool. Cambria landed her survivors back in Falmouth three days later. The miners and others associated with the rescue received silver medals in recognition of their courage and efforts.

=== Losses ===
Eighty-one people lost their lives: 54 soldiers, one woman, 20 children, one seaman, and five boys. The EIC put the value of its cargo lost on Kent at £17,980.

== The Kent in art and literature ==
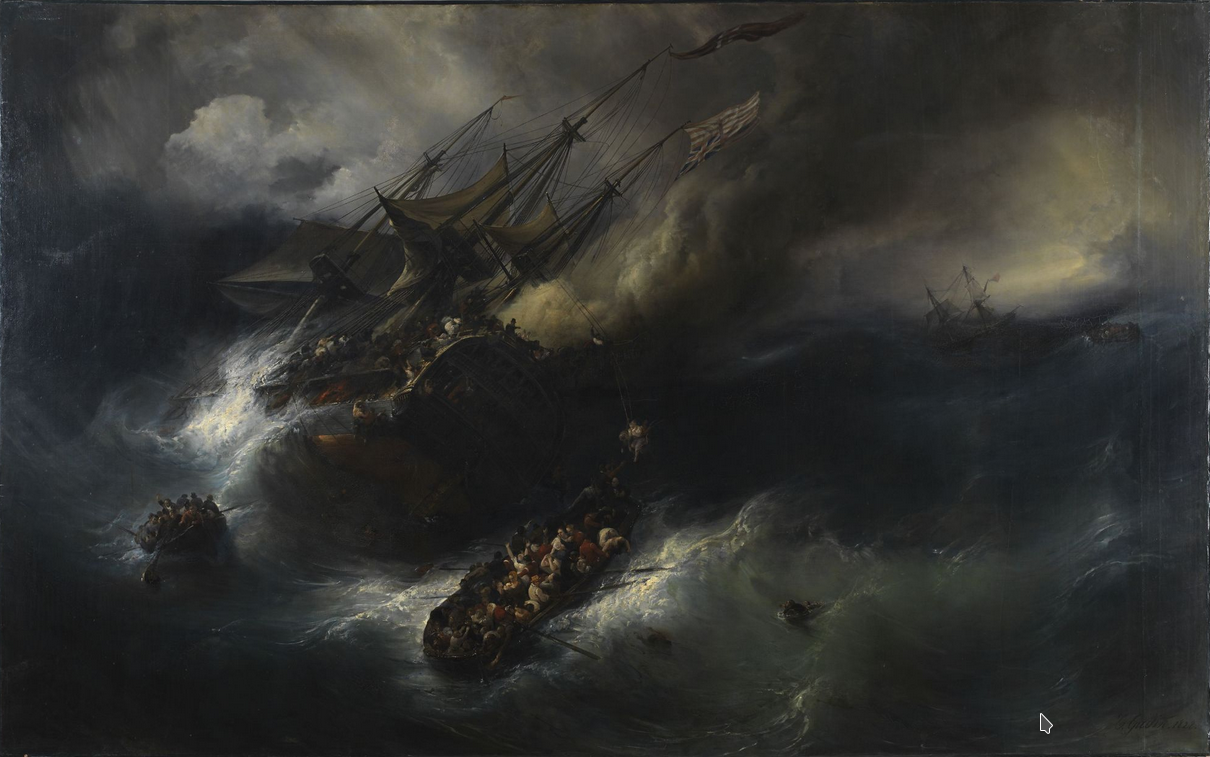
Loss of the Kent, Théodore Gudin, Musée national de la Marine, Paris

The loss of the Kent was highly newsworthy and led a number of artists to paint their own versions of the tragedy. In addition to William Daniell, artists that dealt with the tragedy included Théodore Gudin, Thomas Marie Madawaska Hemy (1874–1931), and an anonymous lithographer whose "Loss of the Kent" is in the National Maritime Museum, as are a number of other renditions. (The National Maritime Museum Cornwall has an aquatint of Daniell's painting.) Thomas Buttersworth (1768–1842) also painted "The East Indiaman Kent on Fire in the Bay of Biscay".

The loss of the Kent was later commemorated in a poem by William McGonagall.
