= Pachola (novel) =

- Author: R. R. Borade
- Translator: Sudhakar Marathe
- Language: Marathi
- Genre: Novel
- Set in: Marathwada, Maharashtra, India.
- Publication date: 1971
- Publication place: India
- English publication date: 1999

Pachola (पाचोळा), Fall, is a short, Marathi-language novel written by R. R. Borade. Published in 1971, Pachola is a story of Parvati, wife of a tailor, through emotional stresses created in the lives of village craftsmen because of modernization. The story is narrated from the viewpoint of Parvati and describes the pathetic fall of her family life. It is written in Osmanabadi dialect of Marathi, which gives it a rural flavour and lends it authenticity and charm.

Pachola established R. R. Borade's reputation as a fiction writer. Sudhakar Marathe translated it into English as Fall, which was published by National Book Trust in 1999.
