= Anuradha Patil =

Indian Marathi-language poet

- Born: 5 April 1953 (age 73); Pahur, Maharashtra
- Occupation: Poet
- Writing career
- Language: Marathi
- Notable awards: Sahitya Akademi Award (2019); Vinda Karandikar Jeevan Gaurav Puraskar (2019)

Anuradha Patil (born 5 April 1953) is an Indian poet, writing in the Marathi language. In 2019, she won the Sahitya Akademi Award, India's highest literary honor, for her collection of poetry Kadachit Ajoonahi.

== Biography ==
Patil was born in Pahur, Maharashtra, into a family of farmers. She received no formal education after high school. She married Kautikrao Thale Patil, a teacher and professor of Marathi literature, at the age of 21. She lives in Aurangabad.

== Career ==
=== Writing ===
Patil began writing poetry at the age of 20, and in 1982, won an award from the State of Maharashtra's literary academy, the Maharashtra Sahitya Parishad for her collection titled Digant. In 1986, she won an award from the Maharashtra Sahitya Parishad for her second collection of poetry, Tarihee. Patil subsequently published three other collections of poetry: Divasendivas, Darasal and Waaluchya Paatrat Manndalela Khel. In 2017, she published a collection of poetry titled Kadachit Ajoonahi (tr. Perhaps, Still) which won the 2019 Sahitya Akademi Award in Marathi (India's highest literary honor). The Sahitya Akademi praised Patil's poetry, stating that it was "...seminal in content and form," and praising her other writing as well, including her literary criticism and essays which have been published as parts of edited works. Her writing deals with accounts of rural life in Maharashtra, particularly her native region of Marathwada and Khandesh, and of the lives of women, covering themes of nature, motherhood, and solitude. Her poetry has been widely translated into other Indian languages, including Hindi and Rajasthani.

=== Positions held ===
Patil has held a number of positions in literary organisations and academies in India, and on editorial boards for literary magazines. From 1977 to 1980 she was a member of the Marathwada Sahitya Parishad, a literary academy for the region of Marathwada in Maharashtra. She has been closely associated with the Sahitya Akademi, India's national academy for arts and letters: from 1993 to 1997, she was a member of their advisory board for Marathi language writing and literature, and from 2003 to 2007 she was a member of their general council. She has been an editor and advisor for the Marathi literary journal, Pratisthan, and for the Post-Colonial Journal of India.

== Bibliography ==
Poetry collections

- (1980) Digant
- (1985) Tarihee
- (1992) Divasendivas
- (2005) Waaluchya Paatrat Manndalela Khel
- (2012) Darasal
- (2017) Kadachit Ajoonahi ISBN 9-789-38236-4757

Other writing

- Navsala Pavali Doctorin (stories)
