= Madhukar Vasudev Dhond =

Literary and art critic

Madhukar Vasudev Dhond (M. V. Dhond) (3 October 1914 – 5 December 2007) was a literary and art critic from Maharashtra, India.

== Works ==
He wrote in Marathi on Dnyaneshwar, Namdev, Tukaram, Ramdas, Vitthal, Raghunath Dhondo Karve, Ram Ganesh Gadkari, Bal Sitaram Mardhekar, Dattatraya Ganesh Godse, Anandi Gopal Joshi, Ranjit Desai's novel Swami, Vijay Tendulkar's play Sakharam Binder, and many other topics.

Dhond received in 1997 a Sahitya Akademi Award for his book Jnaneshwaritil Laukik Srushti.

== Authorship ==
- The Evolution of Khyāl
- Aisa Witevara Dewa Kothe! (Rajhans Prakashan, 2001)
- Tarīhi Yeto Wasa Phulānnā (Rajhans Prakashan, 1999)
- Jalyatil Chandra (Rajhans Prakashan. 1994)
- Jnaneshwaritil Laukik Srishti (Mauj Prakashan, 1991)
- Chandra Chavathicha (Mauj Prakashan, 1987)
- Dnyaneshwari: Swarup, Tatvadnyan Ani Kavya (Majestic Book Stall, 1980)
- Marathi Lavani (Mauj Prakashan, 1956)
