= Maruti Chitampalli =

Indian writer (1932–2025)

Maruti Bhujangrao Chitampalli
- Born: 5 November 1932; India
- Died: 18 June 2025 (aged 92); Solapur, Maharashtra, India
- Occupations: Naturalist; wildlife conservationist; author
- Awards: Padma Shri (2025)

Maruti Bhujangrao Chitampalli (5 November 1932 – 18 June 2025) was an Indian naturalist, wildlife conservationist and Marathi writer from Maharashtra, India.

== Life and career ==
Although official records list his birth date as 5 November, Chitampalli himself mentioned 12 November 1932 as his birth date in his autobiography Chakva Chandan. He spent his childhood in Solapur, now in Maharashtra, and later attended the State Forest Service College in Coimbatore.

Chitampalli began his career with the Maharashtra State government's Forest Service. During his tenure, he worked across various forests and national parks in Maharashtra. His experiences in the field provided the foundation for his literary works, primarily written in Marathi.

He retired from service as Deputy Chief Conservator of Forests in Maharashtra. Chitampalli significantly contributed to the development of wildlife sanctuaries and national parks such as Karnala Bird Sanctuary, Navegaon National Park, Nagzira Wildlife Sanctuary, and Melghat Tiger Reserve. He also facilitated the creation of orphanages for displaced wildlife at Nagzira and Melghat.

Chitampalli learned writing skills under the guidance of renowned Marathi writer Gopal Nilkanth Dandekar. In recognition of his literary contributions, he presided over the Marathi Sahitya Sammelan at Solapur in 2006.

Chitampalli died in Solapur, Maharashtra on 18 June 2025, at the age of 92.

== Awards ==
In January 2025, he was honoured with the Padma Shri, India's fourth-highest civilian award, by the Government of India.

In 2017, he received the Vinda Karandikar Memorial Lifetime Achievement Award from the Government of Maharashtra.

In 2018, he received Kirloskar Vasundhara's Lifetime Achievement Award at Pune. Also, he was the Chairman of the Kirloskar Vasundhara Green Literature Meet for 2018–19 at Pune. (किर्लोस्कर वसुंधरा पर्यावरणस्नेही साहित्य संमेलन)

== Literary work ==
The following are some of Chitampalli's works:

- Ratawa (रातवा)
- Ranvata (रानवाटा)
- Nilawanti (निळावंती)
- Pranikosh (प्राणीकोश)
- Pakshikosh (पक्षीकोश)
- Suwarna Garud (सुवर्ण गरुड)
- Nisargawachan ( निसर्गवाचन)
- Shabdanche Dhan (शब्दांचे धन)
- Jangalache Dene (जंगलाचं देणं)
- Mrugpakshishastra (मृगपक्षीशास्त्र)
- Kesharacha Paus (केशराचा पाऊस)
- Gharatya Palikade (घरट्या पलिकडे)
- Anandadayi Bagale (आनंददायी बगळे)
- Pakshi Jaya Digantara (पक्षी जाय दिगंतरा)
- Chitragriwa: Eka Kabutarachi Katha (चित्रग्रीव : एका कबुतराची कथा)
- Navegavbandhache diwas: (नवेगाव बांधचे दिवस)
- Chaitrapalawi: 2004
- Chakva Chandan : Ek Vanopanishad (चकवा चांदण : एक वनोपनिषद) (Autobiography)
- An Introduction to Mrugpakshishastra of Hansadev (in English)
