= Raosaheb Rangnath Borade =

Indian Marathi author (1940–2025)

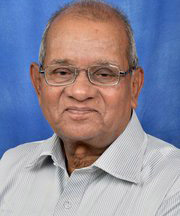
- Born: 25 December 1940; Katgaon, Latur district, Maharashtra
- Died: 11 February 2025 (aged 84); Chhatrapati Sambhajinagar, Maharashtra
- Language: Marathi
- Notable works: Pachola
- Notable awards: Vinda Karandikar Jeevan Gaurav Puraskar (2024)

Raosaheb Rangnath Borade (25 December 1940 – 11 February 2025) was an Indian Marathi author. A writer known mostly for his rural themes, he first came to attention with his first novel Pachola (Fallen foliage). Published in the 1970s, Pachola was translated into English and Hindi. His other prominent works include Aamdar Saubhagyawati, Taalmel, Malni, Naatigoti, and Kholamba among many others.

== Early life ==
Borade was born at Katgaon village in Latur district of Maharashtra on 25 December 1940. Initially, he taught Marathi as a teacher and later worked as a principal at a local college in Vaijapur. He has penned 12 novels, 15 collections of short stories, and 15 plays.

In 2024, Borade was awarded the Vinda Karandikar Jeevan Gaurav Puraskar, a lifetime achievement award for his contributions to Marathi literature. Borade died on 11 February 2025, at the age of 84.
