= Vijaya Rajadhyaksha =

Indian writer

- Born: 1933
- Occupation: Writer
- Spouse: M. V. Rajadhyaksha (m. 1970–2010)

Vijaya Rajadhyaksha (born 1933) is a Marathi writer from Maharashtra, India.

She studied at Rajaram College in Kolhapur, and obtained her doctorate from Mumbai University.

Rajadhyaksha taught Marathi literature at Elphinstone College affiliated with Mumbai University, and then served as the head of Marathi department in SNDT Women's University, also in Mumbai.

Her husband M. V. Rajadhyaksha (1913-2010) was also a noted Marathi writer.

== Literary work ==
Her book मर्ढेकरांची कविता : स्वरूप आणि संदर्भ received a Sahitya Akademi Award in 1993. She presided over Marathi Sahitya Sammelan at Indore in 2001. Recently, she was awarded first Vinda Karandikar Jeevan Gaurav Puraskar (2010) which carries a prize money of Rs 1,00,000/- and an honorary certificate.

=== Critiques ===
- मर्ढेकरांची कविता : स्वरूप आणि संदर्भ
- पुन्हा मर्ढेकर
- शोध मर्ढेकरांचा
- प्रभाकर पाध्ये: वाङ्मयदर्शन
- मराठी कादंबरी आस्वाद यात्रा
- वेचक - विजया राजाध्यक्ष
- वेध कवितेचा
- वाङ्मयीन पत्रव्यवहार
- बहुपेडी विंदा (चरित्र-आत्मचरित्र समीक्षा)
- बहुपेडी विंदा खंड २ (दलित साहित्य समीक्षा)
- किती वाटा किती वळणं (कादंबरी समीक्षा)
- काही वाटा काही वळण (ललितलेखन समीक्षा)
- आहे मनोहर तरी ... वाचन आणि विवेचन (संपादकः विजया राजाध्यक्ष आणि श्री. पु. भागवत)

=== Collections of short stories ===
- दोनच रंग
- जास्वंद
- अनोळखी
- हुंकार
- पांगारा
- चैतन्याचे ऊन
- समांतर कथा
- अन्वयार्थ
- कमान
- आधी नंतर

=== Collections of essays ===
- अनुबंध
- तळ्यात...मळ्यात

=== Novel ===
- उत्तरार्ध

=== Play ===
- जानकी देसाईचे प्रश्न

=== Literature for children ===
- कदंब

=== Edited collections of works of Marathi poets ===
- आदिमाया (सहसंपादक: विंदा करंदीकर)

=== Other works ===
- प्रबंधसार
- मराठी वाडमयकोश खंड चौथा
- साहित्य: अध्यापन आणि प्रकार
