= M. V. Rajadhyaksha =

Mangesh Vitthal Rajadhyaksha (7 June 1913 – 19 April 2010) was a Marathi writer and critic. He studied at Elphinstone College in Mumbai, where he won the prestigious Wordsworth Prize for the best student in English literature.

Rajadhyaksha later taught English literature at Elphinstone College, Gujarat College (Ahmedabad) and Rajaram College (Kolhapur). He also served on several prestigious committees, including the National Book Trust and the Jnanpith Trust that gives the Jnanpith Award.

He was closely involved with Abhiruchi, a Marathi literary journal that was the launching pad for some of the greatest writers in the post-independence era.

The Times of India reported at the time of his death: "His essays, collected in seven volumes, brought to Marathi literary criticism a rare perspicacity, candour and impatience with cant. His style was economical, precise and always lined with irony. He also coauthored a seminal history of Marathi literature with Kusumavati Deshpande. Panch Kavi, (पाच कवी) a selection of the works of five poets who represented the new and modern in poetry at the turn of the 19th century, became a literary classic. His preface to the volume remains one of the most lucidly argued pieces of literary criticism."

The Marathi daily Loksatta, in an editorial, described his death as the death of a पुराणपुरुष, and one who was a scholar in the English critical tradition as well as a Marathi intellectual.

He was the husband of the well-known Marathi writer Vijaya Rajadhyaksha.

He died on 19 April 2010 at the age of 96.

== Books ==
1. पाच कवी (संपादित, 1946)
2. आकाश्भाशिते (1963)
3. खर्डेघाशी (1963)
4. अम्लान (1983)
5. शालजोडी (1983)
6. पंचम (1984)
7. पाक्षिकी (1986)
8. शब्दयात्रा (1986)
9. पुरुषराज अळूरपांडे (with P.L. Deshpande and R.V. Alurkar, 1988)
10. A History of Marathi Literature (with Kusumavati Deshpande, 1988)
11. भाषाविवेक (1997)
12. स्मरणसावल्या (2001)
13. वाद संवाद (with Dattatraya Ganesh Godse, 2003)

== Essays ==
- "Professor R. P. Kangle", Quelle: Perceptions on Kautilîya Artha´sâstra : in commemoration of Prof. R. P. Kangle's birth centenary, ed. K. P. Jog. Mumbai: Popular Prakashan, 1999. ISBN 978-81-7154-652-7. 207 – 216
- M.V. Rajadhakshya, "Shakespeare in Marathi", Indian Literature, Sahitya Akademi, Delhi, vol.7 no.1 (1974), p. 83
- "Marathi Literature from A. D. 1800 to A. D. 1920". Maharashtra State Gazetteers, Government of Maharashtra Language and Literature

== Translations ==
- Pendse, Shripad Narayan, The B.E.S.T. story, S. N. Pendsay; rendered into English from the Marathi by M. V. Rajadhyaksha, Bombay Electric Supply & Transport Undertaking, Bombay: 1972
