= Vinda Karandikar Jeevan Gaurav Puraskar =

Indian award for Marathi literature

Vinda Jeevan Gaurav Puraskar is a lifetime achievement award conferred annually by the Department of Marathi Language, Government of Maharashtra. It is given to a writer who has made a lasting and valuable contribution to Marathi literature.originally consisted of a citation and a cash award of ₹5 lakh (US$5,200). It is named in honour of Marathi poet Govind Vinayak Karandikar.

== Description ==
The awards consists of a citation, memento and a cash award of ₹5 lakh (US$5,200).

== List of awardees ==
Year	Awardee	References
2010	Vijaya Rajadhyaksha	
2011	Keshav Jagannath Purohit	
2012	Namdeo Dhondo Mahanor	
2013	Vasant Abaji Dahake	
2014	Dattaram Maruti Mirasdar	
2015	R. G. Jadhav	
2016	Maruti Chitampalli	
2017	Madhu Mangesh Karnik	
2018	Mahesh Elkunchwar	
2019	Anuradha Patil	
2020	Raṅganatha Paṭhare	
2021	Bharat Sasane	
2022	Chandrakumar Nalage	
2023	Ravindra Shobhane	
2024	Raosaheb Rangnath Borade	
