= Thomas Daniell =

English landscape painter (1749–1840)

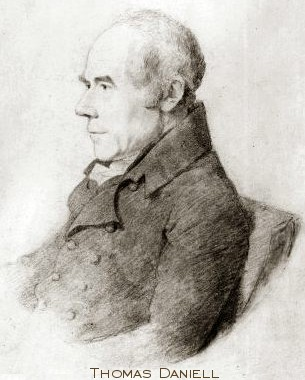
- Portrait of Thomas Daniell, date unknown
- Born: 1749; Kingston upon Thames, Surrey, England
- Died: 19 March 1840 (aged 90–91); Earls Terrace, Kensington, England
- Education: Queen Street, London; Royal Academy
- Known for: Painter, author, illustrator
- Movement: Orientalist

Thomas Daniell RA (1749 – 19 March 1840) was an English landscape painter who also painted Orientalist themes. He spent seven years in India, accompanied by his nephew William, also an artist, and published several series of aquatints of the country.

== Early life ==
Thomas Daniell was born in 1749 in Kingston upon Thames, Surrey. His father was the landlord of the Swan Inn at Chertsey (where he was later succeeded by Thomas' elder brother William and his wife Sarah). Thomas began his career apprenticed to an heraldic painter and worked at Maxwell's the coach painter in Queen Street before attending the Royal Academy Schools. Although he exhibited 30 works – mainly landscapes and floral pieces – at the Academy between 1772 and 1784, Daniell found it difficult to establish himself as a landscape painter in Britain. Like many other Europeans at that time, Daniell was drawn to India by stories of the wealth and fame that awaited travellers to the newly accessible East, and in 1784 he obtained permission from the East India Company to travel to Calcutta to work as an engraver, accompanied by his nephew, William Daniell, as his assistant.

== India ==
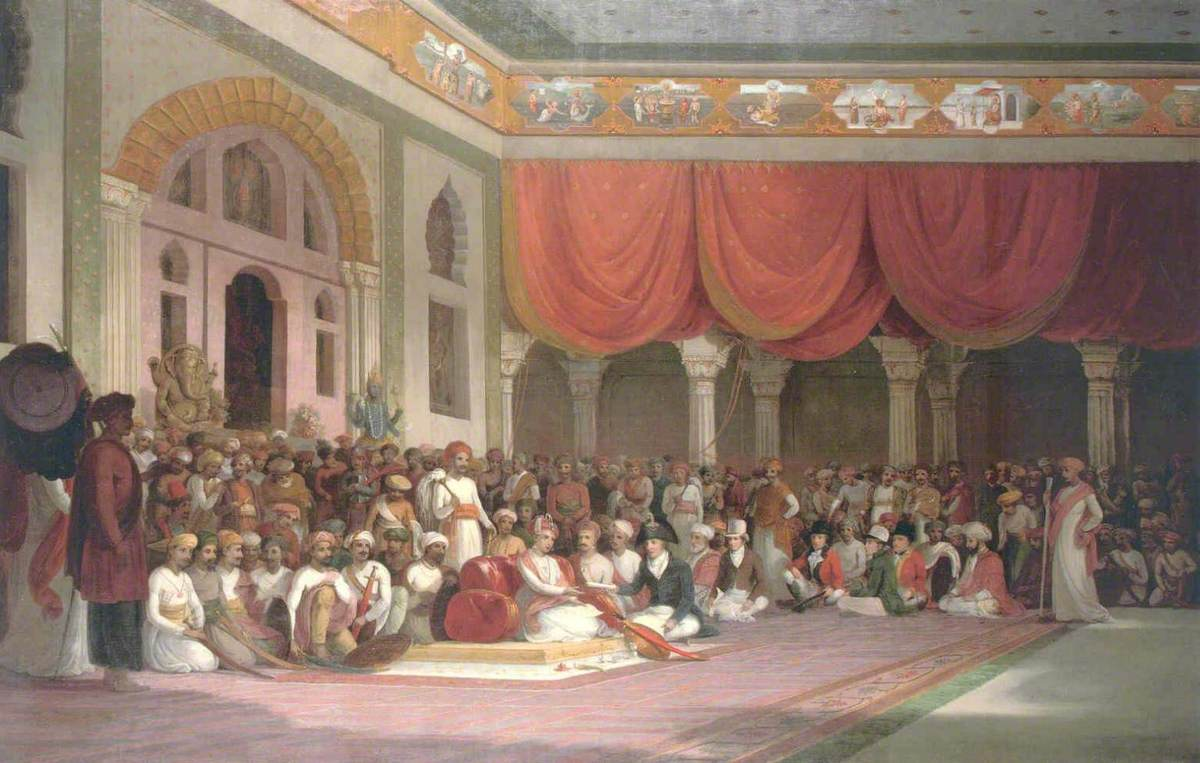
Sir Charles Warre Malet, Concluding a Treaty in 1790 in Durbar with the Peshwa of the Maratha Empire (1805)

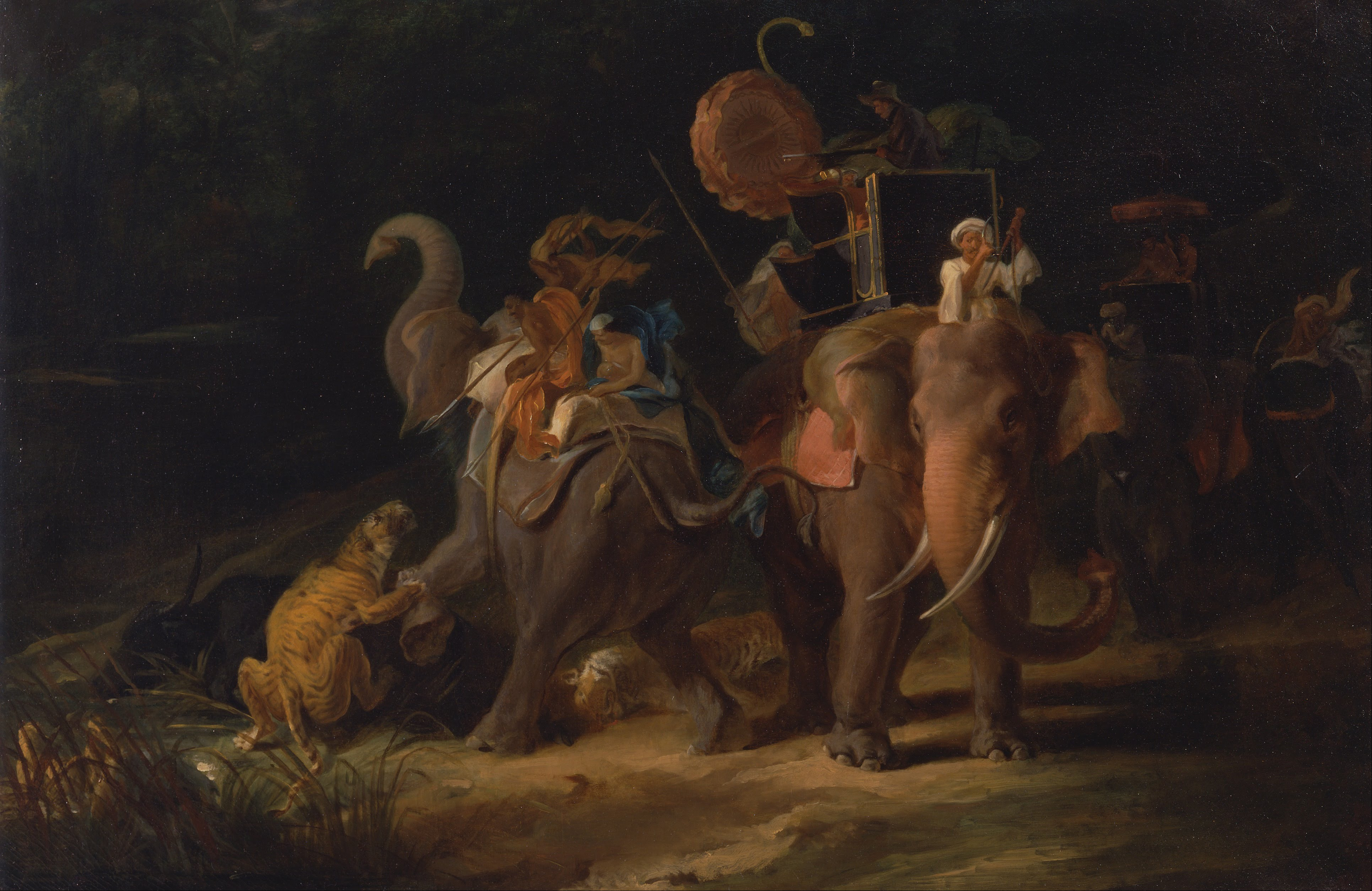
Thomas Daniell - Tiger Hunting in the East Indies, 1798

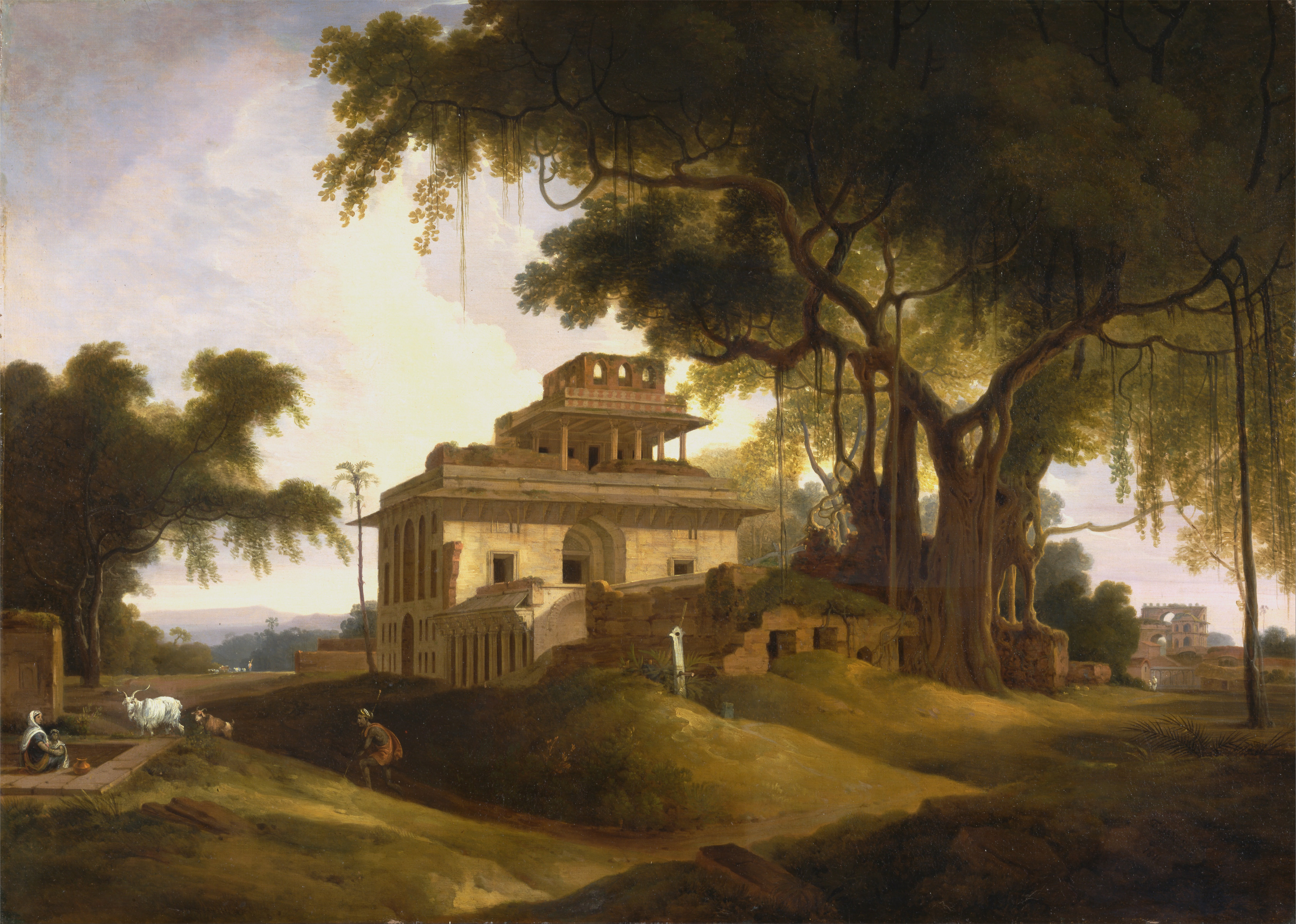
Thomas Daniell - Ruins of the Naurattan, Sasaram, Bihar, 1811

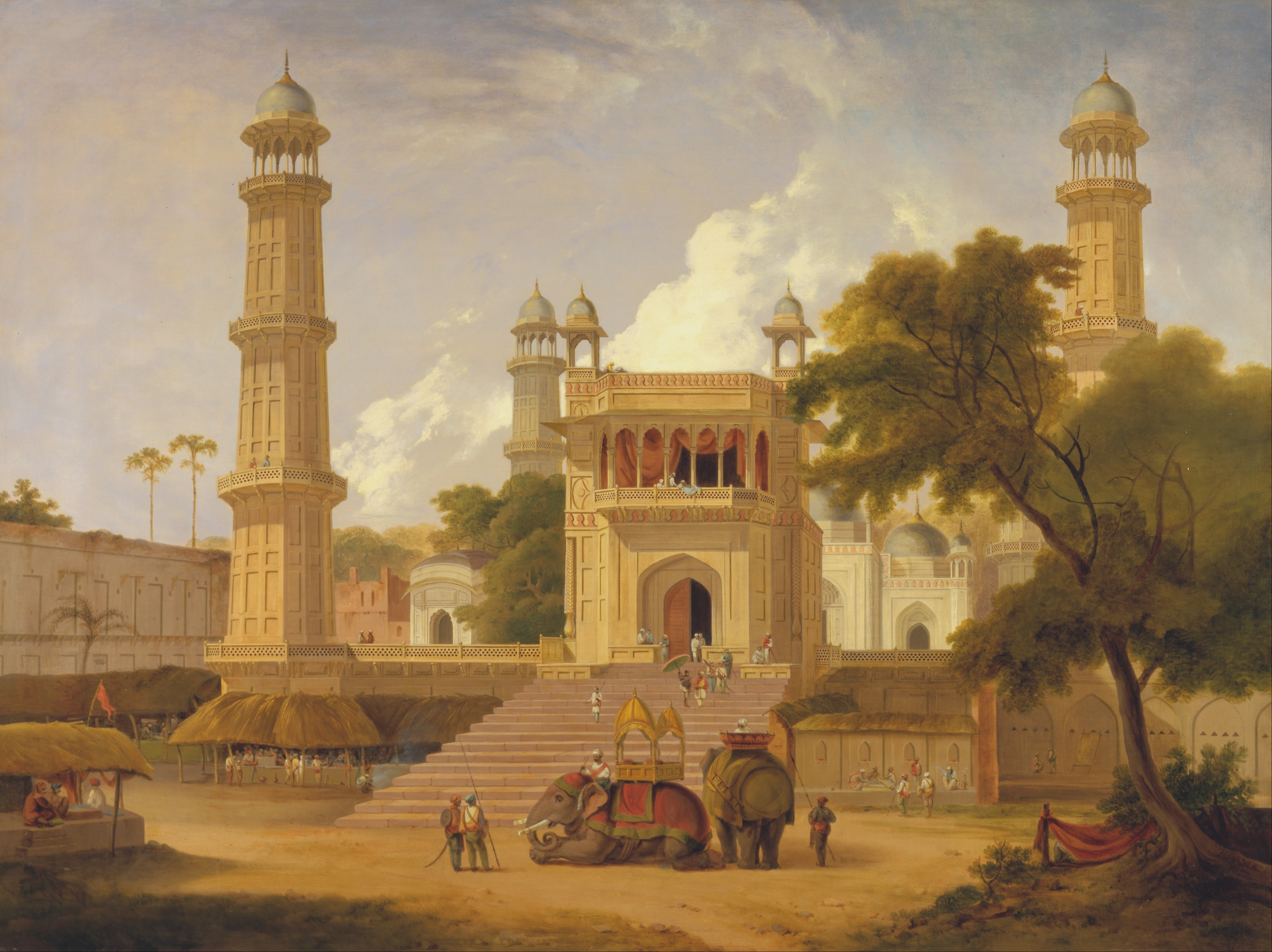
Thomas Daniell - Indian Temple, Said to Be the Mosque of Abo-ul-Nabi, Muttra, 1827

Thomas and William Daniell sailed from Gravesend on 7 April 1785, arriving in Calcutta via Whampoa in China early in 1786. In July of that year, Daniell announced, in an advertisement in the Calcutta Chronicle, his intention to publish a set of views of the city. Executed in etching and aquatint and hand-coloured by local painters, the twelve plates were completed in late 1788. In November of that year Daniell wrote to Ozias Humphrey "I was obliged to stand Painter Engraver Copper-smith Printer and Printers Devil myself. It was a devilish undertaking but I was determined to see it through at all events."

On 3 September 1788, the Daniells set out on a tour of north-west India leaving Calcutta by boat along the River Ganges, travelling as far as Srinagar (in the District of Garwhal, Uttrakhand), where they arrived in May 1789. Thomas and his nephew spent 1790 and 1791 in the town of Bhagalpur (now in the Indian state of Bihar) with the orientalist and amateur artist Samuel Davis, whom Thomas had first met during his apprenticeship in London. They made many stops on their return journey, not arriving back in Calcutta until February 1792. In April 1789, Daniell and his nephew travelled northward from Kanpur to Delhi, enchanted by Mughal architecture. They then explored the mountains of Garhwal, becoming among the first Europeans to visit and document the region through their artwork.

On 10 March 1792 the Daniells left Calcutta once more, this time for Madras (now Chennai), reaching it on the 29th of the same month. They left Madras after only 11 days, having hired the services of a considerable retinue, including two palanquins and their bearers, taking a route which more or less followed that of the British army which had defeated Tipu Sultan the previous year. They were back in Madras in January 1793. A briefer third tour took them through western India. They left Madras in the middle of February 1793 and reached Bombay the following month. In May 1793 the Daniells left India and returned to England, reaching home in September 1794.

== Return to England ==
On his return to England, Daniell set about publishing an extensive illustrated work under the general heading title of "Oriental Scenery". Six volumes, published between 1795 and 1808, were based on drawings made in India by the Daniells themselves; another consisted of plates of the caves at Ellora after drawings by James Wales. There were 144 plates in total including a set published as Twenty-four landscapes, views in Hindoostan drawn and engraved by Thomas and William Daniell, with permission respectfully dedicated to the Rt.Hon. George O'Brien, Earl of Egremont, first published on 1 January 1804.

The Daniells also published Views in Egypt (1808–9) and Picturesque Voyage to India, by Way of China (1810). They etched all the plates themselves, almost all in aquatint. Daniell continued to exhibit Eastern subjects until 1828. He also contributed drawings to Rees's Cyclopædia, but these have not been identified.

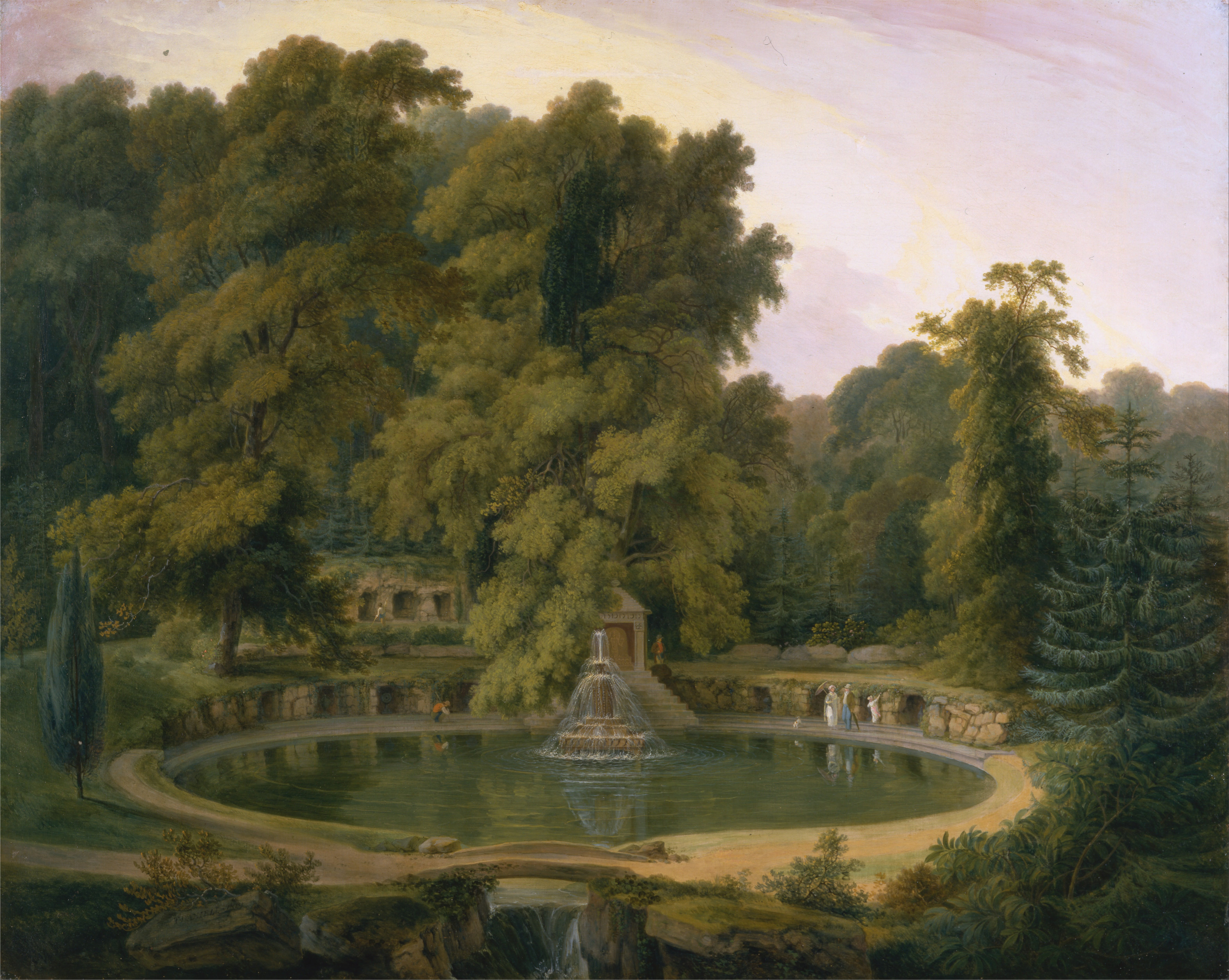
Thomas Daniell - Temple, Fountain and Cave in Sezincote Park

He contributed to some landscaping projects, designing an Indian temple for Sir John Osborne at Melchet Court, and various garden buildings for Sir Charles Cockerell's Sezincote. His paintings of Sezincote are rare exceptions to the Indian subjects which comprise almost his complete output after his return to England He was elected a Royal Academician in 1790, and a fellow of the Royal Society of Arts at around the same time.

Daniell never married. He died at his home in Earls Terrace, Kensington, on 19 March 1840, aged 91, having outlived both his nephews. He is buried at Kensal Green Cemetery.

== Gallery ==
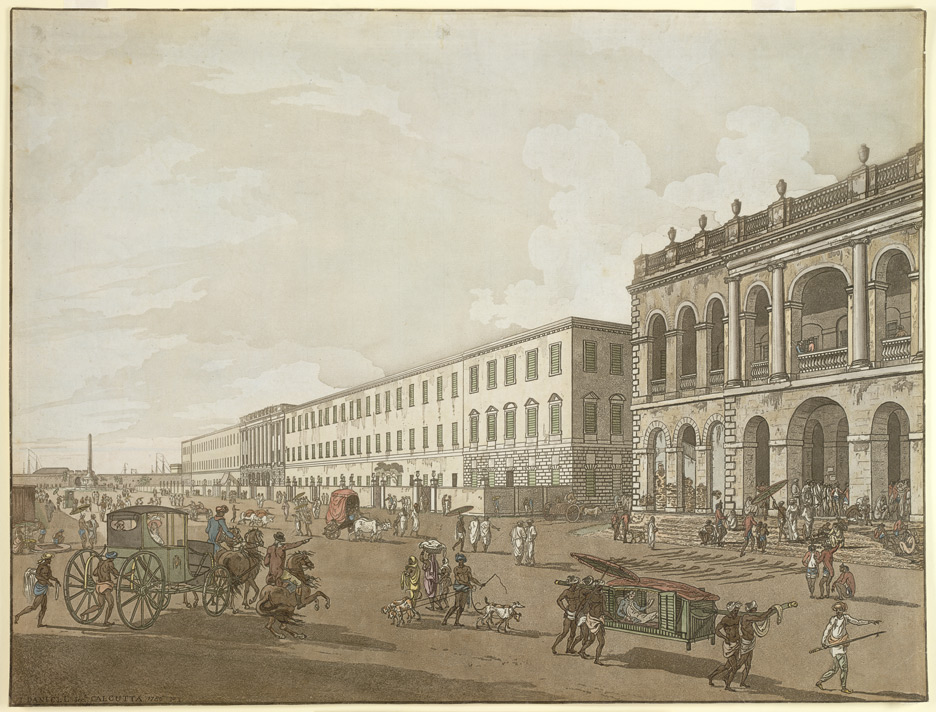
Old Court House and Writers' Building, Calcutta (1786)

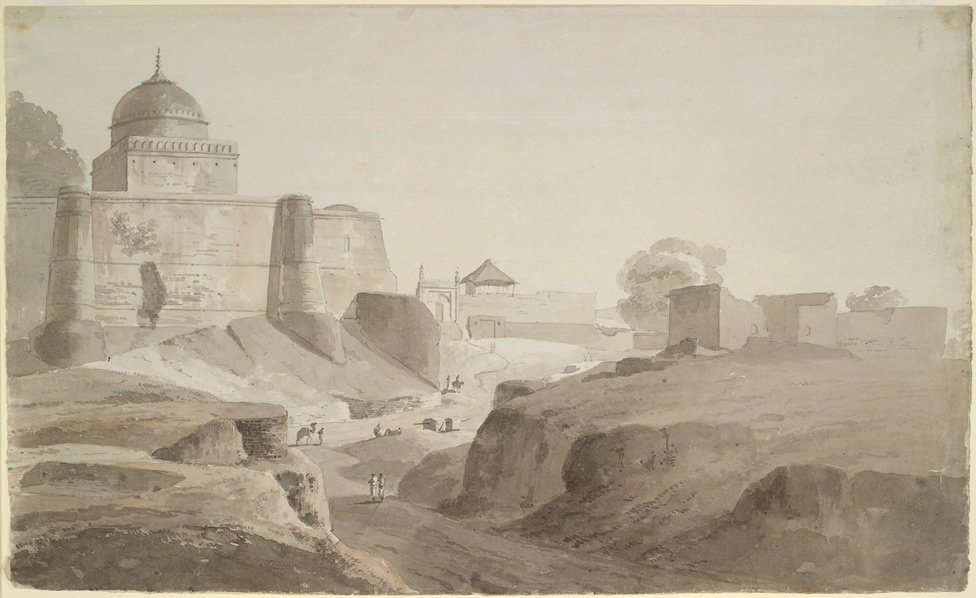
Sambhal Jama Masjid, wash drawing by Thomas Daniell & William Daniell, 1789

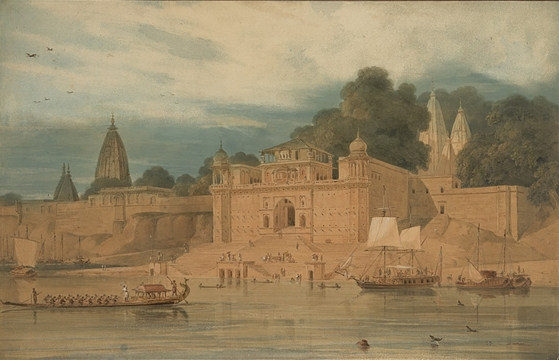
Shivala Ghat, Benares, 1789

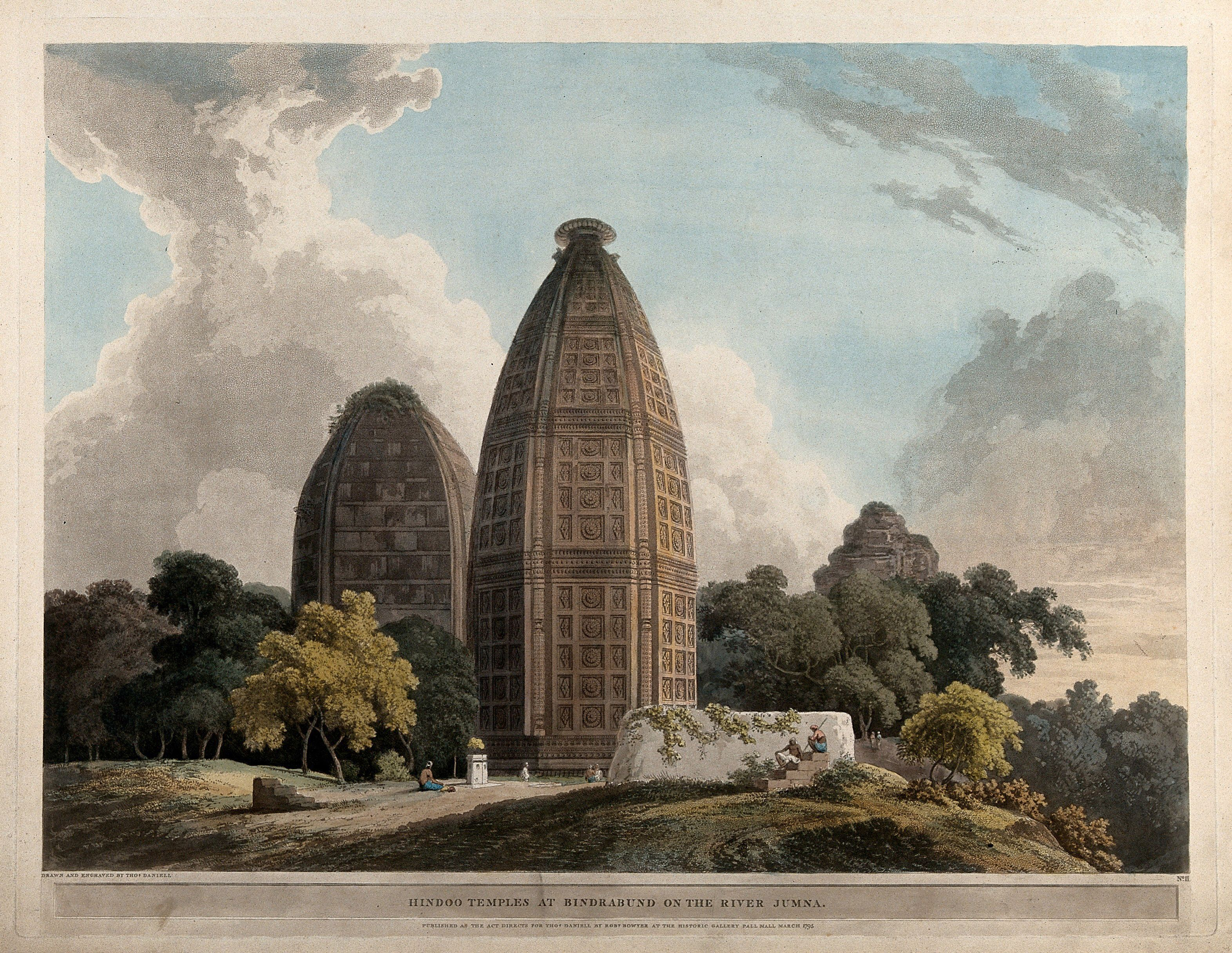
Hindu temples on the river at Jumna, India, 1795

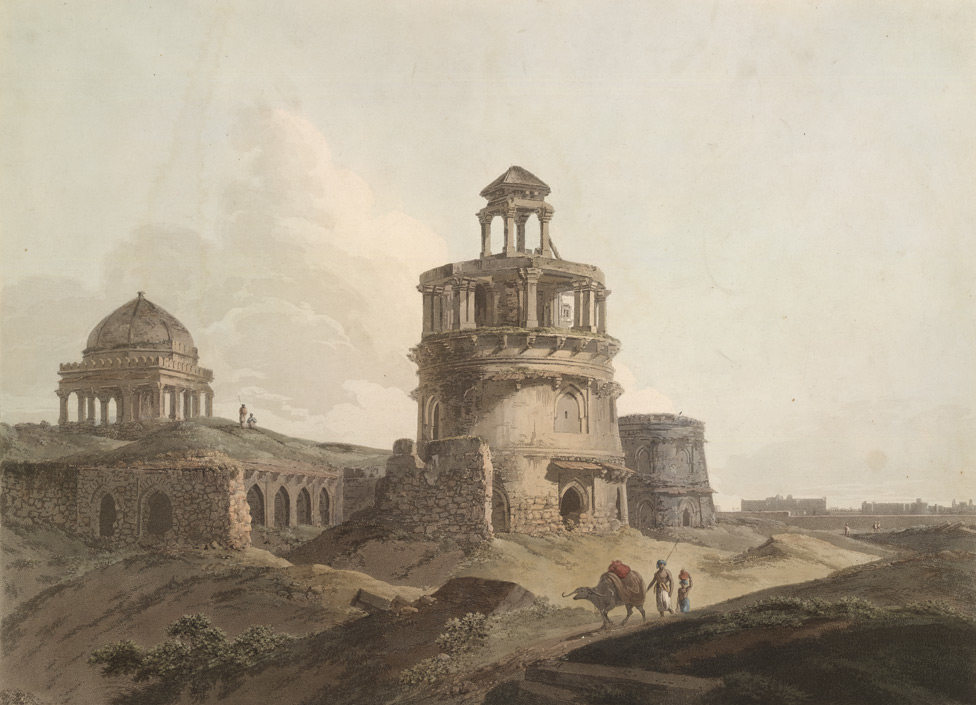
Feroz Shah Kotla remains, Delhi, Aquatint, 1795, later reproduced on a Staffordshire earthenware dish c. 1810–20

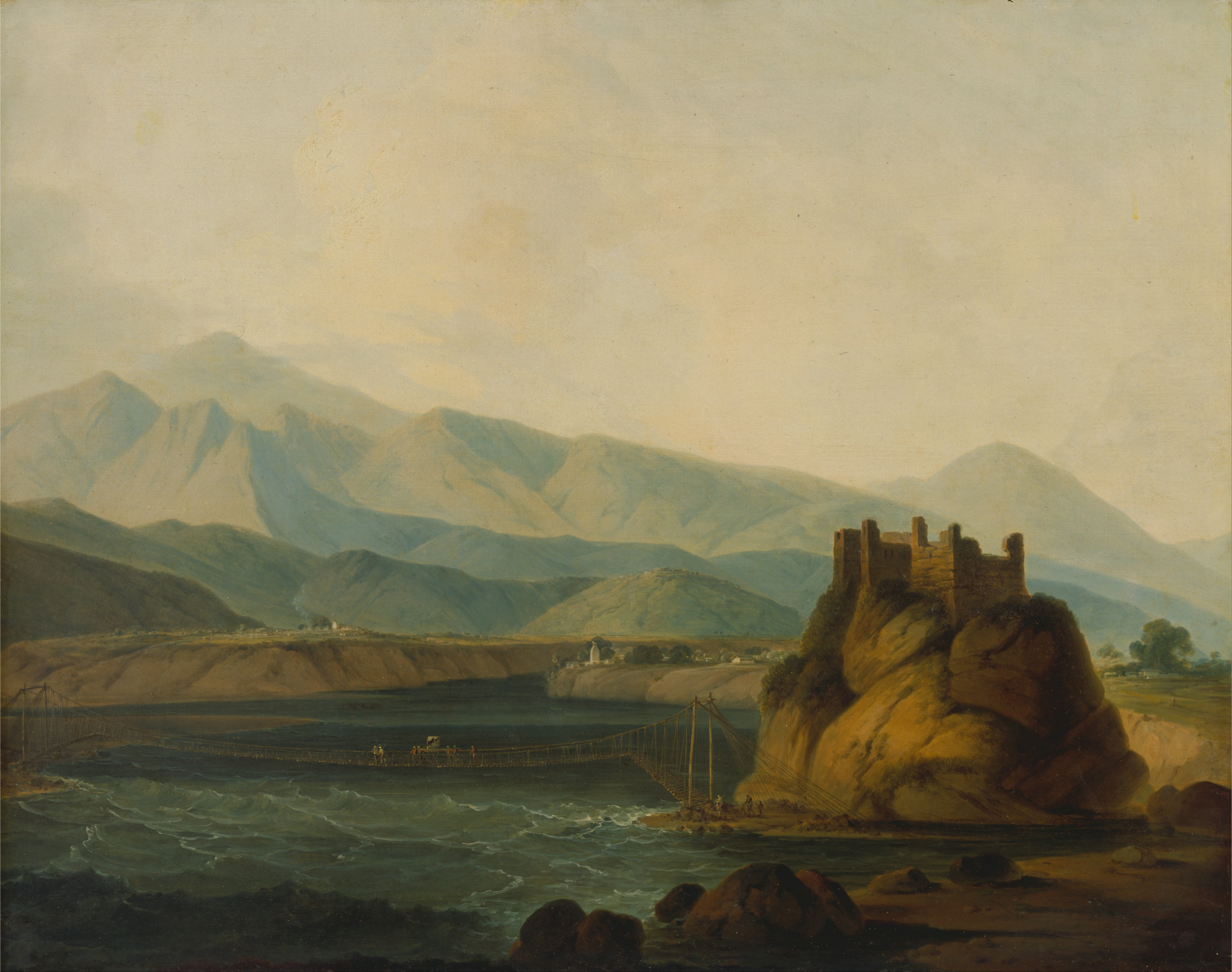
The Rope Bridge at Serinagur, c. 1800

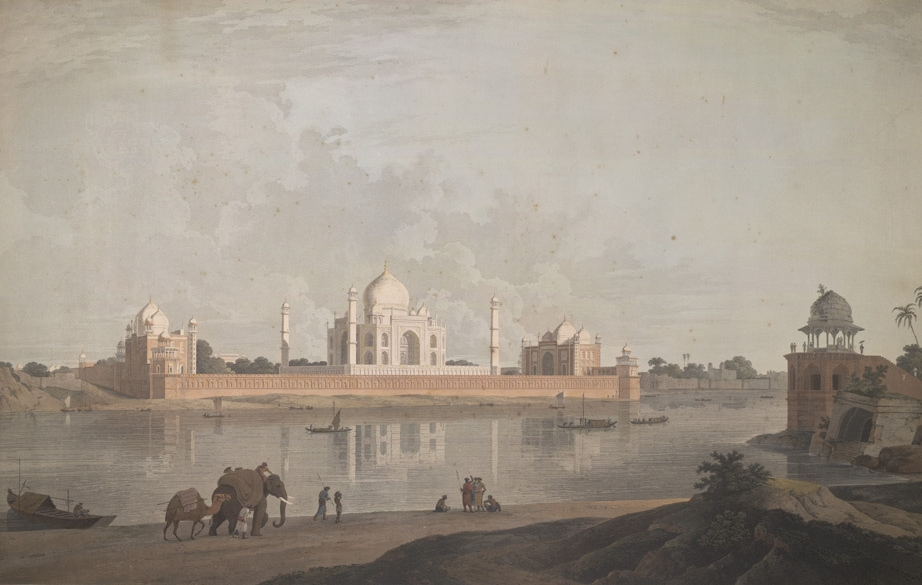
Taj Mahal, 1801

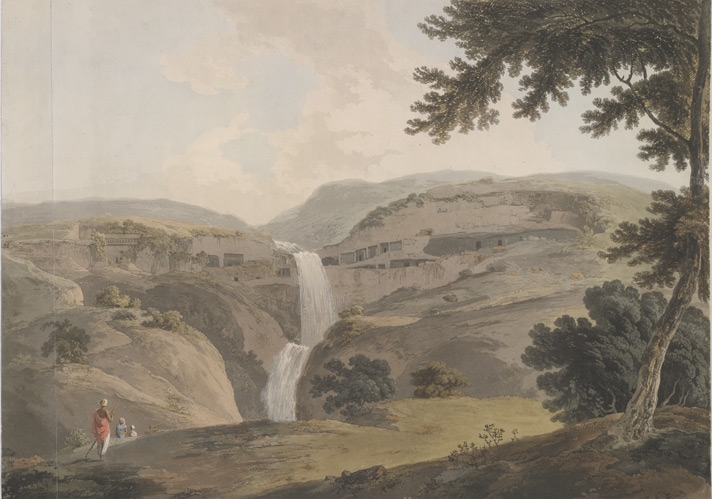
Mountain of Ellora, 1803

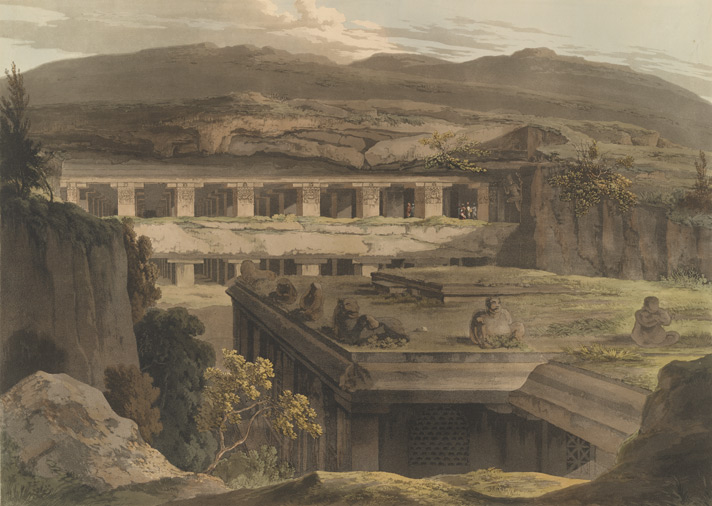
Dasavatara cave, Ellora, 1803

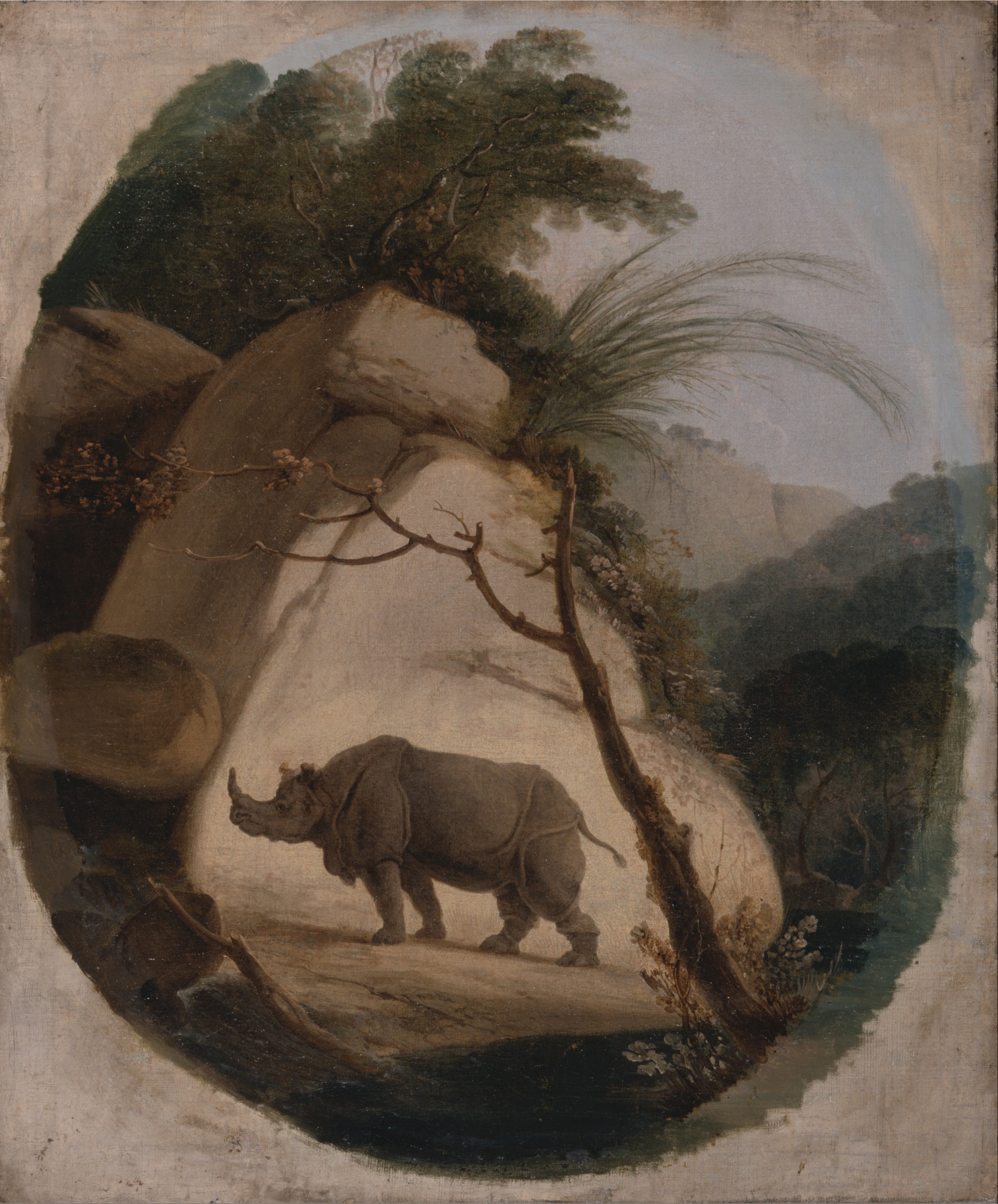
The Indian Rhinoceros

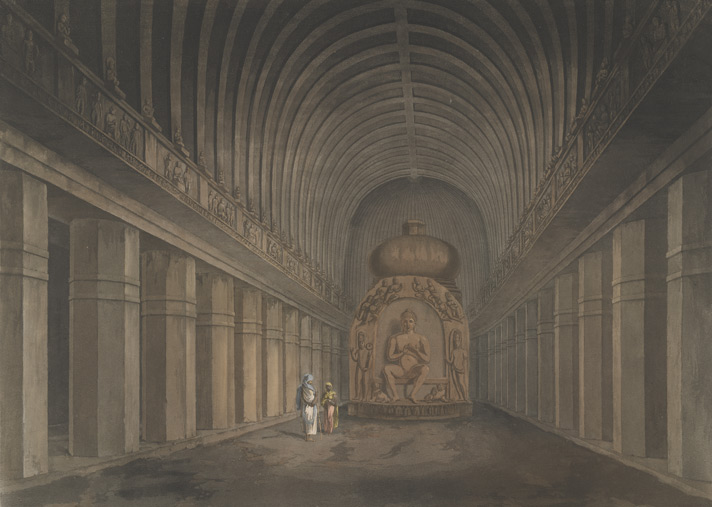
Viswakarma, Ellora, a chaitya worship hall built around 650 CE, by Thomas Daniell and James Wales, 1803

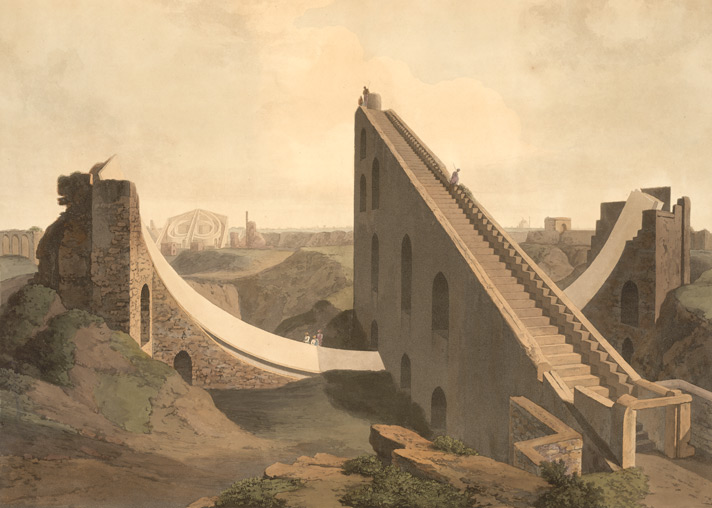
The Observatory at Delhi, 1808

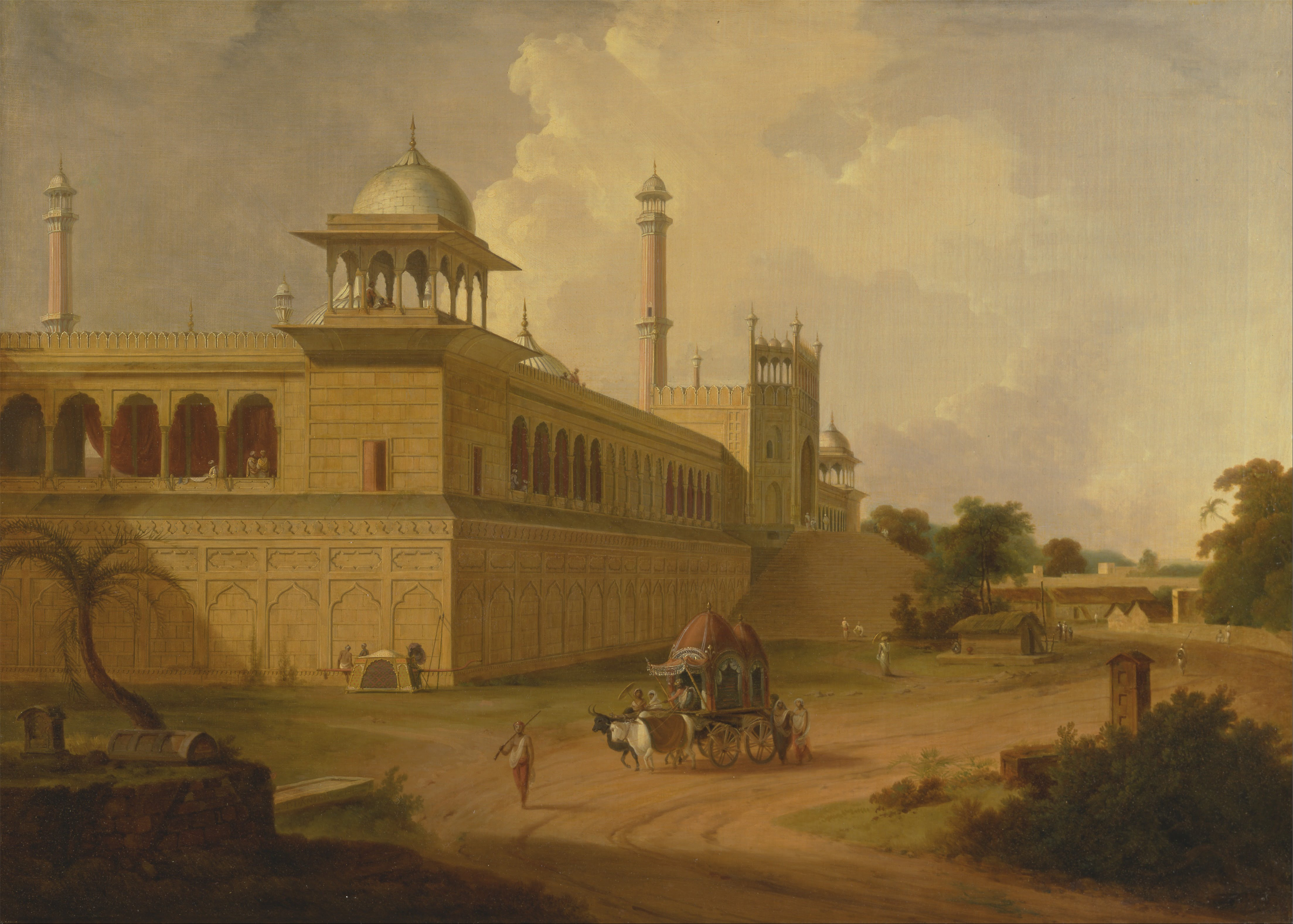
Jami Masjid, Delhi, 1811

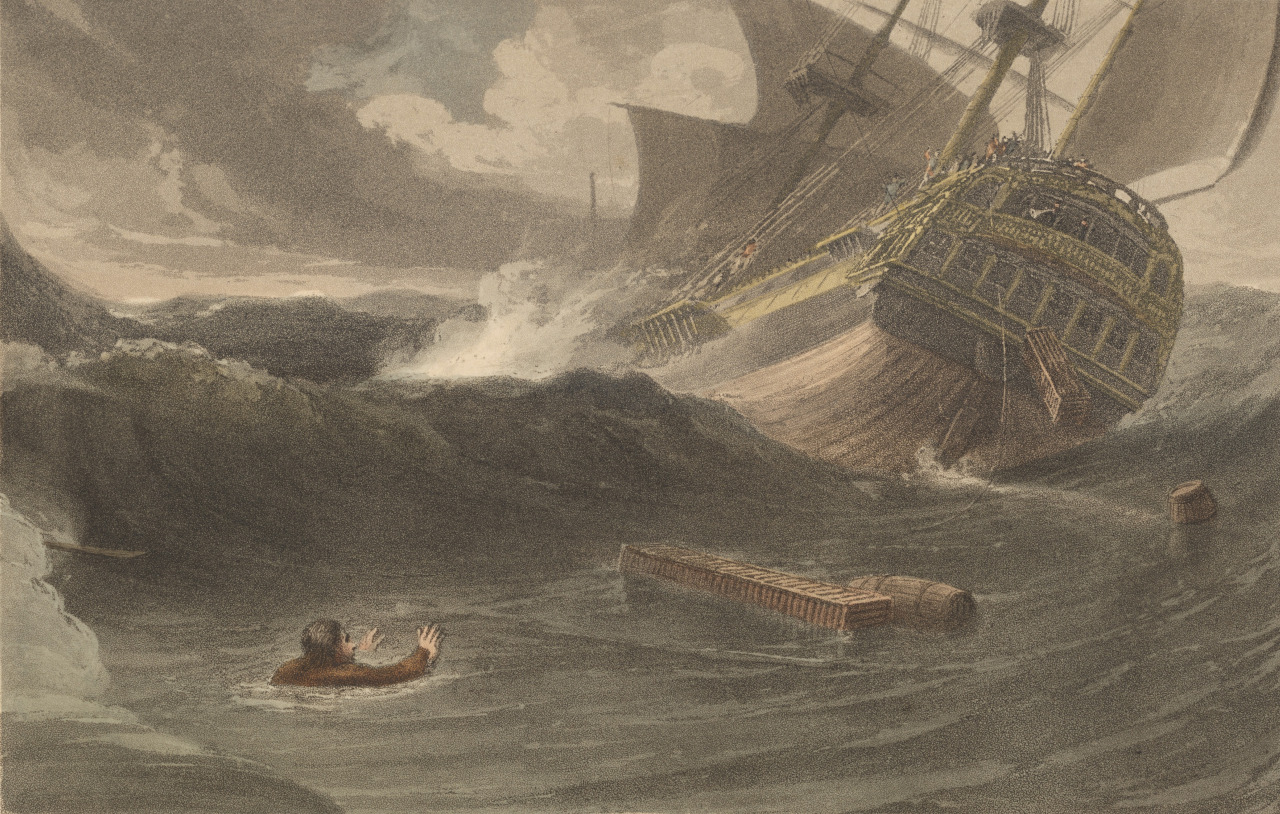
A man overboard. Drawing by Thomas Daniell & William Daniell, 1810

== See also ==
- List of Orientalist artists
- Orientalism
- James Forbes (artist)

== Sources ==
- Davis, Samuel; Aris, Michael (1982). Views of Medieval Bhutan: the diary and drawings of Samuel Davis, 1783. Serindia.
