= Sir Parashurambhau College =

Private college in India

Coordinates: 18.507402°N 73.849693°E

Sir Parashurambhau College (Autonomous), Pune
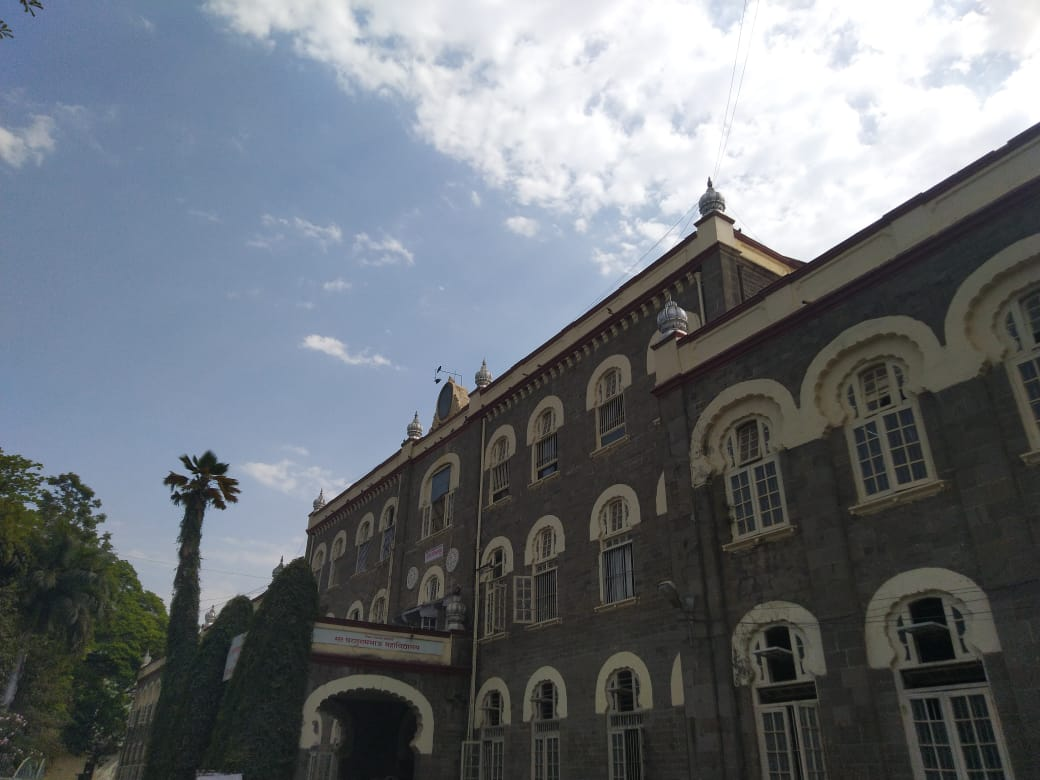
- Former name: New Poona College
- Motto: "निर्वाहः प्रतिपन्न वस्तुषु"
- Type: Public
- Established: 1916
- Affiliations: Savitribai Phule Pune University Maharashtra State Board of Secondary and Higher Secondary Education
- Principal: Prof. DR.Avinash Moharil.
- Vice Principals: Prof. Vidya Avachat (Arts) Prof. Pravin Ranasure (Commerce) Prof. Sunita Jadhav (Science)
- Location: Tilak Road, Sadashiv Peth, Pune, Maharashtra, 411030, India
- Campus: 25 acres (10 ha)
- Website: www.spcollegepune.ac.in
- Publication: Parashuramiya University ID No.: PU/PN/ASC/003/1916 Accreditation: NAAC accredited A+ grade 3.70 points (on 4 point scale) Administration: Shikshan Prasarak Mandali, Pune

Sir Parashurambhau College (S.P. College) is an Autonomous (since 2019) college in Pune, Maharashtra, India. Established in 1916 as New Poona College at the hands of the British Governor Lord Willingdon, the college was renamed as Sir Parashurambhau College as a mark of gratitude towards the then ruler of Jamkhandi State who donated ₹2,00,000 in the memory of his father, Parashurambhau Patwardhan. The college is governed by Shikshan Prasarak Mandali, a private education society in Maharashtra.

== Academics ==
- Arts
- Science
- Commerce
- Interdisciplinary Sciences
- Computer Science (B.C.S. Course started in 1987)
- Electronics Science (B.Sc Course Started in 1985)
- Business Administration
- Skill development center

== Educational offering ==
Sir Parashurambhau College offers education from junior college (grade 11–12) to postgraduate (Masters) level. The highschool is known as the Junior College. India follows a 10+2 education system with students electing one out of three fields of specialization, namely Science, Arts and Commerce (Business) in grades 11–12. The junior college enrolls about 3800 students, out of which about 1600 students are of the Science stream in standards 11–12. There are 7 divisions per grade (for the Science stream) from A through G. The college, which was established in 1916 with humble origins, now has a campus spanning 25 acres (0.04 sq miles) with sprawling grounds, heritage buildings, botanical gardens and a swimming pool. Sir Parashurambhau College is affiliated to the Maharashtra State Board of Secondary and Higher Secondary Education (MSBSHSE). Students appear for the HSC examination for matriculation from the school. Although an independent school, the SP Junior College receives periodic financial grants from the Maharashtra State Government.

=== Curriculum ===
Students of the Science stream take compulsory courses in the following subjects: English, Physics, Chemistry, Environmental Science, Physical Education. They can opt for 2 or 3 of the following subjects: Mathematics, Biology, Marathi, German, Hindi, Geography, Computer Science and Application, Scooter and Motorcycle Servicing, Electronics, Electrical Maintenance, Mechanical Maintenance. Students of the Arts stream take compulsory courses in the following subjects: English, Marathi or Hindi or German or Sanskrit, Environmental Science, Health and Physical Education. They can opt for 4 of the following subjects: Economics, Mathematics, History, Psychology, Logic, Geography, Political Science, German, Sanskrit, Hindi, Marathi. (Students can select a maximum of 3 languages) Students of the Commerce (Business) stream take compulsory courses in the following subjects: English, Marathi or Hindi or Sanskrit or German, Environmental Science, Physical Education. They can opt for 4 of the following subjects: Economics, Mathematics, Secretarial Practice, Organization of Commerce, Book-keeping and Accountancy. College is for 6.5 hours a day with 9 classes of 40–45 minutes each. Promotion to the next grade is based on a minimum of 35% marks in each subject throughout the academic year. Science students have first-hand laboratory experience once a week in each of their chosen subjects among the following: Physics, Chemistry, Biology, Computer Science, Electronics, Electrical Maintenance, Mechanical Maintenance, Scooter and Motorcycle Servicing.

=== Junior College Gradation System ===
Grades are awarded according to marks (percentage) scored by the students. Grade points (percentage) are awarded on a 100-point scale. There are 4 exams each year, viz. 2 tutorials (unit tests)- one in each semester, 1 terminal exam (at the end of 1 st semester) and 1 annual exam. All of these exams taken throughout the academic year count towards the final score on a 100-point scale or percentage scale. At the end of Grade 12, students appear for board exams, which are statewide public examinations.

== Student Life and Culture ==
=== Activities ===
Students can join various cultural, academic, and social clubs such as: Book Club, Art Circle, 'Vaadsabha':The debating union, ‘Dandekar Adhyasan’, ‘Vangmay Mandal’, Marathi literature club, Dr. Ambedkar Study Circle, Science Association, Commerce Association, Film club, ‘Urmee’, Arts and Culture Club, ‘Calyx’, Trends in arts and sciences magazine, Adventure Club, Toastmasters International club as will as government programs NSS, 3 mah armd sqn NCC, 36 MHA BN NCC Army wing, 3 Mah Naval unit Div no :- vi, etc.

=== Athletics ===
Students can participate in a variety of indigenous and international games such as: kho-kho, kabaddi, hockey, baseball, volleyball, Dodgeball, football (soccer), etc. in district to national level competitions. SP College has official teams participating in competitive sports on an inter-school and intercollegiate level.

=== MAVEN - Gaining the Edge ===
MAVEN is a skill and entrepreneurship development event conducted by SP College on a National level. It is one of the only Corporate Events happening on a college level in the city. Students participate as volunteers and work on the event, right from planning to execution. It is generally scheduled to happen in mid-January every year.

== Notable alumni ==
- Pandurang Sadashiv Sane, Freedom Fighter, Social Activist, Author
- Baburaoji Parkhe 1912 - 1997, paper & pulp industry, writer and philanthropist
- Dr Sarojini Babar 1920 - 2008, MP, MLA, writer and orator
- Anand Modak 1951- 2014, music composer
- Y.K. Sohoni (1911-2003), Professor of French and recipient of Chevalier dans l'Ordre Palmes Académiques from the Government of France.
- Aruna Ramchandra Dhere, Renowned Marathi Author, Poetess
- Shivrampant Damle (1900–1977), Indian educationist
- Kashinath Ghanekar, Actor
- Dattaram Maruti Mirasdar, Author, Professor
- Vasant Bapat, Poet, Author
- Vasant Nagarkar, Freedom Fighter, Indian Police Service, Social Reformer
- Vasant Date, Freedom Fighter
- Shanta Shelke, Author and Poet
- Vasant Tulpule, Freedom Fighter
- V.D. Chitale, Freedom Fighter, Labor Leader
- Shridhar Balwant Tilak, Son of Lokmanya Tilak.
- Y. N. Kelkar, Historian, Son of Narasimha Chintaman Kelkar
- R. V. Oturkar, Historian
- S. P. P. Thorat, Padmashree, Lieutenant-General of Indian Army
- Tarabai Sathe, Member of Parliament
- Anantrao Patil, Member of Parliament
- Gulabrao Jedhe, Member of Parliament
- Sharad Talwalkar, Actor
- Govind Aphale, Kirtan Performer
- Krishnaji Panduranga Bhagwat, Author and Industrialist
- Yadunath Thatte, Journalist, Author and Biographer
- Yogini Joglekar, Author, Poet and Classical Singer
- Gauri Pradhan, TV Actress
- Mrinal Dev-Kulkarni, TV Actress
- Mukta Barve, Actress
- Madhura Datar, Singer
- Siddharth Chandekar, Actor
- Mrunmayee Deshpande, Actress
- Ritika Shrotri, Actress
- Akshay Ganpule, Indian Kho Kho player
