= Mangesh Padgaonkar =

Indian poet

Mangesh Keshav Padgaonkar
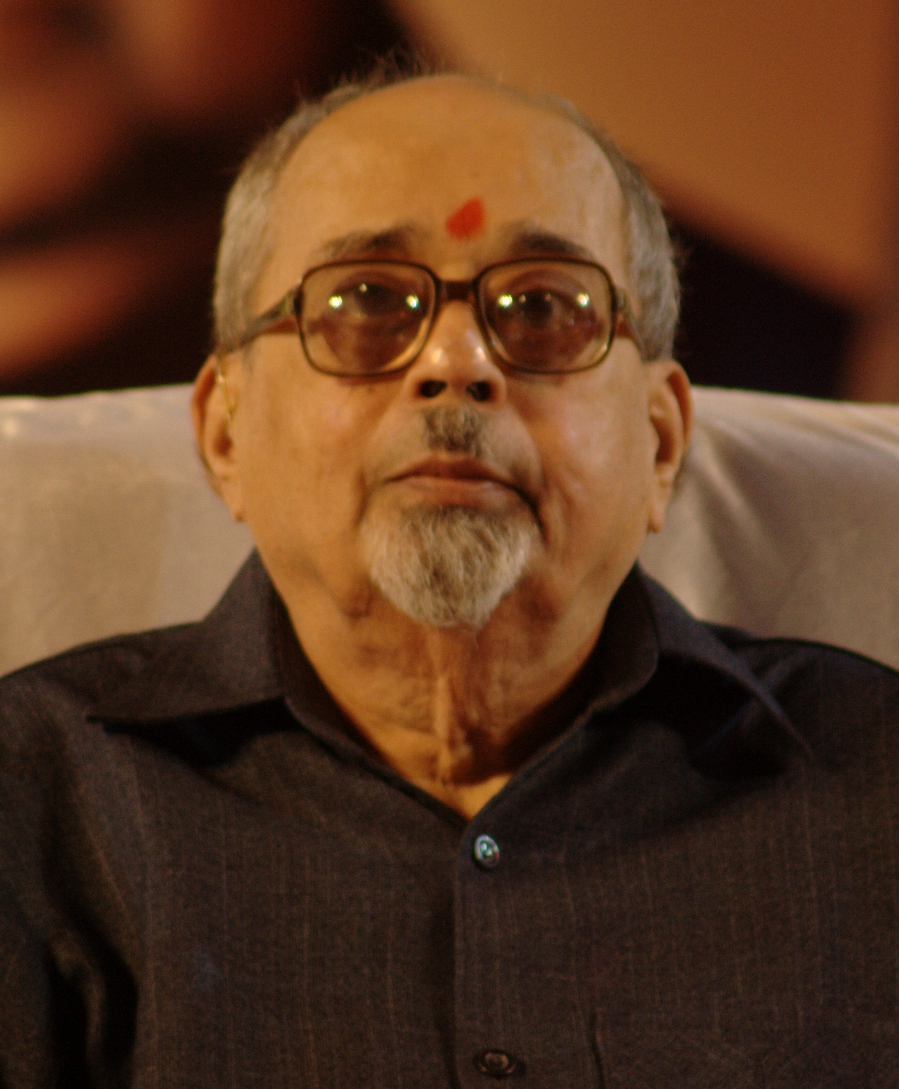
- Born: 10 March 1929; Vengurla, Sindhudurg District, Maharashtra
- Died: 30 December 2015 (aged 86); Mumbai, Maharashtra, India
- Known for: Marathi poetry
- Awards: Padma Bhushan (2013); Maharashtra Bhushan (2008); Sahitya Academy Award (1980); M.P. Literary Award (1956); Maharashtra State Award (1953-55)

Mangesh Keshav Padgaoankar (10 March 1929 – 30 December 2015) was a legendary Marathi poet from Maharashtra, India.

== Education ==
Padgaonkar was born on 10 March 1929 in Vengurla, Sindhudurg district in Maharashtra. He received a Master of Arts degree in Marathi and Sanskrit from the University of Bombay. Padgaonkar taught Marathi at Matushree Mithibai College in Mumbai for several years, and then during the 1970–1990 period served as an editor at the US Information Service (USIS), both in Mumbai. He also worked as an assistant editor at the Sadhana (weekly) for some time.

== Career ==
Padgaonkar started writing poems at the age of 14 and has 40 publications to his credit, most published by the publishing house Mouj Prakashan. While his first few books were collections of romantic poetry, he later published books in other genres including poetry for children, poetry reflecting socio-political issues, collection of essays and translations from English and other languages. The US Library of Congress has acquired 31 of his publications. The break from romantic poetry occurred in the collection "Salaam", which includes the poem of the book title that skewers the corrupt societal power structure around him. His books written for children include "Sutti Eke Sutti" and his collection of essays is called "Nimbonichya Zaadamage". Along with Vinda Karandikar and Vasant Bapat, Padgaonkar travelled across Maharashtra in the 1960s and 1970s reciting poetry. He was also a member of a Marathi literary group, “Murgi club”, loosely fashioned after the Algonquin Round Table. In addition to Padgaonkar, it included Vinda Karandikar, Vasant Bapat, Gangadhar Gadgil, Sadanand Rege and Shri Pu Bhagwat. They met every month for several years to eat together, engaging each other in wordplay and literary jokes.

During his employment at the USIS, Padgaonkar started working on translations in his spare time. The first few books he translated were American novels including "Pathfinder" by James Fenimore Cooper ("Watadya"). Later, following Kakasaheb Kalelkar's advice Padgaonkar translated works of Mirabai and published a book "Mira" in 1965. He also translated works of Kabir and Surdas in Marathi along with Shakespeare's plays The Tempest, Julius Caesar and Romeo and Juliet. These Shakespeare translations have been included in the Shakespeare Memorial at British town of Stratford upon Avon. His translation of Bible: The New Testament was published in 2008. Padgaonkar has nearly 20 publications of poems for children.

Along with translating the famous works of other authors, Padgaonkar also wrote forewords to these books wherein he has commented about the original authors, their styles of writing and literature of respective eras. A collection of these forewords is published as "Chintan" by Popular Publications. His book Shodh Kavitecha, an anthology of mostly previously published articles, discusses his own work and its criticism. He wrote about his poems, how they were born, their journeys so far and other author's views on them. Most of the articles in this book have been separately published previously. Another book, "Snehagatha", reminisces about the days he spent with other fellow authors and literary figures.

Padgaonkar has also written lyrics of many Marathi songs. Sung by Arun Date, his songs "Ya Janmawar, Ya Jaganyawar Shatada Prem Karawe", "Bhatukalichya Khelamadhali" and "Shukratara Mand Wara" are well known. In 1983–84, he also penned University of Pune's theme song "Punyamayee De Amha Akshar Vardaan". It was Pu La Deshpande who asked Padgaonkar to write this song in one day. It was then composed by music director Bhaskar Chandavarkar.

Padgaonkar has been president of the 2nd Vishwa Marathi Sahitya Sammelan held in Dubai in 2010 and organised by the Akhil Bharatiya Marathi Sahitya Mahamandal.

On Mangesh Padgaonkar's first death anniversary, the National Centre for the Performing Arts (India) paid an iconic tribute by organizing a lyrical event.

== Death ==
Padgaonkar died in Mumbai on 30 December 2015, after a brief illness, at age 86.

== Awards and recognition ==
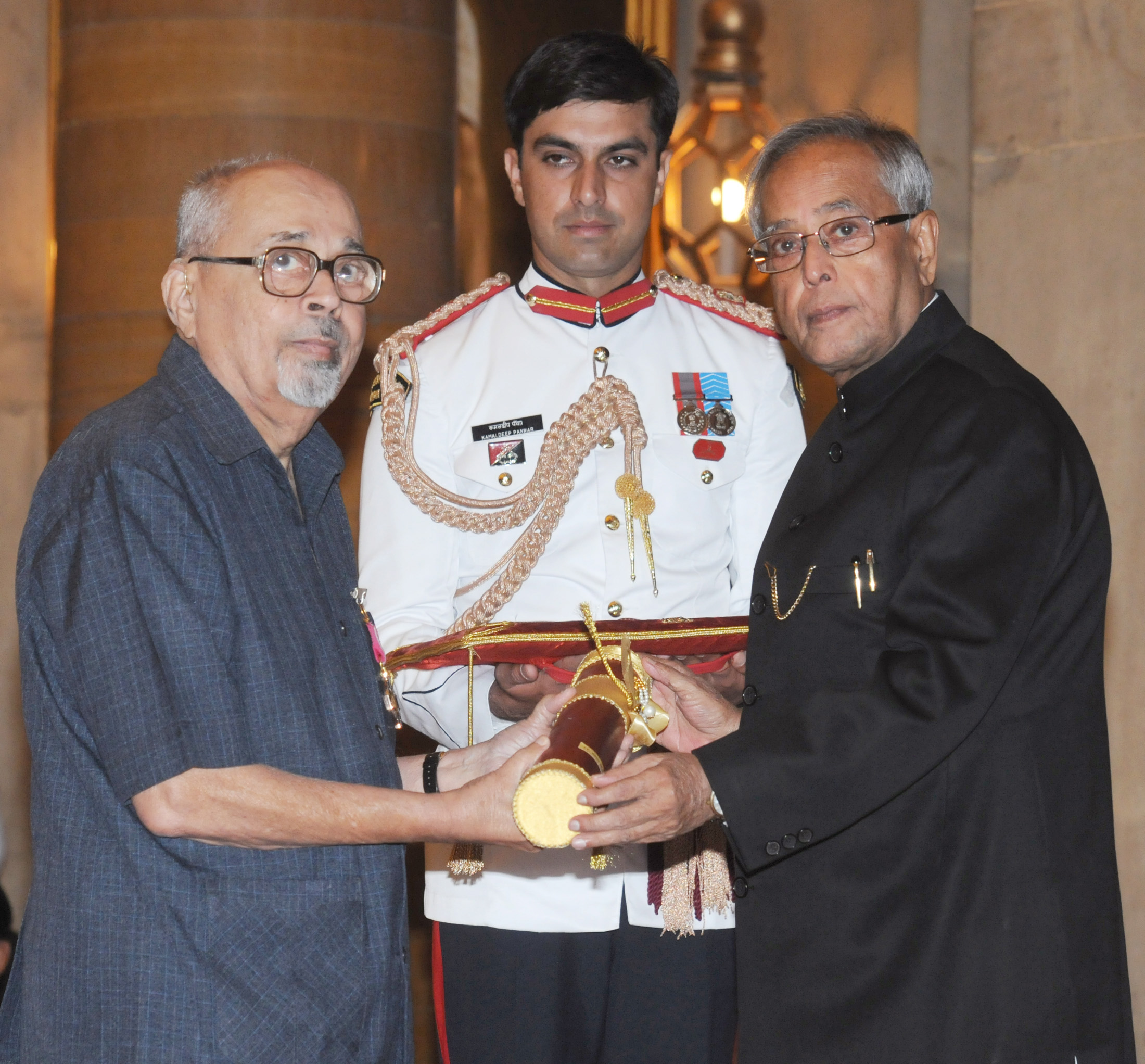
The President, Shri Pranab Mukherjee presenting the Padma Bhushan Award to Shri Mangesh Padgaonkar, at an Investiture Ceremony-II, at Rashtrapati Bhavan, in New Delhi on April 20, 2013

- Sahitya Academy Award in 1980 for his collection of poems Salam
- The M.P. Literary Conference Award in 1956,
- The Maharashtra State Award in 1953 and 1955.
- Maharashtra Bhushan Award in year 2008.
- "Jeevan Sadhana Gaurav Puraskar" by University of Pune, 2012
- Padma Bhushan in 2013.
- Maharashtra Sahitya Parishad Puraskar in 2013

== Works ==
=== Collections of poems ===
- Dharanrutya (1950)धारानृत्य (कवितासंग्रह)
- Sharmishtha (1960)शर्मिष्ठा (कवितासंग्रह)
- Kavyadarshan (1962)काव्यदर्शन (कवितासंग्रह)
- Utsav (1962)उत्सव (कवितासंग्रह)
- Salam (1980)सलाम (कवितासंग्रह)
- Gajhala (1981)गझल (कवितासंग्रह)
- Bhatake Pakshi (1984)भटके पक्षी (कवितासंग्रह)
- Tujhe Gita Ganyasathi (1989)तुझे गीत गाण्यासाठी (कवितासंग्रह)
- Bolagani (1990) बोलगाणी (कवितासंग्रह)
- Nava Diwas (1993) नवा दिवस (कवितासंग्रह)
- Sutti Eke Sutti (1993)सुट्टी एक्के सुट्टी (कवितासंग्रह)
- Jipsi (1994) जिप्सी (कवितासंग्रह)
- Mira (1995) मीरा (कवितासंग्रह) (मीराबाईंच्या भजनांचा अनुवाद)
- Triveni (1999)त्रिवेणी (कवितासंग्रह)
- Udasabodh (1996) उदासबोध (कवितासंग्रह)
- Kabir (1997)कबीर (कवितासंग्रह) (कबीराच्या दोह्यांचा अनुवाद)
- Vatratika(1999) वात्रटिका (कवितासंग्रह)
- Vidushak (1999) विदूषक (कवितासंग्रह)
- Moru (1999) मोरू (कवितासंग्रह)
- Phulpakharu Nile NIle फुलपाखरू निळं निळं
- Suradas (1999) सूरदास (कवितासंग्रह)
- Kavita Manasanchya, Manasasathi (1999) कविता माणसाच्या माणसासाठी (कवितासंग्रह)
- Snehagatha स्नेह्गाथा
- Radha (2000) राधा (कवितासंग्रह)
- Dharanrtya
- Ale Megh Bharoon (2010) आले मेघ भरून (कवितासंग्रह)
- Aphat Rao अफाट राव
- Ase Hote Gandhiji असे होते गांधीजी
- Bible: Nava Karar बायबल : नवा करार
- Chhori छोरी (कवितासंग्रह)
- Bholanath भोलानाथ (कवितासंग्रह)
- Chandomama चांदोमामा (कवितासंग्रह)
- Veda Kokru वेड कोकरू (कवितासंग्रह)
- Surdas सूरदास (कवितासंग्रह)
- Chintan चिंतन
- Anand Rhutu आनंदऋतू (कवितासंग्रह)
- Sur Anandghan सूर आनंदघन (कवितासंग्रह)
- Mukhavte मुखवटे (कवितासंग्रह)
- Kavyadarshan काव्यदर्शन (कवितासंग्रह)
- Trunparne तृणपर्णे (कवितासंग्रह)
- Girki गिरकी (कवितासंग्रह)
- Anandache Dohi आनंदाचे डोही (कवितासंग्रह)
- Julius Caesar ज्युलिअस सीझर (नाटक)

=== Plays ===
- Vadal वादळ (नाटक)

=== Books ===
- Katharup Mahabharat - Part 1 कथारूप महाभारत खंड १
- Katharup Mahabharat - Part 2 कथारूप महाभारत खंड २
- Romeo and Juliet
- Kshanika क्षणिका
- Nimbonichya zadamage निंबोणीच्या झाडामागे
- Shikshan: Jeevan Rahasya शिक्षण : जीवन रहस्य
- Shodh Kavitecha शोध कवितेचा
- Snehgatha स्नेहगाथा –×
- Sutti Eke Sutti सुट्टी एके सुट्टी
- Vadhdiwasachi Bhet वाढदिवसाची भेट
- Vede Kokru वेडं कोकरू
- Zule Bai Zula झुले बाई झुला
- Aata Khela Nacha आता खेळा नाचा

=== Anthologies ===
- several pieces translated to English, in The Tenth Rasa: An Anthology of Indian Nonsense (2007)
