= Vasant Bapat =

Marathi poet

- Vasant Bapat
- Born: 25 July 1922; Karad in Satara district of Maharashtra
- Died: 17 September 2002 (aged 80); Pune, Maharashra, India
- Known for: Marathi Poetry

Vishwanath Vaman Bapat, also known as Vasant Bapat (Devanagari: वसंत बापट; July 25, 1922 – September 17, 2002), was a Marathi poet from Maharashtra, India.

He was born on July 25, 1922, in Karad in Satara district of Maharashtra.

== Education and teaching career ==
Bapat received a master's degree in Marathi and Sanskrit literature from Sir Parshurambhau College in Pune in 1948. He then taught Sanskrit and Marathi until 1976, first, National College and then Ramnarain Ruia College, both in Mumbai. During 1974-1982, he served as the Rabindranath Tagore Chair at Mumbai University.

== Career ==
Bapat was a part of freedom struggle and participated in the Quit India Movement of 1942. He was incarcerated in jail from August 1943 to January 1945. Bapat completed his education after his release and began his career as a Professor of Sanskrit and Marathi. He also served as professor of Gurudev Tagore comparative literature at the Bombay University from 1974 to 1982. Bapat was also the editor of a socialist magazine Sadhana from 1983 to 1988. Bapat wrote some literature for children, including a play, Bal Govind.

He has penned 30 poetry books, including immensely popular Bijlee, Sethu, Akravi Disha, Sakina and Manasi. The trio of poets Bapat, Vinda Karandikar and Mangesh Padgaonkar provided for many years public recitals of their poetry in different towns in Maharashtra. Along with Vinda Karandikar and Padgaonkar, Bapat travelled across Maharashtra in the 1960s and 1970s reciting poetry. He was also a member of a Marathi literary group, “Murgi club”, loosely fashioned after the Algonquin Round Table. In addition to Bapat, it included Vinda Karandikar, Mangesh Padgaonkar, Gangadhar Gadgil, Sadanand Rege and Shri Pu Bhagwat. They met every month for several years to eat together, engaging each other in wordplay and literary jokes.

As an official representative of India, Bapat participated in 1969 in an international poetry conference in Yugoslavia. He was the president of regional Sahitya Sammelan at Jalgaon, Mumbai, South Maharashtra and other places. Bapat served for ten years as an appointed member of Sahitya Akademi in New Delhi. For many years, he was a member of Indian Institute of Mass Communication, also in New Delhi, and Sangeet Natak Academy in Maharashtra.

He chaired Marathi Sahitya Sammelan in Mumbai in 1999.

== Death ==
Bapat died in pune at a private hospital following a brief illness at the age of 80. He underwent an operation on Thursday last for a clot in the brain and since then his condition had been deteriorating.

== Literary career ==
Bapat published 30 collections of his poems. The following is a partial list of them:

- Bijalee (1952)
- Akaravi Disha (1962)
- Sakina)
- Manasi (1977)
- Shatataraka
- Shinga Phunkale Rani(In Marath-'िशंग फुंिकले रणी)'
- Shoor Mardacha Powada
- Tejasi
- Rajasi
- Prawasachya Kawita
- Setu

The following is a partial list of Bapat's other works:

- Bara Gavache Pani (1967) (A travelogue)
- Jinkuni Maranala (A biography)
- Taulanik Sahityabhyas (1981) (A critique)
- Wisajipantanchi Bakhar (A political parody)

== Musician ==
- उत्तुंग आमुची उत्तर सीमा Uttung Aamuchi Uttar
- सैन्य चालले पुढे Sainya Chalale Pudhe

== Political activism ==
During his student days, Bapat was a member of Rashtra Seva Dal, and participated in the 1942 Quit India movement under Gandhi's leadership against British Raj. In the August 1943-January 1945 period, he suffered imprisonment for the participation.

He was actively associated with Rashtra Seva Dal since its inception by Sane Guruji in 1948. During 1983-1988, he edited weekly Sadhana, which expressed the views of Rashtra Seva Dal. Under Rashtra Seva Dal's sponsorship, he presented to the public Maharashtra Darshan, Bharat Darshan, Shivadarshan, and Azadi Ki Jung performances.

Bapat was associated with the Socialist Party and its leaders, including S.M. Joshi, N.G. Gore, G.P. Pradhan, and Madhu Limaye.
