= Amrut Kansar =

Indian politician and lawyer (c. 1950–2017)

Member of Parliament, Lok Sabha
- In office March 1977 – August 1979
- Preceded by: Purushottam Kakodkar
- Succeeded by: Sanyogita Rane
- Constituency: North Goa

Personal details
- Born: Amrut Shivram Kansar c. 1950 Bicholim, Goa, Portuguese India
- Died: 11 September 2017 Goa Medical College
- Party: Maharashtrawadi Gomantak Party
- Other political affiliations: Indian National Congress; Rashtra Seva Dal

Amrut Shivram Kansar (c. 1950 – 11 September 2017) was an Indian politician. He was a Member of Parliament, Lok Sabha representing the North Goa Lok Sabha constituency from 1977 to 1979.

== Early life ==
Kansar was born in Bicholim and completed a Masters of Law in Poona.

== Political career ==
In March 1977, Kansar represented the Maharashtrawadi Gomantak Party (MGP) and was chosen as the Member of Parliament for the North Goa Lok Sabha constituency. He polled 66,933 votes, which was 44% of the vote share and was a lead of 11,066 votes over Purushottam Kakodkar of the Indian National Congress.

As a parliamentarian, Kansar raised several important issues affecting Goans like the local bonded labour system, the Mokasso system in Sattari and spread of diseases like tuberculosis due to pollution from mining. He also forced the Central Government to make public the report on the mortality of fish which was caused by pollution from the Zuari Agro Chemicals factory in Goa. He was then 30-years old, and these actions of his upset Shashikala Kakodkar, the then leader of the MGP.

Kansar was thus a strong advocate of the Bahujan Samaj and participated in programmes of the Rashtra Seva Dal. The Times of India describes him as being socialist.

Kansar contested the 1984 Lok Sabha election as an Independent candidate and lost, polling only 4% of the votes. He later contested the 1996 Lok Sabha election, representing the Congress, losing after polling 38% of the votes.

== Legal career ==
Kansar published his own magazine, Sarita. He was successful as a lawyer, eventually becoming a High Court lawyer. He also worked against the caste system in Goa. He was an expert in constitutional law, Portuguese law, Uniform Civil Code in Goa and laws related to temples, Mundkar Act and tenancy. He won cases for the people of Madkai and Poriem.

== Death ==
Kansar died on 11 September 2017 at the Goa Medical College and Hospital. He lived in St Cruz and his funeral was held on 12 September.
