= Vinda Karandikar =

Indian writer

Govind Karandikar
- Born: 23 August 1918; Dhalavali, Bombay Province, British India
- Died: 14 March 2010 (aged 91); Mumbai, India
- Education: M.A.
- Occupations: Writer; poet; essayist; critic
- Spouse: Sumati Karandikar
- Children: 3
- Writing career
- Pen name: Vindā Karandikar
- Notable awards: Sahitya Akademi Fellowship (1996); Jnanpith Award (2003)

Govind Vinayak Karandikar (23 August 1918 – 14 March 2010), better known as Vindā, was an Indian poet, writer, literary critic, and translator in the Marathi-language.

== Early life ==
Karandikar was born on 23 August 1918, in Dhalavali village in the Devgad taluka present-day Sindhudurg district of Maharashtra.

== Works ==
Karandikar's poetic works include Svedgangā (River of Sweat) (1949), Mrudgandha (1954), Dhrupad (1959), Jātak (1968), and Virupika (1980). Two anthologies of his selected poems, Sanhita (1975) and Adimaya (1990) were also published. His poetic works for children include Rānichā Bāg (1961), Sashyāche Kān (1963), and Pari Ga Pari (1965). Experimentation has been a feature of Karandikar's Marathi poems. He also translated his own poems in English, which were published as "Vinda Poems" (1975). He also modernized old Marathi literature like Dnyaneshwari and Amrutānubhawa.

Besides having been a prominent Marathi poet, Karandikar has contributed to Marathi literature as an essayist, a critic, and a translator. He translated Poetics of Aristotle and King Lear of Shakespeare in Marathi. Karandikar's collections of short essays include Sparshaachi Palvi (1958) and Akashacha Arth (1965). Parampara ani Navata (1967), is a collection of his analytical reviews.

The trio of poets Vasant Bapat, Vinda Karandikar and Mangesh Padgaonkar provided for many years public recitals of their poetry in different towns in Maharashtra. Along with Vasant Bapat and Padgaonkar, Karandikar travelled across Maharashtra in the 1960s and 1970s reciting poetry. Karandikar was also a member of a Marathi literary group called "Murgi club", loosely fashioned after the Algonquin Round Table. In addition to Karandikar, it included Vasant Bapat, Mangesh Padgaonkar, Gangadhar Gadgil, Sadanand Rege and Shri Pu Bhagwat. They met every month for several years to eat together, engaging each other in wordplay and literary jokes.

== Awards ==
Karandikar was conferred the 39th Jnanpith Award in 2006, which is the highest literary award in India. He was the third Marathi writer to win the Jnanpith Award, after Vishnu Sakharam Khandekar (1974) and Vishnü Vāman Shirwādkar (Kusumagraj) (1987). Karandikar also received some other awards for his literary work including the Keshavasut Prize, the Soviet Land Nehru Literary Award, the Kabir Samman, and the Sahitya Akademi Fellowship in 1996.

== Death ==
Vinda Karandikar died on 14 March 2010 at the age of 91 in Mumbai following a brief illness.
