= Adgaon-chothava-Yeola =

Village in Maharashtra, India

Coordinates: 20.00°N 74.52°E

Adgaon Chothava is a village in Yeola taluka (tahsil), Nashik district, Maharashtra, India.

Adgaon Chothava is 5 km from Yeola.

== Agriculture ==
Most people of Adgaon Chothava are farmers. Popular crops are wheat and onions.
