= Mukti Bhoomi =

Coordinates: 20.0505°N 74.4892°E

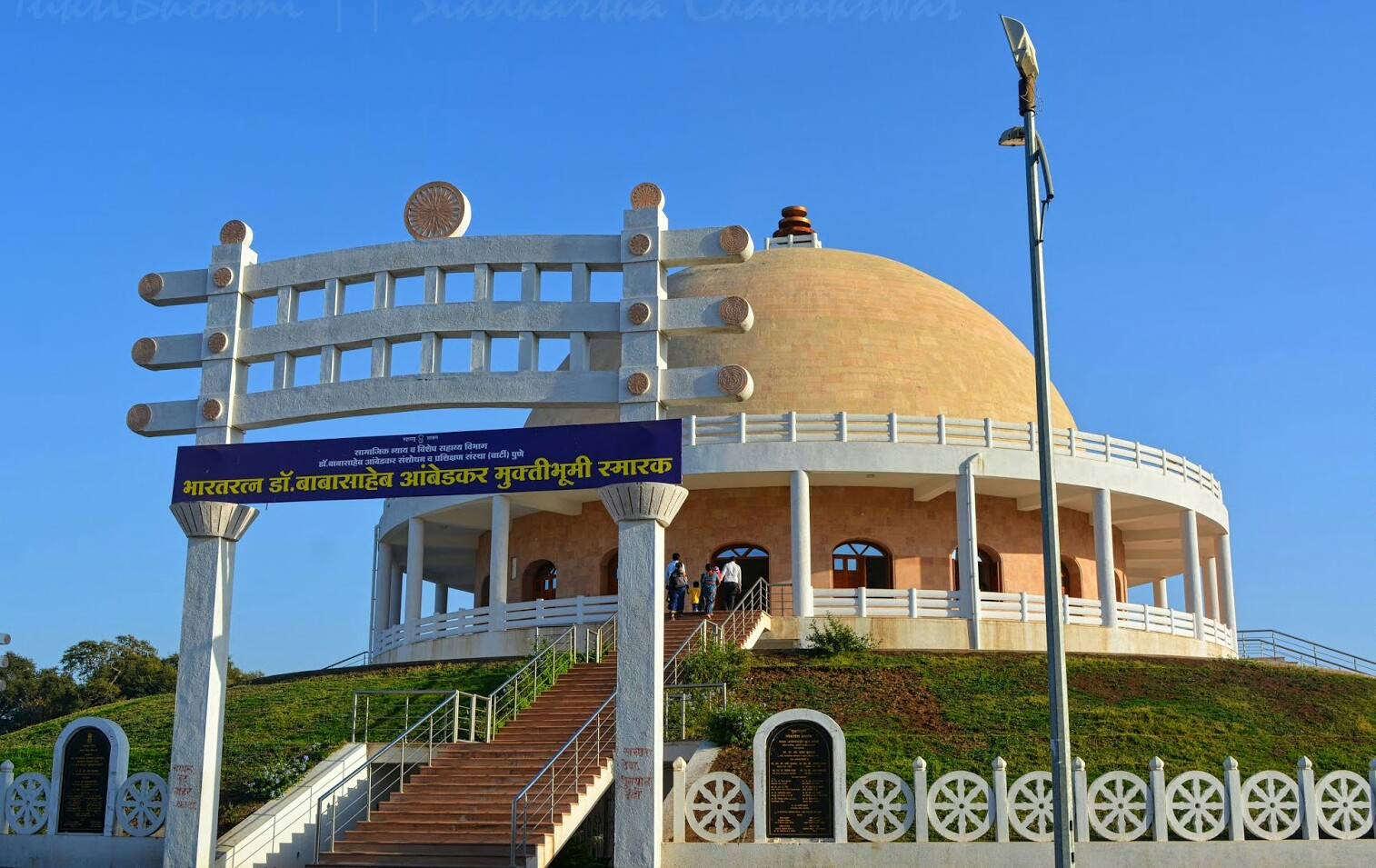
- Bharatratna Dr. Babasaheb Ambedkar Mooktibhoomi Memorial, Yeola
- Interactive map of Mukti Bhoomi
- Location: Yeola, India
- Beginning date: 13 October 2009
- Completion date: 2 April 2014

Mukti Bhoomi (lit. 'Land of Liberation') is a Buddhist stupa, and memorial and museum located in Yeola, Maharashtra, India. The site is dedicated to B. R. Ambedkar, a scholar, the father of the Indian Constitution and the leader of the Dalit Buddhist movement. The memorial was officially inaugurated on 2 April 2014.

Mukti Bhoomi holds historical importance as the site where Ambedkar first publicly renounced Hinduism and announced his decision to convert to another religion. During this momentous occasion, he declared, “Though I was born a Hindu, I solemnly assure you that I will not die as a Hindu.” This announcement took place on 13 October 1935 and marked a turning point in the history of social reform and religious identity in India. The event laid the foundation for Ambedkar's eventual conversion to Buddhism in 1956, along with millions of his followers.

Recognizing its cultural and historical significance, the Government of Maharashtra has designated Mukti Bhoomi as a 'Category B' pilgrimage site. Since its inauguration, the memorial has become a major destination for Ambedkarites, Buddhists and general visitors, drawing large numbers of people throughout the year.

The site frequently hosts a range of events, including cultural festivals, social gatherings, and educational programs, aimed at promoting the values of equality, justice, and human rights espoused by Ambedkar. These activities have contributed to Mukti Bhoomi’s role as a living center of inspiration and community engagement.

== Museum and Buddhist stupa ==
Dr. Babasaheb Ambedkar announced his decision to renounce Hinduism at Yeola on 13 October 1956. Recognizing the significance of this declaration, activists of the Ambedkarite movement and the Government of Maharashtra decided to construct a memorial at the site. This memorial has been developed in the form of a museum and a Buddhist stupa. The construction of the Buddhist memorial began with a foundation ceremony on 13 October 2009, and the memorial was inaugurated on 2 April 2014.

Inside of the memorial display a detailed account of Dr. Babasaheb Ambedkar's life, important related documents, original photographs, statues of Lord Buddha and Dr. Ambedkar, and a mural depicting the declaration of religious conversion. The site serves as a center of educational, historical, and religious importance.

== Buddhist Bhikkhu Vipassana Center ==
On 3 March 2024, Chhagan Bhujbal, then serving as the Minister of Food, Civil Supplies and Consumer Protection in the Government of Maharashtra, inaugurated the Buddhist Bhikkhu Vipassana Center at Mukti Bhoomi in Yeola. The inauguration marked a significant development in the continued commemoration of Ambedkar’s legacy at the site. During the event, Bhujbal highlighted the historical importance of Mukti Bhoomi, stating: "This is the place where Dr. Babasaheb Ambedkar made the announcement of his conversion in Yeola. Around 10 thousand people witnessed this historic moment. This place is one of the most important places in Ambedkar's life. Hence, today is a significant day."

The establishment of the Vipassana Center reflects the site's growing role not only as a memorial but also as a center for Buddhist practice and education, aligning with Ambedkar’s vision of social transformation through Buddhism.

== History ==
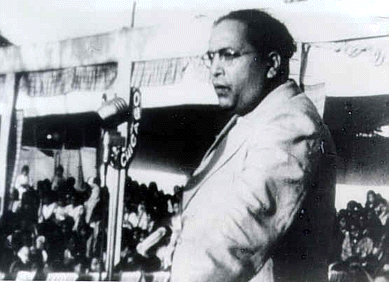
B. R. Ambedkar delivering a speech

Dr. Babasaheb Ambedkar held an important conference on 13 October 1935 in Yeola, a town in Nashik district, Maharashtra. There, he withdrew from the Kalaram Temple Satyagraha and made a powerful declaration: "Though I was born a Hindu, I will not die a Hindu."
