= Lakhubai Temple Dindiravan =

Coordinates: 17°40′58″N 75°20′12″E

Religion
- Affiliation: Hinduism
- Deity: Rukmini as Lakhubai

Location
- Location: Pandharpur, Maharastra

Lakhubai Temple Dindiravan is a Hindu temple is a Hindu temple in Pandharpur, in the Solapur district of Maharashtra, India. Situated in the area traditionally known as Dindiravan (Diṇḍīravana), the temple is dedicated to the goddess Lakhubai, who is locally identified with Rukmini, the consort of Krishna and Vithoba.

== Legend ==
According to scholar Ramchandra Chintaman Dhere, Lakhubai is understood in the religious tradition of Pandharpur to be Rukmini, who withdrew to the Dindiravan after becoming angry with Krishna. The tradition relates that Krishna subsequently came to the forest in search of her. Dhere associates this narrative with the wider religious geography and development of the Vithoba tradition at Pandharpur.

The representation of Lakhubai at the site is an uncarved or shapeless sacred stone traditionally covered with red lead. There is a sculpted image situated behind it, the iconography resembling Gajalakshmi. Although Lakhubai is identified with Rukmini in the Vaishnava tradition of Pandharpur, the sculpted image resembles Gajalakshmi rather than a conventional representation of Rukmini.

According to local tradition, Rukmini, worshipped at Dindiravan as Lakhubai, came to the forest after leaving Krishna and performed penance there. One local legend also associates Lakhubai with the demon Dindirasura, whom she is said to have slain while residing or performing penance in the area. The forest is traditionally associated with the name Dindirasura, although other regional traditions attribute the demon's defeat to a Vithoba.
