= Rashtra Seva Dal =

National Volunteer Union

- Abbreviation: RSD
- Formation: 4 June 1936
- Founders: Sane Guruji
- Founded at: Pune
- Type: Democratic Socialist organisation
- Headquarters: Sane Guruji Smarak, Sinhagad Road, Pune, Maharashtra, India
- Region served: India
- National President: Ajit Shinde
- Website: www.rashtrasevadal.org

Rashtra Seva Dal (RSD) is an Indian social, cultural and youth organisation. It was founded by Sane Guruji in 1936 during the Indian independence movement which was led by Mahatma Gandhi. It is headquartered in Pune, Maharashtra.

== History ==
Rashtra Seva Dal (RSD) was founded in 1936 by Pandurang Sadashiv Sane (Sane Guruji). The organization was reorganised on 4 June 1941 by leaders S. M. Joshi, Shirubhau Limaye, and N. G. Gore with guidance of Dr. N. S. Hardikar and Sane Guruji. Sane Guruji was the main figure associated to the organisation during its early years.

=== Organisation ===
Rashtra Seva Dal is a public trust organization by its own constitution. It works through a democratically elected structure.

The shakha is the basic unit of organisation, where its volunteers participate in civic education, physical training, community services and cultural activities. RSD functions independently of political parties and does not any contest to Indian elections.

=== Historical background (1923–1941) ===
The origin of Rashtra Seva Dal (RSD) is associated with the Indian independence movement. In 1923, Dr. N. S. Hardikar, a freedom fighter who founded the Hindustani Seva Dal to train volunteers for the national movement and the Indian National Congress. In 1932, RSD was prohibited by the British Raj during the Civil Disobedience Movement.

In 1930s, the leaders and activists including S. M. Joshi, Shirubhau Limaye, N. G. Gore and Dr. V. M. Hardikar advocated the creation of a democratic and secular youth organisation based on civic discipline, equality and public service. And on 4 June 1941, it led to the foundation of Rashtra Seva Dal (RSD) in Pune, Maharashtra.

=== Women's organisation ===
A women's organisation named The Samajwadi Mahila Sabha is associated with Rashtra Seva Dal. This organisation encourages women's participation in civic education, leadership, democratic public life and social reform.

== Notable people associated ==
Rashtra Seva Dal (RSD) is associated with a number of socialist leaders, freedom fighters, social reformers, activists, artists, writers and cultural workers. The following is the list which contains the names of such personalitis.

=== List of leaders ===
	Name	Known for
1	Pandurang Sadashiv Sane	Founder of Rashtra Seva Dal, Marathi writer, teacher and freedom fighter
1	S. M. Joshi	Freedom fighter and socialist leader; first Dal Pramukh of Rashtra Seva Dal
1	Nilu Phule	Indian actor, social worker
1	Pramila Dandavate	Political activist
1	Sanjeev Sane	Activist, social worker, politician
1	Indumati Babuji Patankar	Freedom fighter, Activist, social worker
1	Yadunath Thatte	Marathi journalist, editor, biographer, social worker and socialist leader
1	Hamid Dalwai	Indian journalist, social reformer, activist, author
1	Ram Nagarkar	Marathi film and stage actor and a stand up comedian, social activist
1	Nagnath Naikwadi	Indian independence activist, social worker, politician
1	Sadanand Varde	Socialist leader, politician, and freedom fighter
1	Vishwanath Lawande	Indian independence activist and lawyer
1	Kranti Shah	Social activist
1	Amrut Kansar	Indian politician.
1	Vasant Bapat	Marathi poet and social activist
1	Shreeram Lagoo	Indian film and theatre actor
1	Smita Patil	Indian Actress
1	Kapil Patil	Indian socialist politician

=== List of leaders ===
	Leader Name	Term
1	S. M. Joshi	1941–1945
2	Dr. V. M. Hardikar	1945–1947
3	S. M. Joshi	1947–1954
4	Bhausaheb Ranade	1955–1961
5	Nana Dengale	1962–1964
6	Dr. R. N. Ambike	1964–1965
7	Shyamrao Patwardhan	1965–1969
8	Yadunath Thatte	1970–1973
9	Bapusaheb Kaldate	1973–1976
10	Liladhar Hegde	1976–1979
11	Sudhatai Varde	1979–1982
12	Shyamrao Patwardhan	1982–1985
13	Pannalal Surana	1985–1995
14	Sudhatai Varde	1995–1997
15	Prakash Kamble	1997–2001
16	Bhai Vaidya	2001–2003
17	Subhash Ware	2003–2007
18	Bharat Latkar	2007–2011
19	Arvind Kapole	2011–2015
20	George Jacob	2015–2017
21	Suresh Khairnar	2017–2019
22	Ganesh Devy	2019–2022
23	Nitin Vaidya	2022–2025
24	Ajit Shinde	2025–present
