= Sanyogita Rane =

Indian politician (1923–2017)

Member of Parliament, Lok Sabha
- In office 1980–1984
- Preceded by: Amrut Kansar
- Succeeded by: Shantaram Naik
- Constituency: North Goa

Personal details
- Born: 20 August 1923
- Died: 12 January 2017 (aged 93) Goa, India

Sanyogita Rane Sardesai (20 August 1923 – 12 January 2017) was an Indian politician and Goa's first woman parliamentarian, elected as the Member of Parliament of North Goa in 1980 on Maharashtrawadi Gomantak Party (MGP) ticket.

== Early life and education ==
Rane was born on 20 August 1923 in Gwalior, Madhya Pradesh. Her father was Captain Dattaji Rao Bhosle. She was married to Major Zoiba S. Rane Sardesai from Sattari. She was the mother of Vir Chakra decorated (posthumous), Second Lieutenant Jayendra Rane of the fifth Garhwal Rifles. She was educated at Gajra Raje High School in Gwalior where she did her matriculation.

== Political life ==
Rane was the Lok Sabha MP from the year 1980 to 1985. She was elected on the Maharastrawadi Gomantak Party (MGP) ticket, becoming Goa's only woman MP to win Lok Sabha polls. She also contested unsuccessfully as an independent in 1984 and 1991 Lok Sabha elections. She was an active politician of post Goa Liberation period, as the MP of North Goa in 1980. She was one of the very few women who entered into the field of active politics.

Rane was an active social worker. She was a member of the Army Welfare Centre, Bhuj (1952–59) and Mahila Mandal, Bhuj (1953–59) She served as a secretary at Maharani Shanta Devi Gaikwad Graha Shastra Sanstha, Kolhapur (1967—69). She was a member of the Family and Child Welfare Centre, Bicholim, Goa since 1974 and the Mahila Imdad, Goa Branch since 1977. She was also part of the Mid-day Meal Programme of Mine-Labourers' Children of North Goa, since 1976.

== Death ==
Rane died, aged 93, at her residence at Curchirem, Sanquelim, in North Goa. She was survived by two sons and a daughter.
