= Shankar Dattatraya Javdekar =

Indian writer

Shankar Dattatraya Javdekar (1894–1955, alternatively Javadekar or Jawadekar), popularly known as Acharya Javdekar, was a Marathi writer from Bombay State, India.

He was born on 26 September 1894. His schooling was in Kolhapur, and he did his B.A. from Fergusson College, Pune, specialising in philosophy.

While studying for his M.A. degree, he set aside his studies to join Mahatma Gandhi's non-cooperation movement against the British Raj. During 1923–26, he operated a dormitory for students belonging to the untouchable community in the Indian society of his times. This dormitory was located in a village near Islampur in Maharashtra.

Subsequently, Javdekar served as the editor of the dailies Navashakti (New Power) and Lok Shakti (People's Power). He was the editor of the weekly Sadhana from 1950 to 1952.

Javdekar was a social democrat in his political thinking, and was influenced by the political and social views of Mahatma Gandhi. In his 1954 book सर्वोदय आणि समाजवाद (Sarwodaya and Samajwad), he propounded Satyagrahi Samajwad (सत्याग्रही समाजवाद) philosophy, attempting to amalgamate Marxism and Gandhism. He also attempted to reconcile the views of Tilak and Gandhi in his book लो. टिळक व म. गांधी (Lokamnya Tilak Wa Mahatma Gandhi).

In his literary work "आधुनिक भारत" (Adhunik Bharat) (1938), he described the philosophical evolution of India through its struggle for freedom from the British rule.

He presided over Marathi Sahitya Sammelan in Pune in 1949. He died on 10 December 1955.

== Literary work ==
The following is a partial list of Javdekar's works:

- आधुनिक भारत (Adhunik Bharat) (1938)
- गांधीजींचे चरित्र - जीवनरहस्य (Gandhijinche Charitra - Jivan Rahasya)
- राज्यशास्त्रमीमांसा
- आधुनिक राज्यमीमांसा
- विश्वकुटुंबवाद
- शास्त्रीय समाजवाद
- सर्वोदय आणि समाजवाद (Sarwodaya and Samajwad) (1954)
- लोकशाही
- पुरोगामी साहित्य
- गांधीवाद
- लो. टिळक व म. गांधी
