= Sanjeev Sane =

Indian socialist politician and social advocate

- संजीव साने
- Born: c. 1957; Thane, Maharashtra, India
- Died: 2022 (aged 64–65); Thane, Maharashtra, India
- Years active: 1970s-2022 (his death)

Sanjeev Sane (c. 1957, Thane - 28 October 2022, Thane) was a socialist politician, anti-corruption activist, and social advocate from Thane, India. Throughout his life, he was involved with a number of organisations, including Rashtra Seva Dal, Samajwadi Jan Parishad, Jagtikikaran Virodhi Kruti Samiti, Aam Aadmi Party, and Swaraj Abhiyan.

== Early life ==
Sane was born and raised in Thane. His parents, Anna and Yamanutai Sane, were actively involved in the Indian freedom struggle; both served jail time at some point as a result. He and his sister Sadhna were both interested in advocacy early in life.

== Activism ==
Sane worked for typewriter company E. Remington and Sons. When it was facing closure, he organised employees to take over management of the factories instead; this was successful and the company stayed open until workers were replaced by technological advances. Sane then devoted himself entirely to social and political work.

During The Emergency in 1975-1977, Sane worked with Rashtra Seva Dal and participated in Satyagraha, which saw him arrested for eight days in Thane. He also took part in Namantar Andolan in support of changing Marathwada University's name to honor B. R. Ambedkar. In 1983, he helped found Samata Andolan by merging a number of other groups; he worked with this organisation until December 1994.

Sane joined the Samajwadi Jan Parishad party when it was formed on 1 January 1995. He served first as secretary, then vice-president and executive. He also joined Jagtikikaran Virodhi Kruti Samiti, an anti-globalisation platform for like-minded political groups, upon its foundation in 1999. Sane formed and served as president of Thane Matadata Jagran Abhiyaan, a citizen's forum to fight against property tax based on capital value. He was also associated with the Municipal Labour Union, Marathwada Labour Union, and Shoshit Jan Andolan and helped organize the 2004 World Social Forum.

During the first six months of the COVID-19 pandemic, Sane was the working president of the We Need You Society and collected money and delivered food to labourers in economic crisis. Decades before, he provided similar relief efforts during the 1977 Andhra Pradesh cyclone and the 1993 Latur earthquake. He organized the Baliraj's Children program to spread awareness of the farmers' suicide problem in India. He also oversaw a movement against Enron that opposed globalisation and special economic zones. He wrote several books and articles for newspapers about social issues and was a trustee and president of the Sane Guruji Rashtriya Smarak Trust.

In 2011, Sane joined the anti-corruption movement, which eventually turned into the Aam Aadmi Party. In 2014, he was chosen to represent the party as its Lok Sabha candidate from Thane. The following year, he joined the party's spin-off Swaraj Abhiyan, where he served as regional vice president.

Sane was the recipient of the Dr. B.L. Bhole Memorial Worker Award, the Nilu Phule Memorial Award, and the Hon. Shri S.M. Joshi Award.

== Personal life and death ==
Sane died on 28 October 2022 from cancer. He was in remission prior to the cancer being rediscovered and passed after requesting that the treatment be stopped. He is survived by his wife Neeta and son Nimesh.
