= Kranti Shah =

Social Worker, Humanitarian and Founder of Yuvak Biradari (Bharat)

- Born: 1942 (age 83–84); Sangli
- Organization: Yuvak Biradari
- Honours: Padma Shri
- Website: www.biradari.org

Kranti Shah is an Indian social worker and the founder and director of Yuvak Biradari (Bharat) which is a voluntary, social, educational, cultural and youth movement of India. He has championed the cause of social welfare and youth development since 1974. He was awarded the Padma Shri by Govt. of India in 2010 in the field of Social work

== Biography ==
He comes from an illustrious family of freedom fighters and philanthropist-businessman of Sangli in Maharashtra. He is a Graduate from Fergusson College, Pune. His own public life began during his school days when he was actively involved in Rashtra Seva Dal, then with Sane Guruji's Antar Bharati movement, and later he was elected as President of the Maharashtra Students’ Council. He proceeded to set up a Coffee Club for youngsters to engage in social reconstruction. At the time, he led disaster relief and rehabilitation work in the 60s and 70s for Koyna earthquake victims, Bangladeshi refugees in the aftermath of the Indo-Pak war as well as in the drought and famine-stricken regions. As his work shaped up over time, he founded the organisation Yuvak Biradari in 1974.

Over the years under his leadership, Yuvak Biradari's awareness campaigns (long marches) have traversed 35,000 km through padayatra or cycle yatra by hundreds of youngsters and artists across 22 Indian states and were titled as Jodo Bharat Yatra (National Integration and brotherhood), Shanti Yatra (Peace marches), Vasundhara Bachao Abhiyaan (Save the Earth through environment protection), Swachhata Abhiyaan (Cleanliness and Hygiene) and Kanya Bachao Abhiyaan (Save the girl child) among others. A few examples of these marches are: ‘Ba se Bapu’ (from Pune-2 October to Delhi-14 November 1984), Sabarmati se Brahmaputra (from Ahmedabad-31 October to Guwahati-31 December 1989 and Shilong-12 January 1989), Mandovi se Yamuna (Panaji-18 December 1998 to Delhi-30 January 1999), Dandi Smriti Sankalp Abhiyaan (75 towns of Maharashtra and Gujarat from 11 March – 6 April 2005) etc.

In the last three decades, more than one lakh trees have been planted with volunteers in different regions. He conceptualised the Ek Sur Ek Taal social and value education programme using the medium of music, and to date, 21 lakh students have been directly trained in India by their faculty. The social themes of Biradari's 2500 cultural presentations have created long-lasting impressions on Indians. These have been ballet productions that were the brainchild of Shah to raise social awareness and consciousness. He has organised numerous educational camps, self-employment workshops for rural youth for their economic empowerment, art workshops which have trained 20000 youth till date and developed a generation of responsible citizens. His organisation's relief and rehabilitation work for riot-hit, earthquake, flood and drought victims kindled hope among many groups. Cultural inter-state programmes organised by him across the length and breadth of India have been memorable events in the organisation's history. Seminars on issues relevant to social change, grassroots projects by youngsters, and mentoring hundreds of youth have been his continuous activities. During this journey, many national public figures from the fields of literature, art, social activism, politics, business and academia rendered support to his movement. Thousands of Biradars (members) from around 10 states of the nation were integrated in this long journey.

== Awards and recognition ==
- Shah was the recipient of Maharashtra Government's first Shiva Chhatrapati Yuva Award in 1983.
- Accolades to Yuvak Biradari (Bharat) like the ‘National Youth Award’ by the Government of India in 1993
- the ‘Indira Gandhi National Integration Award’ by the Government of Maharashtra in 1992 were recognitions for his lifetime's contribution.
- In 2010 he received the prestigious Padma Shri Award (social work) from the Government of India.
