= Gopal Mayekar =

Indian politician and writer (1934–2021)

Member of Parliament, Lok Sabha
- In office 1989–1991
- Preceded by: Shantaram Naik
- Succeeded by: Harish Zantye
- Constituency: North Goa

Member of the Goa Legislative Assembly
- In office 1967–1972
- Preceded by: Raghunath Tople
- Succeeded by: Pancar Raghuvir
- Constituency: Mapusa

Gopal Mayekar (1934 – 22 July 2021) was an Indian politician, writer, and a leader of Maharashtrawadi Gomantak Party. He was a member of 9th Lok Sabha from North Goa. He served as minister in Dayanand Bandodkar's ministry of Goa, Daman and Diu from 1967 to 1970. He received the Kala Academy Award for best poetry in 1987 for Swapnamegh. He died at the age of 87 on 22 July 2021.
