= Shantaram Naik =

Indian politician (1946–2018)

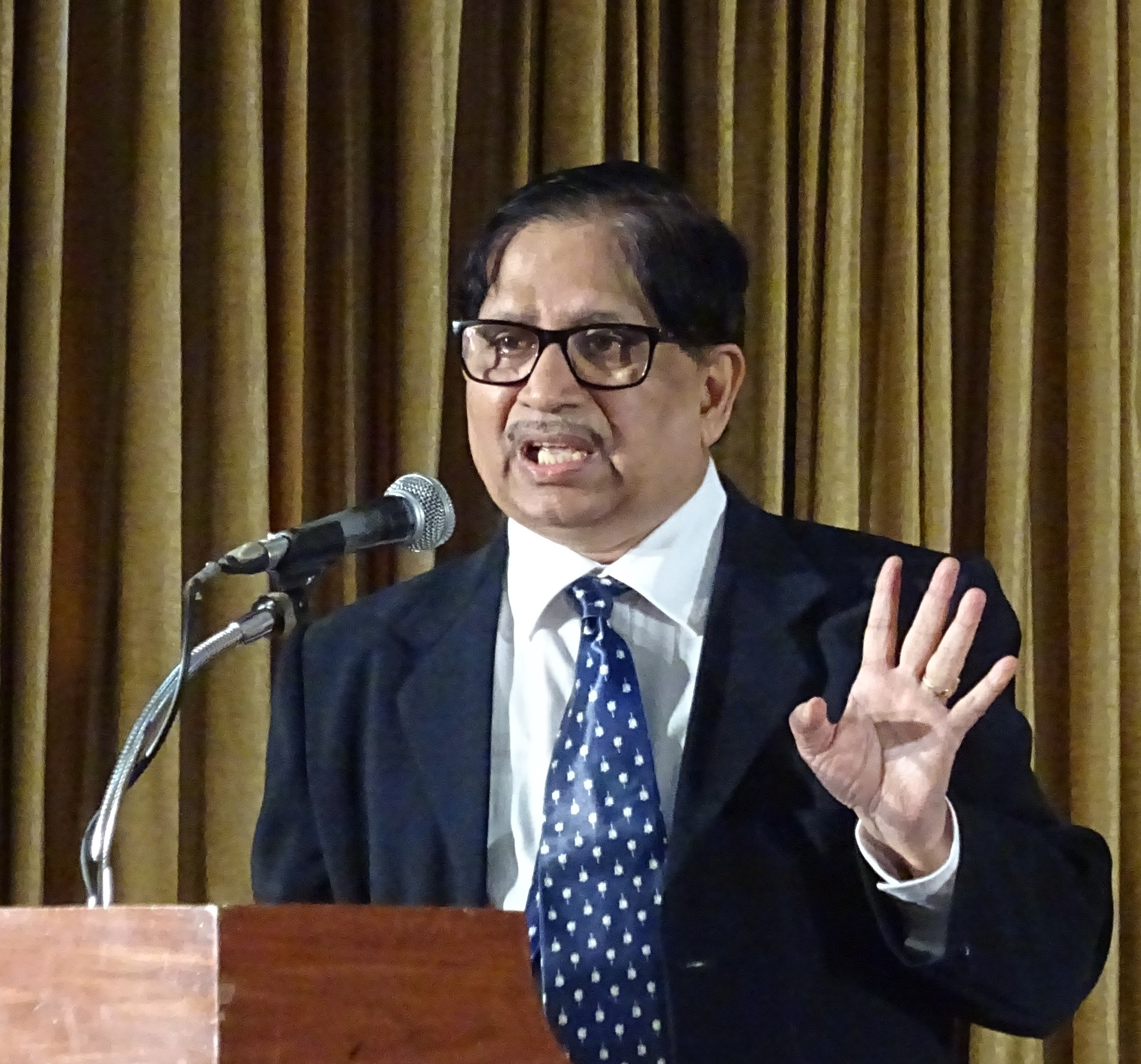
- Naik in 2016

President of the Goa Pradesh Congress Committee
- In office 8 July 2017 – 9 June 2018
- Preceded by: Luizinho Faleiro
- Succeeded by: Girish Chodankar

Member of Parliament Rajya Sabha for Goa
- In office 29 July 2005 – 28 July 2017
- Preceded by: Eduardo Faleiro
- Succeeded by: Vinay Dinu Tendulkar

Member of Parliament, Lok Sabha
- In office 1984–1989
- Preceded by: Sanyogita Rane
- Succeeded by: Gopal Mayekar
- Constituency: North Goa

Personal details
- Born: Shantaram Laxman Naik; 12 April 1946 Cuncolim, Goa, Portuguese India
- Died: 9 June 2018 (aged 72) Margao, Goa, India
- Party: Indian National Congress (since 1967)
- Spouse: Beena Naik (née Nikam)
- Children: 1
- Relatives: Ujjwal Nikam (brother-in-law)

Shantaram Laxman Naik (12 April 1946 – 9 June 2018) was an Indian lawyer and politician from Indian National Congress party and a former Member of the Parliament of India representing Goa in the Rajya Sabha. He was the President of the Goa Pradesh Congress Committee and the whip of the Indian National Congress in the Rajya Sabha.

== Early and personal life ==
Shantaram Naik was born on 12 April 1946 to Laxman and Sita Naik in Cuncolim village in then Portuguese India. He was initiated into politics as a student during the 1967 Assembly elections when he started putting up election campaign posters of the Indian National Congress in public places. He pursued a B.A. degree from the Parvatibai Chowgule College (then affiliated to the University of Mumbai and obtained a LL.B. degree from the Siddharth College of Law in Mumbai. Naik's participation in active politics started in 1972 and he started his law practice the same year. He was an agriculturist and lawyer by profession. He has served as a Special Public Prosecutor. Naik has also been the General Secretary of the Goa, Daman and Diu Pradesh Congress Committee.

He has served as a member of the Town and Country Planning Board, Goa; Committee on Personal Laws, Goa; Tenancy Committee, Goa and the State Khadi Board, Goa. He was elected the President of the South Goa Advocates' Association and the Vice President of the Goa, Daman and Diu Advocates' Association.

He married Beena Naik (née Nikam) on 11 May 1984. Beena is the sister of eminent public prosecutor Ujjwal Nikam. Shantaram and Beena have a son named Archit.

== Member of Lok Sabha ==
Shantaram Naik was elected to the 8th Lok Sabha in the 1984 general election from the North Goa constituency. As a Lok Sabha member, he introduced the highest number of Private member's bills in the 8th Lok Sabha. He also pursued the demand for statehood to Goa. During his term at the 8th Lok Sabha, Naik was a member of the Estimates Committee.

== Member of Rajya Sabha ==
Naik represented Goa in the Rajya Sabha for two terms.

== Death ==
He died on 9 June 2018 in Margao, Goa following a heart attack.
