= Sane Guruji =

Indian social activist (1899–1950)

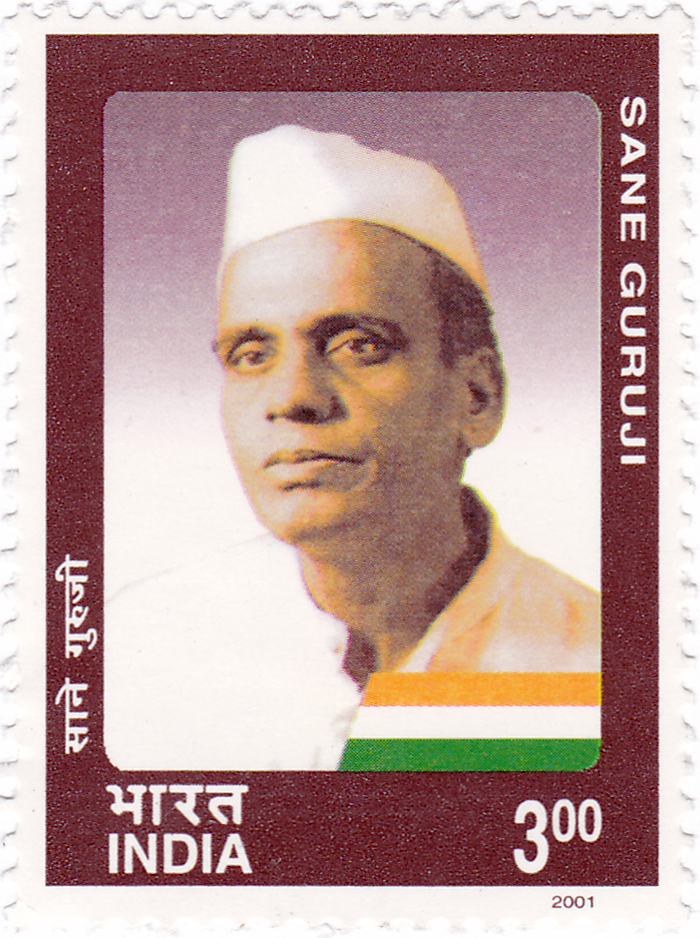
- Born: Pandurang Sadashiv Sane; 24 December 1899; Palgad, Bombay State, British India (present-day Dapoli Ratnagiri, Maharashtra, India)
- Died: 11 June 1950 (aged 50); Mumbai
- Occupations: Writer, teacher, social activist, freedom fighter
- Writing career
- Language: Marathi
- Notable work: Shyamchi Aai

Pandurang Sadashiv Sane (Marathi pronunciation: [paːɳɖuɾəŋɡ səd̪aːʃiʋ saːne] ; 24 December 1899 – 11 June 1950), also known as Sane Guruji (Guruji meaning "respected teacher") by his students and followers, was a Marathi author, teacher, social activist and freedom fighter from Maharashtra, India. His literature was aimed at educating children. After Gandhi's assassination, he became very upset. He then died due to overdose of his sleeping pills.

== Early life ==
Sane was born on 24 December 1899 in a Brahmin household of Sadashivrao and Yashodabai Sane in Palgad village near Dapoli town, Bombay State in British India (in present-day Ratnagiri district of the Konkan region of Maharashtra state). He was their third child and second son. His father, Sadashivrao, was a revenue collector traditionally referred to as a khot, who evaluated and collected village crops on behalf of the government, and was allowed to keep twenty-five percent of his collections as his own share. The family was relatively well off during Sane's early childhood, but their financial condition later deteriorated, leading to their house being confiscated by government authorities. Unable to face the trauma and hardship, Sane's mother Yashodabai died in 1917. His mother's death due to a lack of medical facilities as well as his inability to meet her at her deathbed would haunt Sane Guruji for the rest of his life.

== Education ==
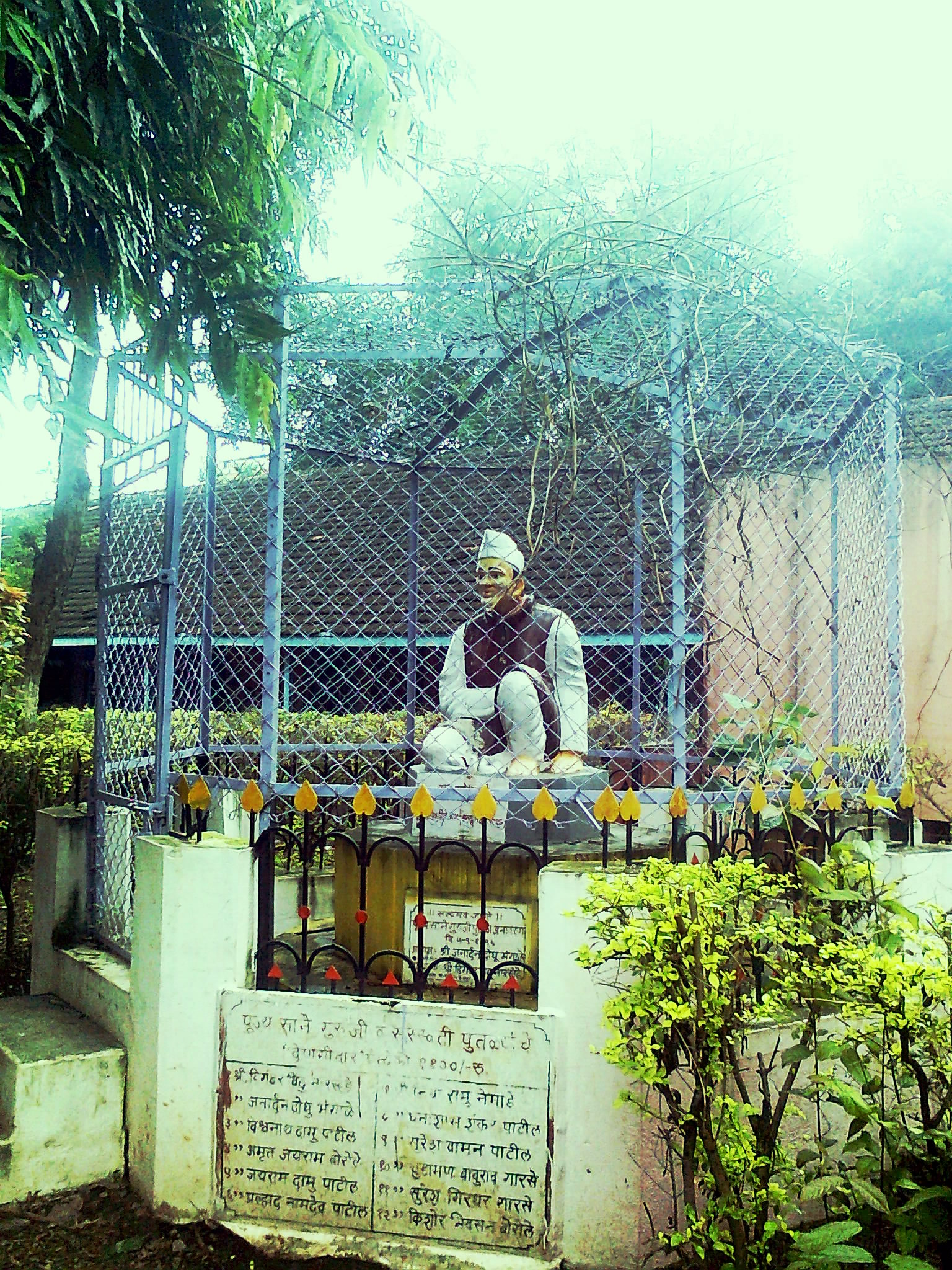
Pandurang Sadashiv Sane (Sane Guruji) statue in garden of ZP Boys' Primary School, Chinawal

Sane completed his primary education in the village of Dondaicha, in the Shindkheda taluka in Dhule district. After his primary education, he was sent to Pune to live with his maternal uncle for further education. However, he did not like his stay in Pune and returned to Palgadh to stay at a missionary school in Dapoli, about six miles from Palgad. While at Dapoli, he was quickly recognised as an intelligent student with good command over both the Marathi and Sanskrit languages. He was also interested in poetry.

While in school at Dapoli, the financial condition of his family deteriorated further and he could not afford to continue his education. Like his elder brother, he considered taking up a job to help with the family finances. However, on the recommendation of one of his friends, and with support from his parents, he enrolled at the Aundh Institution, which provided free education and food to poor students. Here at Aundh he suffered many hardships but continued his education. However, an epidemic of bubonic plague in Aundh led to all students being sent home.

Back in Palgad, one night he overheard his parents' conversation where his father expressed concern over his son's dedication to education. Enraged and hurt by his father's suspicion, he immediately traveled to Pune and enrolled as a student at the Nutan Marathi Vidyalaya. Life was not easy for Sane in Pune either, and he subsisted on limited meals. However, he continued to excel in academics and obtained his high school matriculation certificate in 1918. After high school, he enrolled for further education in New Poona College (now known as Sir Parshurambhau College). He obtained his B.A. and M.A. degrees there in Marathi and Sanskrit literature.

== Career ==
Sane's father Sadashivrao was a supporter of Lokmanya Tilak. However, after being imprisoned for a few days, he preferred to keep away from political matters. However, Sane Guruji's mother proved to be a great influence in his life. He graduated with a degree in Marathi and Sanskrit and earned a master's degree in philosophy, before opting for a teaching profession. Sane worked as the teacher in Pratap High School in Amalner town. He chose to teach in rural schools, forgoing a potentially larger salary he could have earned by teaching wealthier students. He also worked as a hostel warden. Sane was a gifted orator, captivating audiences with his impassioned speeches on civil rights and justice. While in school he published a magazine named Vidyarthi (Marathi: विद्यार्थी; vidyārthī) which became very popular among students. He inculcated moral values in the student community, amongst whom he was very popular. His teaching profession continued only for six years and thereafter he decided to dedicate his life for the Indian independence struggle.

== Participation in Indian independence movement ==
Sane resigned from his school job to join the Indian Independence Movement when Mahatma Gandhi started the Dandi March in 1930. He was imprisoned by the British authorities in the Dhule Jail for more than fifteen months for his work in the Civil Disobedience Movement. In 1932, Vinoba Bhave was in the same jail as Sane. Bhave delivered a series of lectures on the Bhagavad Gita each Sunday morning. Bhave's work Gītā Pravachane (Marathi: गीता प्रवचने) was an outcome of the notes Sane had made while imprisoned. During the period of 1930 to 1947, Sane Guruji participated in different agitations and was arrested on eight occasions and was imprisoned in the jails at Dhule, Trichinapally, Nasik, Yeravada, and Jalgaon for a total duration of six years and seven months in different jails. He also observed fast on seven occasions. Sane Guruji was imprisoned second time in the Trichnapalli Jail, where he learned Tamil and Bengali. He translated the ancient Tamil moral work of the Kural into Marathi. He recognised the importance of learning Indian languages, particularly in the context of the problem of national integration; and started the Antar Bharati movement. Antarbharati Anuvad Suvidha Kendra (Marathi: अंतरभारती अनुवाद सुविधा केन्द्र; Inter-Indian Translation Services Centre) and the Sane Guruji Rashtriya Smarak (Marathi: साने गुरुजी राष्ट्रीय स्मारक; Sane Guruji National Memorial) would continue this legacy.

Sane played a crucial role in the spread of the Indian National Congress presence in rural Maharashtra, particularly in Khandesh. He was actively involved in the organisation of the Faizpur Session of the Congress. He also participated in the Election Campaign of the Bombay Provincial Elections of 1936. He participated in the 1942 Quit India Movement and was imprisoned for 15 months for it. During this period he became closely associated with Congress socialists like Madhu Limaye.

== Working-class movement ==
In the late 1930s, Sane was part of a working-class movement in the East Khandesh District. He played a crucial role in organising the textile labour and peasants of Khandesh. During this period he was associated with communists such as S. A. Dange. However the Communist position to support the Second World War made him dissociate himself from the Communists. After independence he joined the Socialist party and he was closer to leaders like Madhu Limaye, N. G. Gore, and S.M. Joshi. Sane was a vehement critic of Hindu nationalist parties such as the Rashtriya Swayamsevak Sangh and their allies.

== Eradication of caste ==
In response to Mahatma Gandhi's promise to Babasaheb Ambedkar during Poona Pact that he will spend the rest of his life campaigning for the removal of untouchability, Sane took up the cause as well. To bring awareness on the issue of untouchability, Sane travelled throughout Maharashtra for around four months in 1947. The culmination of this tour was his fast at Pandharpur to open the Vitthal Temple for untouchables. The fast lasted 11 days from 1 May to 11 May 1947, and the doors of the Vitthal temple were ultimately opened for the untouchables.

== Death ==
In the post-independence period, Sane became increasingly disillusioned over the possibilities of eliminating inequality from Indian society. Moreover the Assassination of Mahatma Gandhi deeply affected him. His response to this tragedy was to fast for 21 days. Sane Guruji was upset very much after the independence of the country due to several reasons. He committed suicide on 11 June 1950 by overdosing on sleeping pills.

== Legacy ==
- Antar Bharati, the organization founded by Sane Guruji is also working for his dream of integrated India through several programmes particularly for Children and the youths in the country through a family exchange, National Integration Camps in parts of the country. The organization also publishes a monthly Hindi magazine titled "Antar Bharati".
- There is an annual gathering of Guruji's followers on 10 May to commemorate the opening of Pandharpur temple of Vithoba to the Dalit community.
- Sadhana – a Marathi magazine for intellectual thinking process founded and edited by Guruji continues to be publishing even today. It is published from Pune and has a good readership among Marathi speakers. Over the recent years, the magazine has been edited by notable persons like the late Yadunath Thatte, and the recently murdered Dr. Narendra Dabholkar.
- To commemorate the Birth Centenary of Guruji in 1999, the Sane Guruji Rashtriya Smarak Samiti was formed and it has developed a national memorial in the name of Sane Guruji at Vadghar in Mangaon, Raigad district in Maharashtra state on Konkan Railway route. The organisations believing in the ideology of Guruji include Rashtra Seva Dal, Antar Bharati, and Akhil Bharatiya Sane Guruji Kathamala. They have contributed to the memorial in their own way. The national memorial consists of a Camping site, Guest accommodation, Library and Reference wing with a provision for translation of the literary work in various Indian languages. It is being developed as a camping ground for students since 2001.
- The Indian Postal service issued a commemorative postage stamp in his honour in the year 2001.

== Literary works ==
Guruji wrote around 135 books and about 73 books have been published and almost all these books can be considered literature for children. His most well-known work in Marathi literature include Śhyamchi Aai which has been translated in almost all the Indian languages as well as in Japanese and English. The others include 'Bhāratiya Saṃskṛti' (Marathi: भारतीय संस्कृति; Indian Culture) and Patri- the collection of various songs and poems.

One of his books, 'Teen Muley', is a heart warming story of a group of three children and is considered classic and one of the best books written in Marathi.

He started a weekly journal named Sadhana (weekly) on 15 August 1948. This journal has been regularly published since then.

== See also ==
- List of translators
