= Sadhana (weekly) =

Indian political magazine

- Editor: Vinod Shirsath; Pandurang Sadashiv Sane (founding editor)
- Publisher: Hemant Naiknavre
- First issue: 15 August 1948
- Country: India
- Based in: Pune, Maharashtra
- Language: Marathi
- Website: http://www.weeklysadhana.in/

Sadhana (साधना) is a Socialist Marathi weekly publication that was established by Pandurang Sadashiv Sane (Sane Guruji), a leader of Rashtra Seva Dal on 15 August 1948. It was edited by Marathi writer Shankar Dattatraya Javdekar from 1950 to 1952. Yadunath Thatte became Sadhana's editor in 1956 and continued to lead it until 1982. G.P. Pradhan was the next editor of the weekly.

In the early 1970s the magazine provided a forum for voices from the Dalit Panther movement, who were revolting against the treatment of low castes in Indian society. Some of the Dalit writings published by the magazine were considered to be inflammatory by the middle class and even led to calls to ban the concerned issues. Sadhana brought the Dalit activists to the attention to the Marathi intelligentsia, and gave an impetus to the growing dalit movement.

The magazine served as a voice for Socialist thought in India and played a key role in the mass awakening during the 21-month-long Emergency Rule in India that was imposed in June 1975. In July 1976, the Government of India led by Prime Minister Indira Gandhi intimidated the weekly to stop publication by abusive use of national defence laws. The magazine soon reopened, after winning a landmark court case concerning press freedom in which Justice V.D. Tulzapurkar of the Bombay High Court along with Justice B.C. Gadgil quashed the government order seizing the assets of Sadhana Press, and struck down censorship orders as arbitrary.

== Editors ==
Editors	Tenure
Sane Guruji	15 August 1948 – 10 June 1950
P.H. Patwardhan and Shankar Dattatraya Javdekar	24 June 1950 – 10 December 1955
P.H. Patwardhan	17 December 1955 – 15 August 1956
Yadunath Thatte	25 August 1956 – 31 July 1965
Editorial Board: Yadunath Thatte, Vasant Bapat, Sadanand Varde	15 August 1965 - 17 January 1989
N.G. Gore	26 January 1981 – 12 January 1984
G.P. Pradhan and Vasant Bapat	23 January 1984 – 2 August 1997
Vasant Bapat, Sadanand Varde, Kumud Karkare	15 August 1997 – 30 April 1998
Narendra Dabholkar and Jayadev Dole	1 May 1998 – 17 October 1998
Narendra Dabholkar	25 October 1998 – 20 August 2013
Vinod Shirsath	20 August 2013 - till date
