= Ramchandra Chintaman Dhere =

Marathi writer

R. C. Dhere
- Born: July 21, 1930; Nigade, Mawal, Bombay State
- Died: July 1, 2016 (aged 85); Pune, Maharashtra
- Citizenship: Indian
- Occupations: Writer, researcher
- Known for: Research in Marathi Ethanography
- Children: 3, including Aruna Ramchandra Dhere
- Awards: Sahitya Akademi Award (1987); Campbell Gold Medal by The Asiatic Society of Mumbai; Tagore Award by Sangeet Natak Akademi; Punyabhushan Award (2010); Nine state awards

Academic background
- Education: Pune University; *PhD (1975); *D.Litt (1980)
- Thesis: Shtsthal: Ek Adhyan (1975)
- Doctoral advisor: Ramchandra Shankar Walimbe
- Website: Official Website

Ramchandra Chintaman Dhere (21 July 1930 – 1 July 2016) was a Marathi writer from Maharashtra, India.

== Early life ==
Dhere was born in the small village of Nigade in Pune district. He was orphaned at an early age of five. He studied at Municipal School, Pune, Poona English School, Poona Night School and graduated in 1966. During high school days he worked as a proof reader in the local press.

Dhere earned a PhD in Marathi in 1975. His doctoral thesis titled Shtsthal: Ek Adhyan was completed under the guidance of Ramchandra Shankar Walimbe. In 1980, he became the first person to obtain a Doctorate of Literature from Pune University.

== Career ==
From his childhood, Dhere was deeply influenced by folk-life and literature. He was drawn towards saint literature such as Warkari and Nath sects and started studying them.

Dhere wrote over 100 scholarly books, including some edited or translated works of others, on Marathi folk literature and culture, reconstruction of cultural history of places, religious sects in Maharashtra, and biographies of marathi saints. He also composed several poems and musical plays. Dhere lost almost all of his collection of old books in 1961 when the Panshet Dam broke flooding the city of Pune.

Dhere received a Sahitya Akademi Award in 1987 for his literary criticism Shri Vitthal: Ek MahaSamanvay. The highly influential book was translated to English by Anne Feldhaus and published by Oxford University Press in 2011.

== Death and legacy ==
Dhere died in Pune on 1 July 2016 at the age of 86 following prolonged illness. Writer Aruna Ramchandra Dhere is his daughter. In 2019, a library was built in Pune to preserve a collection of his books.

== Literary work ==
The following is a partial list of Dhere's works:

- Datta Sampradayacha Itihas (1958)
- Nath Sampradayacha Itihas (1959)
- Dakshinecha Lokdev Khandoba (1961)
- Marathi Loksanskrutiche Upasak (1964)
- Ramrajyachi Sphurtikendre (1966)
- Vividh (1967)
- Loksanskrutichi Kshitije (1971)
- Prachin Marathichya Nawadhara (1972)
- Shakti Pithancha Shodh (1973)
- Vividhdarshan (1975)
- Matangipatta (1976)
- Chakrapani (1976)
- Nawadarshan (1977)
- Lajjagauri (1978)
- Mharashtracha Dewhara (1978)
- Sant Sahtya Wa Lok Sahitya: Kahi Anubandha (1978)
- Shri Vitthal: Ek MahaSamanvay (1984)
- Shikhar Shinganapurcha Shambhu Mahadev (2002)
- Gangajali
- Agnyapatra
- Shodhashilpa
- Shree Tuljabhavani
- Shree Anandnayaki
- Lokdevatanche Vishva
- Sant, Lok Ani Abhidnyan
- Musalman Marathi Santkavi
- Bhartiya Rangbhumichya Shodhat
- Lokasahitya: Shodh Ani Samiksha
- Trividha
