= Mundkar Act =

1975 landowners' legislation in Goa, India

The Goa, Daman and Diu Mundkars (Protection from Eviction) Act, 1975, commonly referred to as the Mundkar Act, refers to a legal framework governing the relationship between landowners (referred to as Bhatkars) and residents (referred to as Mundkars) in Goa, India. Originally a law under Portuguese colonial administration, the law was updated after the Indian annexation of Goa, resulting in the passing of a legislative act in 1975. This act aimed to protect Mundkars from eviction and provide them a mechanism for house ownership.

== History ==
Prior to the Indian annexation of Goa in 1961, regulations regarding Mundkars were established by the Portuguese government through a decree enacted on 24 August 1910. This framework was later expanded by the implementation of the law titled Lei de Mundcarato (Legislative Diploma No. 1952), which comprised a total of 14 regulations and was put into effect via an official order by the Governor General of the Estado da Índia.

Following the freedom of Goa, the Government of Goa updated this law. In 1971, a new act was implemented to provide legal protection to Mundkars, agricultural labourers, and rural artisans within Goa, Daman and Diu. This 1971 statute kept the core tenets of the preceding Portuguese rules largely intact without major modifications.

To definitively address the evolving social structure and conditions of Goa, the government passed a comprehensive new Mundkar Act in 1975. Coming into force on 12 March 1976, this new legislation repealed both the original Portuguese regulations and the 1971 Act. The 1975 Act is structured into four distinct sections.

== Core definitions ==
The first section of the 1975 Act specifies the definitions of the primary entities and terms utilized throughout the legislation:

- Mundkar: A person who resides permanently on a landlord's property with the explicit or implied consent of the landlord. This designation extends to include the individual's entire household. The law stipulates that a Mundkar cannot be legally compelled to perform work or service for the landlord. Furthermore, individuals placed on a property by a landlord strictly to perform labor or act as a supervisor on a salaried or leasehold basis do not qualify as Mundkars.
- Bhatkar: The owner of the land upon which a Mundkar's house is built. Under the Act, joint Hindu families, comunidades, temples, churches, mosques, and other religious or charitable institutions can be categorized as Bhatkars. However, this law does not apply to properties whose ownership rights are held by the government, municipalities, gram panchayats, Provedoria, or similar local administrative bodies.
- Mundkar's house: The definition of the residential area varies based on local administrative boundaries, allowing the Mundkar to select one of two options:
  1. Gram panchayat areas: The land occupied by the house structure plus a surrounding boundary extending 5 meters from each wall, OR a total land area of 300 square meters inclusive of the house.
  2. Municipal areas: The boundary is modified to an extension of 2 meters from each wall, OR a total land area of 200 square meters inclusive of the house.
- The legal definition of the house also encompasses associated utilitarian structures, including cattle sheds, pigsties, poultry coops, and any specialized space used for the Mundkar's livelihood or business. Additionally, it includes the traditional pathways utilized by household members to access public roads or water wells.

== Rights and protections ==
The second section of the Act outlines the specific protections, liberties, and structural limitations assigned to Mundkars:

- Inheritance and transfer rights: Following the death of a Mundkar, all associated legal rights are automatically transferred to their legal heirs. However, a Mundkar is explicitly prohibited from transferring or assigning their Mundkari status to another person's name during their lifetime.
- Protection from eviction: Landlords are prohibited from evicting a Mundkar from their home, overriding any existing mutual agreements, court decrees, judgments, or local customs. If a landlord threatens or attempts eviction, the Mundkar can formally apply to the Mamlatdar to obtain a protective order. In cases of forced physical eviction, the Mundkar must file an application for reinstatement within one year. If a landlord demolishes a house or a portion of it, the Mamlatdar can conduct an inquiry and order the landlord to provide an equivalent alternative dwelling.
- Basic amenities: Landlords possess no legal right to interfere with basic necessities, classified as customary easements, which include water, electricity, and access pathways. If a landlord infringes upon these necessities, the Mundkar can apply to the Mamlatdar for an inquiry within six months. In urgent or severe cases, the Mamlatdar is authorized to issue an immediate interim protective order against the landlord without conducting a prior inquiry.
- Structural alterations and usage: Mundkars maintain the freedom to repair, rebuild on the existing site, and modernize their homes, provided they do not expand the total land area. They are also legally entitled to secure independent water lines and electricity supplies. The property must be used primarily as a residence, though a portion may be used for business or work.
- Land transactions: The established rights of a Mundkar remain completely unaffected if the landlord decides to sell, mortgage, lease, exchange, or hand over ownership of the underlying land to a third party.
- Exceptional eviction and surrender: A landlord can apply to the Mamlatdar to evict a Mundkar under strictly defined exceptional conditions: 1) if the Mundkar attempts to transfer their rights to another person's name, or 2) if no member of the Mundkar's household resides continuously in the house for a period of two years. Alternatively, a Mundkar can voluntarily surrender their rights by submitting a written statement to the Mamlatdar.

== Purchase of house and financial concessions ==
Under the Act, a Mundkar has the right to purchase the house they occupy along with its surrounding area from the landlord, though they cannot be legally pressured into making such a purchase. To execute this right, the Mundkar must apply to the Mamlatdar. The purchase price is determined based on the market value as of 12 March 1976, subject to the following statutory concessions:

- A 20% discount on the purchase price is granted if the applicant is a farmer, labourer, or rural artisan.
- The Mundkar is permitted to pay the fixed property price in 10 equal annual installments.
- A 10% discount on the total cost is applied if the entire payment is made as a single lump sum.

To accommodate the economic conditions of the residents, the government provides loans at concessional interest rates and facilitates financial assistance through the Life Insurance Corporation (LIC) and other financial institutions. Once the settled price is successfully paid to the landlord, the Mamlatdar issues an official sale certificate, granting full ownership rights of the house and surrounding land to the Mundkar. Additionally, the house is legally protected from any civil court orders regarding attachment or forced sale.

== Dispute resolution and jurisdiction ==
The third and fourth sections of the Act establish the judicial procedures and administrative machinery for resolving conflicts:

- Exclusive jurisdiction: The authority to adjudicate all questions and disputes regarding Mundkar rights is exclusively assigned to the Mamlatdar Court. The government appoints a Mamlatdar in every taluka, alongside Joint Mamlatdars who are vested with equivalent powers. Civil courts hold no jurisdiction over Mundkar disputes. If a Mundkar-related issue arises during a civil court case, the civil judge is legally mandated to refer the matter to the Mamlatdar for a definitive ruling.
- Legal representation constraints: To ensure rapid dispute resolution and mitigate financial strain on the residents, advocates and lawyers are generally barred from participating in Mundkar court proceedings. However, the Mamlatdar may permit legal counsel if the applicant is illiterate, lacks understanding of the law, or if the case involves complex statutory questions.
- Appeals and revisions: Decisions passed by a Mamlatdar can be appealed or submitted for formal revision to higher-level administrative authorities. These appellate powers are held by the Goa State Deputy Collector, Collector, Additional Collector, and the Administrative Tribunal.
- Implementation rules: To enforce the statute effectively, the government framed the Goa, Daman and Diu (Protection from Eviction) Rules in 1975. These rules provide structural guidelines detailing the methods for filing applications, the specific factors the Mamlatdar must evaluate when determining landlord compensation, the management of installment payments, and the protocols for conducting inquiries and recording evidence. The Mamlatdar is explicitly empowered to take penal action against any party that fails to comply with a delivered judgment.

== Reception ==
Frederick Noronha of o Heraldo stated that the Mundkar Act was misused by those who were temporarily occupying a home (as caretakers etc.) to gain ownership of the home under this Act, since the actual owners had settled outside of Goa. This was also prevalent with smaller landlords.

== 2026 amendment ==
In January 2026, the Government of Goa introduced an amendment to the act, prohibiting the transfer of ownership of the land without prior approval from the mundkar.
