= Aruna Ramchandra Dhere =

Marathi writer

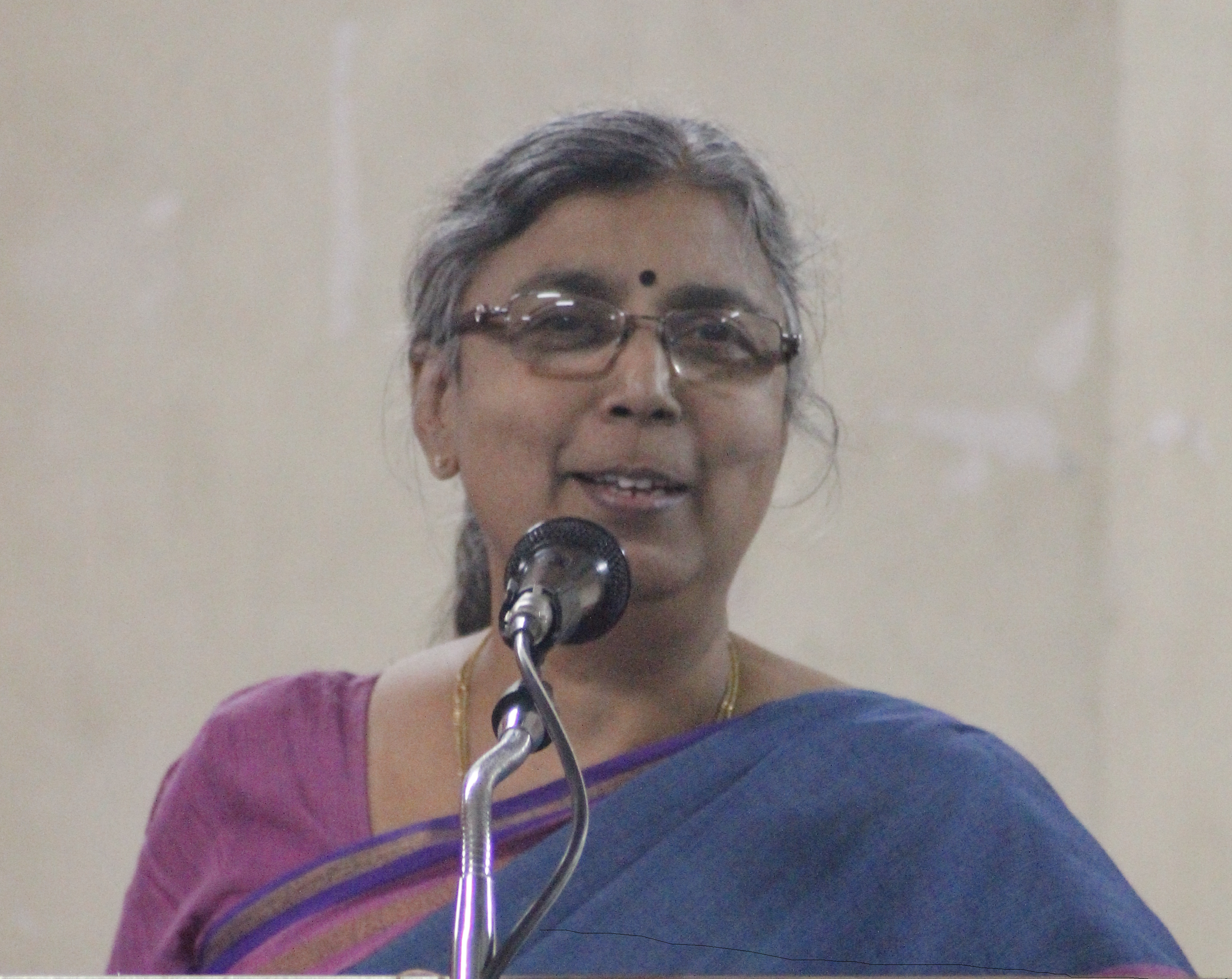
- Born: 2 February 1957 (age 69); Mumbai
- Education: Doctorate from Pune University
- Occupation: Writer
- Relatives: Varsha Ganjedragadkar

Aruna Ramchandra Dhere (born 2 February 1957) is a Marathi writer from Maharashtra, India. She was the President of the 92nd Akhil Bharatiya Marathi Sahitya Sammelan held at Yavatmal in 2019.

== Education ==
- B.A. Marathi, Gold medal winner, Pune University : 1977
- Bhartiya Vidya Padvika, Tilak Vidyapeeth : 1997
- M.A. Marathi, Gold medal winner, Pune University : 1979
- Ph.D., University of Pune : 1986 (Thesis : Archetypal criticism of post independence Marathi fiction.)

== Career ==
Aruna is the daughter of Ramchandra Chintamani Dhere. She completed a M.A and a Ph.D in Marathi literature from Pune University. She was a lecturer and producer in the Educational Media Research Center at Pune University during 1983-1988, and then had a short stint in the Maharashtra State Education Institution. Aruna Dhere has been a multi-disciplinary freelance writer and researcher in the field of Marathi literature, credited with : About 40 books covering a wide spectrum of'

- Personal essays, short stories and novels.
- Poetry.
- Monographs.
- Children's books.
- Television - screen plays and dialogues.

== Literary work ==
Starting around 1990, Dhere took up a full-time career as a writer. Her literary works include personal essays, short stories, novels, poems, travelogues, children’s stories, and books on sant literature, folk literature, and social history.

She has written on the lives especially of women from earlier times who rebelled against old traditions.

Some of her poems have been translated into other languages, including English.

She has written a few television screenplays and dialogues.

Dhere has edited over a dozen publications and magazines.

She has won about thirty awards from government bodies and literary associations for her literary work.

== Memberships ==
- Senate, University of Pune : 2003-2005
- Maharashtra Rajya Sahitya Sanskriti Mandal : 2005-till date
- State Loksahitya Samiti : 2006-till date
- Rajya Marathi Vikas Sanstha : 2006-till date

== Books ==
All books are available at this platform

The following is a partial list of Dhere's books:

वैचारिक

- अंधारातील दिवे Adharatil Dive
- उंच वाढलेल्या गवताखाली Unch vadhlelya gavatakhali
- उमदा लेखक, उमदा माणूस Umda lekhak, umda manus
- उर्वशी Urvashi
- कवितेच्या वाटेवर Kavitechya Vatevar
- काळोख आणि पाणी kalokh ani pani
- जाणिवा जाग्या होताना Janiva jagya hotana
- जावे जन्माकडे Jave janmakade
- त्यांची झेप त्यांचे अवकाश Tyanchi zep tyanche avkash
- पावसानंतरचं ऊन Pavsanantache un
- प्रकाशाचे गाणे Prakashache gane
- प्रतिष्ठेचा प्रश्न Pratishtecha prasn
- प्रेमातून प्रेमाकडे Prematun premakade
- महाद्वार Mahadwar
- लोक आणि अभिजात Lok ani abhijat
- लोकसंस्कृतीची रंगरूपे Loksanskrutichi rangrupe
- विवेक आणि विद्रोह Vivek ani vidroh
- डॉ. विश्राम रामजी घोले आणि त्यांचा परिवार Dr. VIshram ranji ghole ani tyancha parivar
- विस्मृतिचित्रे Vismrutichitre
- शाश्वताची शिदोरी Shashwtachi shidori
- शोध मराठीपणाचा (सुभाष केळकर यांच्याबरोबर सहलेखन-मुख्य लेखक- दिनकर गांगल) Shodh marathipanacha
- स्त्री आणि संस्कृती Stri ani sanskruti

कथासंग्रह

- अज्ञात झऱ्यावर Adnyat zaryavar
- काळोख आणि पाणी Kalokh ani pani
- कृष्णकिनारा Krushnkinara
- नागमंडल Nagmandal
- प्रेमातून प्रेमाकडे Prematun Premakade
- मन केले ग्वाही Man kele gwahi
- मनातलं आभाळ Manatle aabhal
- मैत्रेयी Maitreyi
- रूपोत्सव Rupotsav
- लावण्ययात्रा Lavanyyatra
- वेगळी माती, वेगळा वास Vegli mati, vegla vaas

कवितासंग्रह

- निरंजन Niranjan
- प्रारंभ Prarambh
- मंत्राक्षर Mantrakshar
- यक्षरात्र Yakshratra
- बंद अधरों से Band andhero se
- ऊनउतरणीवरून unutaranivarun

== Awards ==
Aruna Dhere has received dozens of Awards and Prizes from state government bodies. Among them :

- Kavi Keshavsut Prize (State Govt.)
- Balkavi Prize (State Govt.)
- Dr. Babasaheb Ambedkar Prize. (State Govt.)
- Kavi Kusumagraj Prize by Maharashtra Sahitya Parishad
- Sahitya Samrat N C Kelkar Prize by Kesari-Maratha Sanstha)
