= Yadunath Thatte =

Marathi journalist, editor and biographer

Yadunath Dattatray Thatte (Devanagari: यदुनाथ दत्तात्रय थत्ते; 5 October 1922 – 10 May 1998) was a Marathi journalist, editor, biographer, social worker and socialist leader from Maharashtra, India.

Born at Yeola in the Nashik district, Thatte was one of the prominent leaders of the Indian independence movement in Maharashtra. In 1942, he was sentenced to six months imprisonment for participating in the Quit India Movement.

Thatte was the editor of the Socialist weekly Sadhana (साधना) from 1956 to 1982, and a long-time activist in the Rashtra Seva Dal.

Besides biographies of Homi Bhabha, Niels Bohr, C. V. Raman, Earnest R. Ford, Satish Chandra Dasgupta, and Jagdish Chandra Basu, he wrote the following books:

- Mastakī Himālaya, Antaraṅgī Aṅgāra (1990)
- Cār Pharār (1990)
- Phulatā Nikhārā (1980)
- Sadānand (1978)
- Sarahadda Gāndhī (1969)
- Āpalā Māna, Āpalā Abhimāna (1966)
- Akshayapātra (1962)
- Gahina
