= Yeola =

Town in Maharashtra, India

Yeola Yevla
- Town
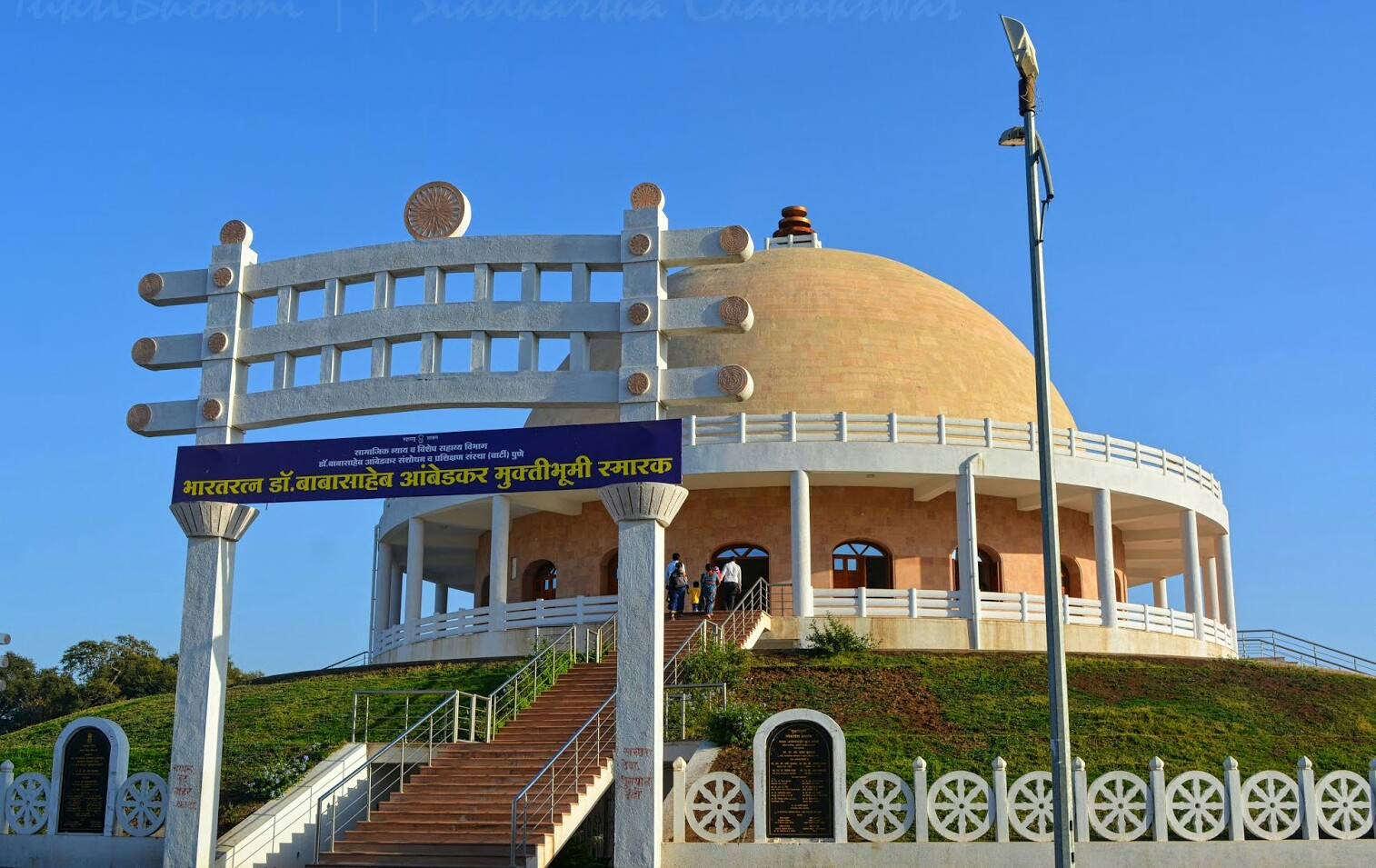
- Bharatratna Dr. Babasaheb Ambedkar Mooktibhoomi Smarak at Yeola

- Location in Maharashtra, India
- Coordinates: 20.042°N 74.489°E
- Country: India
- State: Maharashtra
- District: Nashik
- Founder: Raghuji Baba Shinde

Population (2011)
  - Total: 49,826
- Demonym: Yeolekar

Languages
  - Official: Marathi
- Time zone: UTC+5:30 (IST)

Yeola (Marathi pronunciation: [jeːʋlaː]), also called Yevla or Yewala, is a town, a municipal council, and a taluka headquarters in Nashik District in the Indian state of Maharashtra.

== Demographics ==
As of the 2011 census of India, Yeola, listed in the census as Yevla Municipal Council, had a population of 49,826, including 25,582 males and 24,244 females. Children aged 0-6 numbered 6,005, and the town had 39,801 literates.

== Geography ==
Yeola is 83 kilometres from Nasik on Nasik-Aurangabad Highway and 26 kilometres south of Manmad on the Manmad–Ahmednagar road. Yeola is 33 kilometres from Shirdi and is 260 kilometres northeast of Mumbai. It has a station on the Ahmednagar–Manmad rail route. Aurangabad Airport, Nasik/Ozar Airport, Shirdi Airport and Chhatrapati Shivaji International Airport are the nearest airports. It is 1149 km from Delhi. Notable villages in Yeola Taluka include Nagarsol.

== Notable people ==
- Tatya Tope
- Yadunath Thatte
- Swami Muktananda
- Lalita Pawar
- Chhagan Bhujbal

== See also ==
- Yeola (Vidhan Sabha constituency)
