= Gangadhar Gopal Gadgil =

Professor Gangadhar Gopal Gadgil
- Born: 25 August 1923; Bombay, Bombay Presidency, British India
- Died: 15 September 2008 (aged 85)
- Education: University of Mumbai
- Occupations: Writer & economist
- Employer(s): Sydenham College, NM College

Gangadhar Gopal Gadgil (25 August 1923 – 15 September 2008) was a Marathi writer & academic from Maharashtra, India. He was born in Mumbai in 1923. After receiving a master's degree in economics from the University of Mumbai, he worked as a professor of economics at Sydenham College and also a few other colleges in Mumbai. He was the first principal of well known Narsee Monjee College of Commerce and Economics from 1964-71. Gadgil was a prolific and multi-faceted writer, with published work in Economics, Literature, Biography, Literary Criticism and Travel Writing. The U.S. Library of Congress South Asian Literary Recordings Project has recordings of his reading from six of his books. They have also acquired sixty-five of his books for their collection.

Gadgil served as Vice-president and member of the General Council of the Sahitya Akademi, New Delhi, from 1988-93. He served as the President of the Mumbai Marathi Sahitya Sangh from 1983-1999.

== Literary accomplishments ==
Gadgil's keen intellect, his restlessness and his willingness to experiment led him to write in many different genres, both literary and discursive. Gadgil wrote novels, travelogues, plays, literary criticism, children's stories, and a large number of short stories. His work has been translated into several languages including Hindi, Gujarati, Urdu, Kannada, Malay and Turkish.

While he wrote in many genres, he is best known for revolutionizing the Marathi short story in the post-independence years, and creating, along with notables such as Mardhekar, a new tradition of literary realism in the Navkatha or new Marathi short story. His short stories depict the lives of ordinary middle-class Maharashtrian people with subtlety, sensitivity and psychological depth. His first short story, Priya ani Manjar was published in 1941. By the end of his life he had published more than 300 short stories in multiple volumes.

(Note: May need additional information about his contributions as a short story writer)

His first novella, Liliche Phool (1955) is an exploration of the themes of love, in all its forms, physical and emotional, in the life of a young actress. It is a novel that is haunting as it traces the choices she makes and the dilemmas she faces.

Durdamya, another major work by Gadgil, is a biographical novel about Lokmanya Bal Ganagdhar Tilak, a political leader in the struggle for Indian Independence. It is a depiction of Tilak as a man, along with the qualities that made him a visionary leader, rooting him in the political and social upheavals of that period. Durdamya also draws convincing portraits of other leaders in the freedom struggle such as Justice M. G. Ranade, Gopal Krishna Gokhale, Gopal Ganesh Agarkar and Mahatma Gandhi.

Gadgil had a deep and intense relationship with Mumbai, the city of his birth. He loved Mumbai, studied its history, and wrote biographical profiles of many notable historical figures such a Dadabhai Naoroji, Walchand Hirachand and Vishwanath Narayan Mandalik, which have been published as monographs. In Prarambh, a major and ambitious later historical novel, he approached the history of Mumbai through the figure of Jagannath Shankarshet, a towering public figure from the early 1800s. The biographical novel interweaves his life and works with the social, commercial and cultural evolution of the city in the 19th century, and incorporates as characters Indian and British figures such as Jamshedtjee Jeejeebhoy, Bhau Daji Lad, Governor Mountstuart Elphinstone, who helped shaped Mumbai into a modern metropolis.

Gadgil was also a humorist who wrote short stories, plays, and essays. His particular brand of humor and satire was "nirvish vinod" or non-poisonous humor. He approached his subjects with a wry yet warm humor, and sometimes ventured into the fantastical. His series of books about Bandu Abjabuddhe, his wife Snehalata, and his friend Nanu are beloved and continue to be performed as one-act plays in colleges and community events in Maharashtra. Crazy Bombay is a collection of essays, many written as a column for the Illustrated Weekly of India, and is a humorous tribute to the city he loves and to its denizens.

Children's stories and plays were another genre Gadgil explored. From the early one-act plays such as Mule Chor Pakadtat to his later series of modern fairy tales Ashrunche Jhale Hire, his books for children are a reflection of his playfulness as a writer.

Gadgil was awarded the Sahitya Akademi Award in 1996 for his autobiography Eka Mungiche Mahabharata. In it he traces his growth and evolution as a writer as much, if not more than, the events of his life. Gadgil's autobiography contains vivid portraits of writers and poets who were his contemporaries and friends.

== Expertise in economics ==
Gadgil was a champion of consumer rights. He was associated with Grahak Panchayat, Mumbai for a long time, and served for 15 years as the organization's president.

He wrote textbooks on Economics for college students. For some time, he served as an economic and financial advisor to Walchand Hirachand Group.

== Recognitions ==
- Abhiruchi Award (1949)
- Maharashtra State Award (1956, 1957, and 1960)
- N.C. Kelkar Award (1980) for Panyavarchi Akshare
- Presidency of Marathi Sahitya Sammelan, Raipur (Chhattisgad) (1981)
- R.S. Jog Award (1982) for Aajkalche Sahityik
- Sahitya Akademi Award for his autobiographical work Eka Mungiche Mahabharata (1996)
- Janasthan Puraskar for his total contribution to Marathi Literature (1997)
- Fellowship for creative writing from Rockefeller Foundation

== Works ==
The following is a partial list of Gadgil's books.

=== Literary Publications ===
- Manaschitre (मानसचित्रे) (1946)
- Kadu Ani Goad (कडू आणि गोड) (1948)
- Navya Wata (नव्या वाटा) (1950)
- Kabutare (कबुतरे) (1952)
- Talawatale Chandane (तलावातले चांदणे) (1954)
- Wegale Jag (वेगळे जग) (1958)
- Gunakar (गुणाकार) (1965)
- Athawan (आठवण) (1978)
- Uddhwasta Wishva (उद्ध्वस्त विश्व्व) (1982)
- Eka Mungiche Mahabharata (एका मुंगीचे महाभारत) (1992)
- Mumbai ani Mumbaikar (मुंबई आणि मुंबईकर)
- Bhopala (भोपळा)
- Bayko ani Dombal (बायको आणि डोंबलं)
- Bharari (भरारी)
- Asha Chatur Bahka (अशा चतुर बायका)
- Bugadi Majhi Sandli Ga (बुगडी माझी सांडली ग)
- Ekekichi Katha (एकेकीची कथा)
- Gandharvayug (गंधर्वयुग)
- Kajwa (काजवा)
- Hasarya Katha (हसर्‍या कथा)
- Mumbaichya Navalkatha (मुंबईच्या नवलकथा)
- Lambyachawdya Goshti (लंब्याचवड्या गोष्टी)
- Banduche Gupchup (बंडूचे गुपचुप)
- Snehalata Bandula Ameriket Nete (स्नेहलता बंडूला अमेरिकेत नेते)
- Bandu, Jagu ani Khatarnak Abdulla (बंडू, जगू आणि खतरनाक अब्दुल्ला)
- Bandu Bilandar Tharato (बंडू बिलंदर ठरतो)

=== Novels ===
- Liliche Phul (लिलीचे फूल) (1955)
- Durdamya (दुर्दम्य)
- Prarambh (प्रारंभ)

=== One Act and Full Length Plays ===
- Vedyancha Choukon (1952)
- Jyotsna ani Jyoti (1964)
- Pach Naatika (पाच नाटिका) (1953)
- Bandu, Nanu ani Gulabi Hatti (बंडू-नानू आणि गुलाबी हत्ती) (1962)
- Bandu Natak Karto (1961)

=== Humorous Essays ===
- Phirkya (1988)
- Babanche Kalingad and Mulicha Sweater (बाबांचं कलिंगड आणि मुलीचा स्वेटर) (1997)
- Amhi Aple Dhaddopant (आम्ही आपले धडधोप) (1982)
- Nivdak Firkya (गंगाधर गाडगीळांच्या निवडक फिरक्या)
- Sata Majale Hasyache (सात मजले हास्याचे) (1994)

=== Travelogues ===
- Gopuranchya Pradeshat (गोपुरांच्या प्रदेशांत) (1952)
- Sata Samudrapalikade (साता समुद्रापलीकडे) (1959)
- Naigarache Naadbramha (नायगाराचे नादब्रह्म)
- Himamaya Alaska (हिममय अलास्का)
- Chin: Ek Apurva Anubhav (चीन : एक अपूर्व अनुभव)

=== Literary Criticism ===
- Sahityatatle Maanadanda (साहित्यातले मानदंड)
- Khadak ani Pani (खड़क आणि पाणी) (1960)
- Panyawarhi Akshare (पाण्यावरची अक्षरे) (1978)
- Ajkalche Sahityik (1981)
- Pratibhechya Sahawasat (1985)
- Safar Bahurangi Raskikatechi (सफर बहुरंगी रसिकतेची) (1999)

=== Children's Literature ===
- Lakhoochi Rojnishi (1954)
- Apan Aple Thor Purush Honar (1957)
- Shahani Mule (1961)
- Mule Chor Pakadtat (1985)
- Ratne (1985)
- Pakyachi Gang (1985)

=== Literary Publications in English ===
- Crazy Bombay (1991)
- The Woman and Other Stories
- Husbands, Pumpkins and Other Stories (2001)
- Prarambh (2006)
- The Throttled Street
- The Faceless Evening (2017)

=== Textbooks on Economics ===
- Outline of Monetary Theory (1949)
