= Dnyaneshwar Agashe =

Indian businessman and cricketer (1942–2009)

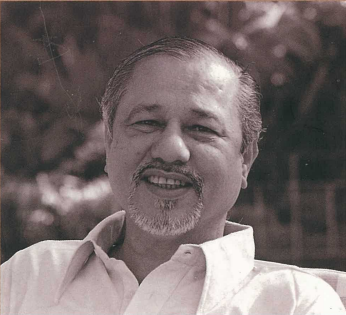
- Agashe in 2002

Vice president of the Board of Control for Cricket in India
- In office 1995–1999

Chairman of the Maharashtra Cricket Association
- In office 2003–2005
- Preceded by: Balasaheb Thorve
- Succeeded by: Ajay Shirke

Executive chairman of the Maharashtra Cricket Association
- In office 1989–2003

Managing director of Suvarna Sahakari Bank
- In office 22 September 1969 – 2 January 2009

Managing director of the Brihan Maharashtra Sugar Syndicate Ltd.
- In office 26 October 1978 – 2 January 2009
- Preceded by: Panditrao Agashe
- Succeeded by: Ashutosh Agashe

Joint managing director of the Brihan Maharashtra Sugar Syndicate Ltd.
- In office 1 July 1970 – 26 October 1978 Serving with Panditrao Agashe
- Preceded by: G. S. Valimbe
- Succeeded by: Himself (as sole managing director)

Chairman of the board of directors of the Brihan Maharashtra Sugar Syndicate Ltd.
- In office 16 February 1990 – 2 January 2009
- Preceded by: S. L. Limaye
- Succeeded by: Ashutosh Agashe

Personal details
- Born: 17 April 1942 Poona, Bombay Presidency, British India
- Died: 2 January 2009 (aged 66) Pune, India
- Spouse: Rekha Agashe (née Gogte) (m. 1967)
- Children: Mandar, Ashutosh, and Sheetal
- Parents: Chandrashekhar Agashe (father); Indirabai Agashe (mother)
- Education: Sir Parshurambhau College (BA); Brihan Maharashtra College of Commerce (BCom)
- Occupation: Industrialist; cricketer; cricket administrator; philanthropist
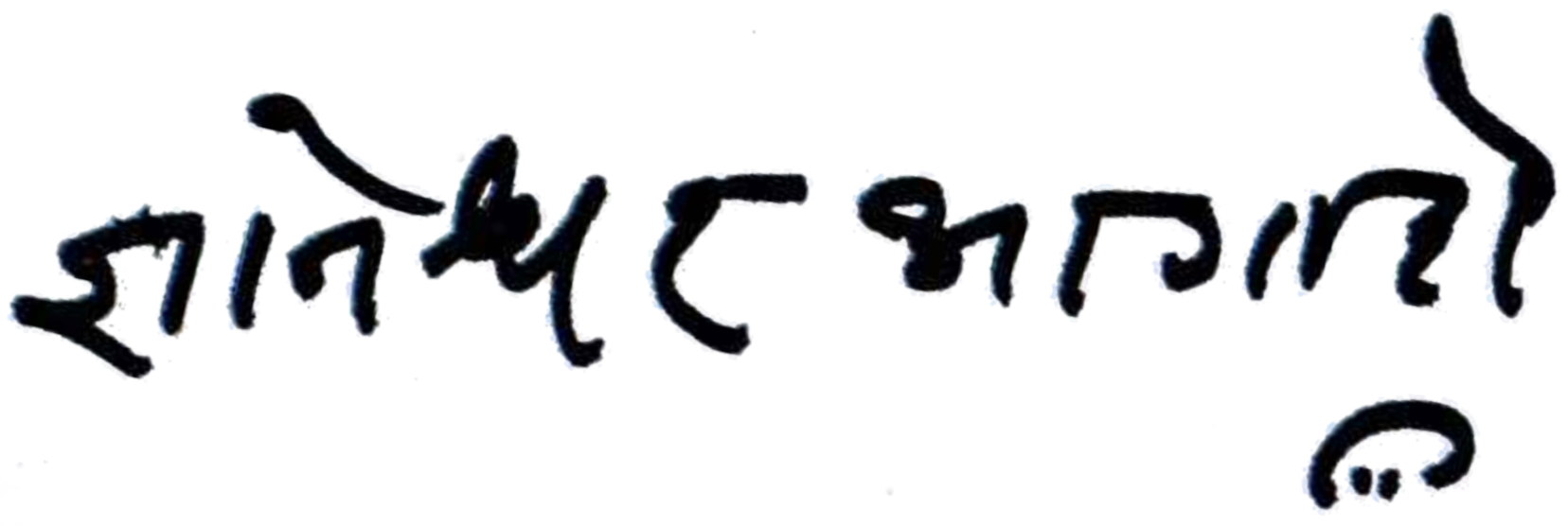
- Signature
- Cricket career

Cricket information
- Batting: Right-handed
- Role: Wicket-keeper

Domestic team information
- Years: Team
- 1962/63–1967/68: Maharashtra
- 1963/64: Maharashtra Governor's XI
- 1964/65: Indian Universities
- 1965/66: Vazir Sultan Tobacco Colts XI

Career statistics
Competition	First-class
Matches	13
Runs scored	341
Batting average	26.23
100s/50s	0/2
Top score	75
Catches/stumpings	33/6
- Source: ESPNcricinfo, 19 August 2016

Dnyaneshwar Chandrashekhar Agashe (Note: IAST: Jñāneśvara Candraśekhara Āgāśe. Agashe bore his father's name (Chandrashekhar) as a middle name as per the patronymic Marathi naming conventions, but he is widely remembered without his patronymic.) (17 April 1942 – 2 January 2009) was an Indian businessman, cricketer, cricket administrator, and philanthropist. He founded the Suvarna Sahakari Bank in 1969, and served as its managing director from its inception until his death. From 1970 to 1978, he served as the joint managing director of the Brihan Maharashtra Sugar Syndicate Ltd. with his brother, and then as the company's sole managing director from 1978 until his death.

A first-class cricketer in his youth, he played as a batsman for the Maharashtra cricket team at the Cooch Behar Trophy, as a wicket-keeper-batter for the West Zone cricket team, and as a wicket-keeper for the Indian Universities cricket team between 1955 and 1968. He then shifted to cricket administration, and was twice elected vice president of Board of Control for Cricket in India, serving his second and final term from 1995 to 1999. He unsuccessfully contested for the presidency of the Board twice; first in 1996 after Inderjit Singh Bindra's term ended, losing to Raj Singh Dungarpur; and again in 1997, losing once again to then-incumbent Dungarpur.

His later years were marred by controversy and scandal, with factionalism disputes at the Maharashtra Cricket Association between 2003 and 2005, that saw him resign his record seventh term as executive chairman, having served in that role since 1989. This was followed by judicial proceedings against him and his family, when scam allegations were lobbied against the Suvarna Sahakari Bank in 2008, just before his death.

Remembered for his philanthropy towards education in Pune, he served on the board of the Deccan Education Society, provided funding for the foundation of the Panditrao Agashe School, and further served as vice chair of the National Cricket Academy in Bangalore. A patron of the arts and of Marathi literature, he donated to the collections of the Raja Dinkar Kelkar Museum, and served as the publisher for numerous writers, poets, and playwrights in the Marathi language.

== Biography ==
=== Early life, education, and family: 1942–1967 ===
Agashe was born in Pune, Bombay Presidency on 17 April 1942, into a Chitpavan brahmin family of industrialist Chandrashekhar Agashe and wife Indirabai Agashe (née Dwarka Gokhale). His father was a member of the aristocratic Agashe gharana of the village of Mangdari in the Bhor State. He was the third youngest of nine siblings who survived to adulthood. He had an older brother, Panditrao Agashe, and an older sister, Shakuntala Karandikar. His fraternal twin, Mukta, died a few months after birth. His sisters nicknamed him Shirin, as a child.

Agashe's mother was the daughter of Narayan Gokhale VI from the aristocratic Gokhale gharana of Dharwad. She was a great niece of Bapu Gokhale, a Third Anglo-Maratha War general under Peshwa Baji Rao II of the Maratha Empire. Through her, Agashe was a distant relation of musician Ashutosh Phatak, historian Dinkar G. Kelkar, and scientist P. K. Kelkar.

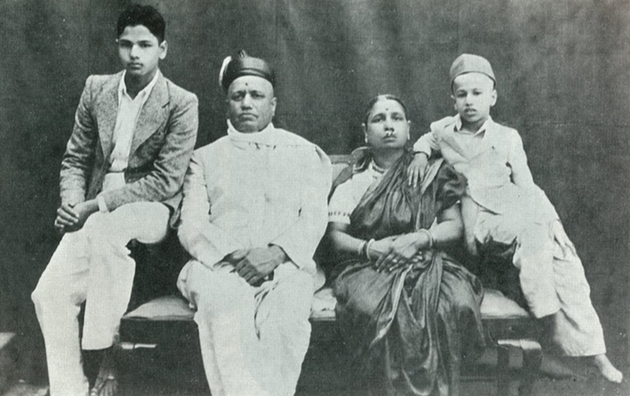
Agashe (far right), with his parents (centre), and his older brother (far left) in the 1950s.

Agashe grew up between Pune, Shreepur, and Mangdari. He and his siblings were in Mangdari during the anti-Brahmin riots that followed Gandhi's assassination in 1948. The family's wada, called Chausopi, along with the family's Ram temple was burned down. He began his schooling at the Nutan Marathi Vidyalaya in Pune. In the fifth grade, he transferred to the Deccan Education Society's Raman Baug High School in Pune. He graduated with a Bachelor of Arts degree from Sir Parshurambhau College in 1964. After briefly considering law at ILS Law College, he further graduated with a Bachelor of Commerce degree from Brihan Maharashtra College of Commerce.

Agashe married Rekha Gogte in 1967, a niece of industrialist B. M. Gogte. A member of the Gogte gharana of Belgaum, she was also a descendant of the aristocratic Latey (Bhagwat) family. Through her, Agashe was a relation of Kokuyo Camlin head Dilip Dandekar, and academic Jyoti Gogte. The couple had three children, sons Mandar and Ashutosh, and daughter Sheetal.

=== Career in cricket: 1955–1968 ===
While at Raman Baug High School, Agashe took an interest in cricket, field hockey, football, and badminton. Under the guidance of his school's sports coach Rambhau Lele, he began playing hockey as a center-forward. His batting style has been described as a right-hand bat.

Known for his unorthodox batting with lofted shots, Agashe was a part of his school's cricket team which won the Sethna Cup and the Pudumjee Shield against Shri Shivaji Preparatory Military School. Between 1955 and 1957, he was selected for the Pune district cricket team and then for the Maharashtra cricket team to play the Cooch Behar Trophy. He further sought training at the National Defense Academy before being selected as a wicket-keeper-batsman for the West Zone cricket team. While a West Zone player, his performance in the matches in Calcutta got him selected for the Indian Universities cricket team to tour Sri Lanka.

Between 1962 and 1968, Agashe played first-class cricket for the Maharashtra cricket team as a wicket-keeper-batsman, and scored two half-centuries in 13 matches. He played his best season in 1964–65 where he made his career-best 75, took ten catches and made two stumpings, and was credited for Maharashtra's victory against the Nari Contractor captained Gujarat cricket team in the 1964 season. His teammates at the time were Chandu Borde, Sadanand Mohol, and Hemant Kanitkar. During the same season, he was a wicket-keeper for the Indian universities team against the Sri Lankan cricket team.

=== Early career in business: 1966–1978 ===
Agashe's father had founded the Brihan Maharashtra Sugar Syndicate in 1934. After his father's death in 1956, the syndicate was headed by S. L. Limaye as chairman of the board of directors of the company from 1959 till 1990, while K. V. Champhekar took over as managing director of the company from 1957 to 1962, followed by G. S. Valimbe from 1963 to 1969, with Agashe joining the board of directors for the company in 1966, and launching new branches of the factory near Akluj.

In 1967, he was one of many public figures who had their astrological charts published by the Phal Jyotish Abhyas Mandal. He also joined the Maharashtra Cricket Association in 1969. On 22 September 1969, Agashe founded the Suvarna Sahakari Bank in Pune for the banking purposes of mainly middle-class families, and further published D. G. Kulkarni's historical fiction novel that same year. He was further credited as the printer of research memoirs on hydraulics from the Central Water and Power Research Station in Pune, that same year.

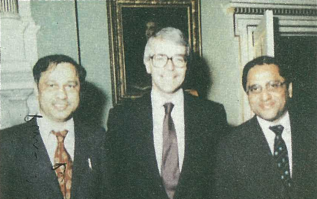
Agashe with John Major and Sanjay Dalmia.

Beginning in the 1970s, under Agashe and his brother, the syndicate manufactured liquor in Shreepur, Maharashtra, specialising in whisky production under its several flagship brands. In July 1970, Agashe and his brother became joint managing directors of the Brihan Maharashtra Sugar Syndicate. That same year, he was credited as the publisher and printer of V. H. Vadekar collection of short stories, and further established a newspaper called Rajas which had a monthly print circulation.

During the Maharashtra drought of 1972, Agashe and his brother lent their water stream on their Mangdari estate to the Bhor district for the construction of a tap water system for the village. In 1973, Agashe and his brother donated an exhibit named after their father to the Raja Dinkar Kelkar Museum. In 1974, he published Chintamani Tryambak Khanolkar's character sketch writings. In 1977, Agashe and his brother aided Shivrampant Damle in founding the Chandrashekhar Agashe College of Physical Education in honour of their father, and was elected the vice president of the Deccan Sugar Factory Association that same year.

=== Expanding roles in business, cricket administration, and philanthropy: 1978–1990 ===
In 1978, Agashe became the sole managing director of the Brihan Maharashtra Sugar Syndicate upon his brother's retirement from the office. In 1979, he was the credited printer for the book संस्कृतीच्या मळवाटा (lit. 'The Filth of Culture'), a critique of Hindu culture by C. P. Bhishikar. In 1983, he was the credited printer for M. A. Bhagwat's letters on the history of Marathi theatre at the Balmohan Vidyamandir, and by 1984, he was on the editorial board of the Solapur chapter of the Maharashtra Sahitya Parishad. By 1985, Agashe worked as a promoter for several cricket matches and tournaments within India, as well as in the United Kingdom and the Middle East. In January 1986, he interviewed S. L. Kirloskar for the Mahratta Chamber of Commerce, Industries and Agriculture.

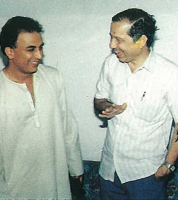
Agashe and Sunil Gavaskar.

Agashe donated to the Maharashtra Vidya Mandal after his brother Panditrao's death in November 1986, after whom the Panditrao Agashe School was named. He also founded the Chandrashekhar Agashe High School, Chandrashekhar Agashe Junior College and Indirabai Agashe High School on the family's estate in the town of Shreepur, Maharashtra. In 1987, Agashe was part of the inquiry made by Shankarrao Chavan about Sharad Pawar's foreign assets. That same year, during the 1987 Cricket World Cup, while serving as secretary for the Maharashtra Cricket Association, he predicted a low turn out for the match between Sri Lanka and England.

Agashe served as chairman to Kolhapur Steel, after the syndicate had begun work in metal printing under his brother in the early 1980s. He started a unit in Canada for Taj Rum by the late 1980s. He diversified the syndicate into pharmaceuticals, power generation, publication (with Mandar Printing Press), and real estate by the early 1990s. In November 1986, he was one of the shareholders named in the lawsuit against the Sakal Media Group filed by the heirs of Nanasaheb Parulekar. In 1987, he was one of the managers for the Indian cricket team's tour of the United Kingdom. In 1988, he also represented the interests of private sugar companies when the Government of Maharashtra promoted the nationalisation of sugar factories, and was serving as president of the Deccan Sugar Factory Association by that same year. In 1989, he was elected to the post of executive chairman for the Maharashtra Cricket Association. That same year, he was listed as a director for Sakal Papers.

=== Established businessman and cricket administrator: 1990–2003 ===
In 1990, Agashe took over as chairman of the board of directors for the syndicate upon the death of S. L. Limaye. In 1991, he attended the International Cricket Council meeting as vice-president of the BCCI, putting forth India's proposal to not renew the veto rights which were enjoyed by Australia and England as founding members of the council, and further proposing India's opposition to South Africa's participation in the 1992 Cricket World Cup, along with India's request to host the 1996 Cricket World Cup.

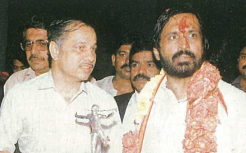
Agashe with Suresh Kalmadi.

In April 1992, Agashe chaired the meeting, in his role as chairman of the junior committee, which finalised the programme for the England under-19 cricket team visiting India, and for the India national under-19 cricket team visiting South Africa that year. In July of the same year, some sources reported that Agashe, along with board secretary C Nagaraj, voted against India's bid for hosting, or Pakistan’s bid for co-hosting, the 1996 Cricket World Cup at that year's ICC annual meeting. In August, it was announced that the BCCI had set up a panel, with Agashe as its chief, looking into hosting the 1995–1996 Cricket World Cup before submitting a formal bid in December 1992.

In September 1992, Agashe proposed several changes to the Ranji Trophy format for its points table, suggesting that the BCCI either follow the Australian system observed at the Sheffield Shield or to revert to the older format followed before the Ranji Trophy extended match durations to four days. He also suggested the removal of the bonus points during matches, recommending eight points be awarded outright for a win, dividing the number of runs scored by the number of overs bowled in case of a tie, and awarding no bonus points for batting or bowling, criticising that the bonus points system had not improved the quality of cricket in the league. He further suggested that the duration of matches be reduced to three days, and the matches be played on a limited overs basis, citing that the winners of the Ranji Trophy went on to play the Wills Trophy which followed the limited overs system. Agashe further stated that if his suggestions were implemented, other league trophies such as the Cooch Behar Trophy and Vijay Merchant Trophy would also need an update of their point systems.

In 1993, Agashe was invited to open the Deodhar Entrance to the Nehru Stadium, Pune. In 1994, he provided financial assistance to Société géologique de France for their research. During his tenure as chairman of the association in the early 1990s, he was twice elected as the vice president and once as the treasurer of the Board of Control for Cricket in India, being elected for his second term as vice president in 1995. In 1996, after Inderjit Singh Bindra's presidency ended, he contested for the presidency of the BCCI against Raj Singh Dungarpur, but lost by two votes. That same year, he was also the vice chairman of the finance committee of the Pakistan-India-Lanka Joint Management Committee (Pilcom), which had organised the 1996 World Cup. In 1997, he contested for the presidency of the BCCI once again, but lost to incumbent Dungarpur who was backed by a coalition of Bindra and Jagmohan Dalmiya. Sports journalist K. R. Wadhwaney regarded Agashe as a "gentleman-cricket player", who was a "soft-spoken and deserving official", and considered his losses in 1996 and 1997 as a criticism against a politics-heavy BCCI.

The late 1990s also saw Agashe diversify the syndicate and bank businesses to incorporate country liquor and banking software, alongside research into sugarcane for the syndicate. In 1996, he stepped down as managing director of the syndicate in favour of his son, Ashutosh. In December that same year, he served as the printer and publisher of the translation of the Dnyaneshwari into Hindi, authoring its foreword as the trustee of the Dnyaneshwar Sansthan in Alandi. By 1997, he would also serve as the chairman and managing director of Brihans Laboratories, the company which would go on to manufacture products for Brihans Natural Products. In 1998, he was also serving as a director on Baba Kalyani's Kalyani Group. That same year, he aided indologist Irina Glushkova and ethnologist Anne Feldhaus in their Oxford University Press publication on gender studies in Maharashtra, and was also one of the presenters of the man of the match at the Wills Trophy to Maurice Odumbe that year. In 1999, he further aided Glushkova and anthropologist Rajendra Vora in their Oxford University Press publication on kinship in Maharashtra.

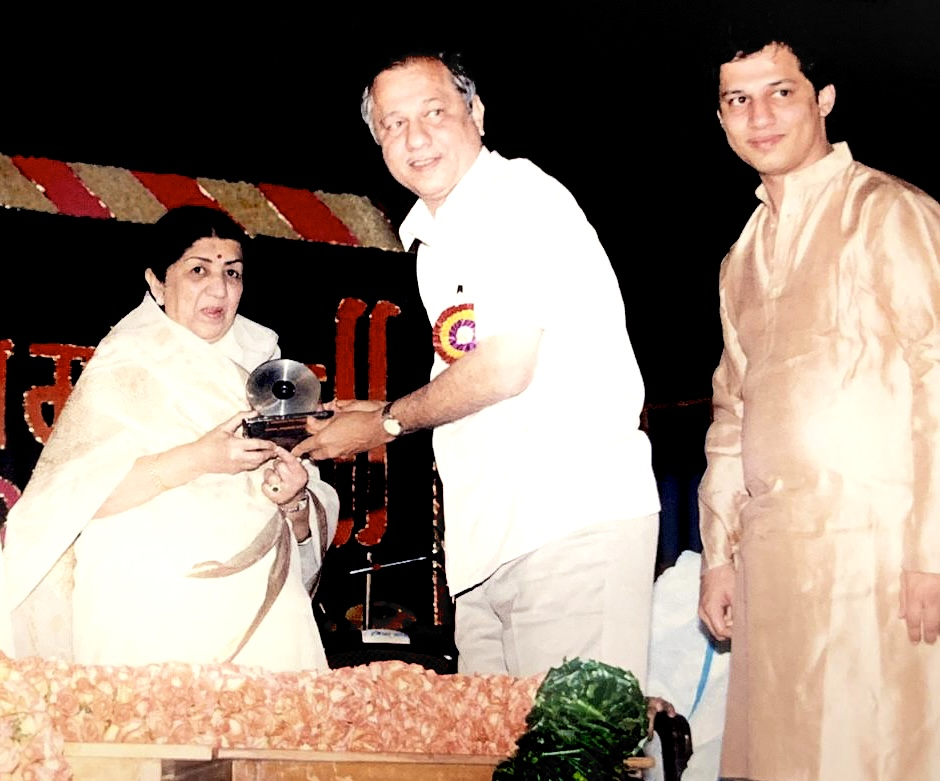
Agashe and his son Mandar Agashe felicitate Lata Mangeshkar.

By 2000, Agashe was also on the board of the Deccan Education Society, and was on the awards committee of the Shiv Chhatrapati Award. In his 2000 memoir, Narubhau Limaye wrote a dedication to Agashe. In September 2001, he also ran unsuccessfully for treasurer of the BCCI. In April 2002, a felicitation ceremony was held in Pune, in honour of Agashe's 60th birthday. To further mark the occasion, a motorcycle rally was organised on Jangali Maharaj Road, Pune, and a festschrift on him was published. The celebrations also included a cricket match played in his honour at the Nehru Stadium in Pune, a felicitation by Vijaysinh Mohite–Patil in Shreepur, and a reception by Sharad Pawar at the Ganesh Kala Kreeda Kendra. That same year, he was invited as a keynote speaker to the 75th Akhil Bharatiya Marathi Sahitya Sammelan under the presidency of Rajendra Banhatti. By March 2003, Agashe was among one of many celebrated Chitpavan brahmin businesspeople.

=== Maharashtra Cricket Association factionalism disputes: 2003–2006 ===
Agashe served a record seventh term as executive chairman of the Maharashtra Cricket Association, being elected in April 2003. He was also a voting member of the Mumbai Cricket Association, and served as the vice chair of the National Cricket Academy at that time. Amid factionalism disputes at the Maharashtra Cricket Association, a nine-member interim committee was formed in 2003. This committee was dissolved by January 2004, and Agashe was reinstated as chairman of the association.

In September 2004, amid continued disputes between Agashe and Ajay Shirke, the Bombay High Court appointed observers to the Maharashtra Cricket Association, one of them being B. G. Deshmukh. Later that same month, Agashe was denied participation in the annual general meeting of the Board of Control for Cricket in India by then board president Jagmohan Dalmiya, who cited the ongoing factional disputes in the Maharashtra Cricket Association as the reason for Agashe being disallowed to attend. Agashe was further denied his right to vote in that year's Board's presidential elections that same month by Dalmiya, which saw Sharad Pawar losing his candidacy for the board's presidency by one vote, that would have allegedly been Agashe's. Various sources at the time claimed that Agashe's actions, in delaying to arrive at the elections in Kolkata or taking immediate objection against his voting ban by Dalmiya, were perceived as deliberate by Pawar and his supporters.

In October 2004, Agashe moved court countermanding the elections, alleging that the absence of his vote ensured an unfair victory to Dalmiya's nominee, Ranbir Singh Mahendra. The Madras High Court declared a prima facie case in favour of the election results, but conceded that the elections were ultimately unfair, stating that Dalmiya had had no right to disqualify or prevent any board members from voting, even when the Bombay High Court-appointed observers had previously not given Agashe approval to vote. Agashe ultimately expressed satisfaction with the court's ruling. By late October, M. D. Zodge, the Deputy Charity Commissioner for Maharashtra, froze the workings of the Maharashtra Cricket Association's managing committee by court order.

Most of 2005 saw a continued power struggle between Agashe's and Shirke's factions at the Maharashtra Cricket Association. That year's Maharashtra Cricket Association election was in sight of reformed regulation scheme recommendations between the two parties, which was ultimately won by Shirke. Agashe had served a record seventh term as chairman at the time of his ousting from the position. Critics claimed that the court cases between the two parties were responsible for a lacklustre cricketing season in Pune that year. In August 2006, Agashe served as president through the Poona Young Cricketers' Hindu Gymkhana's liquor controversy, resigning the presidency in September of that year, after his third year as president of the club. He had been elected the club's president back in 2004.

=== Suvarna Sahakari Bank scam allegations: 2006–2009 ===
By September 2006, the Suvarna Sahakari Bank started having financial troubles. Various sources alleged that the bank's failure, along with the failure of the Brihan Maharashtra Sugar Syndicate in allegedly not being able to hire factory or farm workers at the time, was a result of Agashe's failure to get Pawar elected to the presidency of the Board of Control for Cricket in India back in 2004, in a then Nationalist Congress Party-controlled Maharashtra. Later that same month, the cooperative bank was put under moratorium by the Reserve Bank of India, after which Cosmos Bank announced plans to acquire the bank.

In June 2007, Hotel Ranjeet, a hotel owned by Agashe was auctioned off in order to pay off the loans due, which was followed by the sale of Agashe's majority stake in The Kolhapur Steel Ltd., a steel foundry in Kolhapur, to the Kirloskar Brothers in September 2007. In February 2008, following the order of moratorium, many of the bank's depositors held demonstrations at Agashe's Aundh residence and threatened criminal actions against the Agashe family. In May 2008, Agashe mortgaged personal property worth ₹200 crore in lieu of the recovery of the deposits worth ₹725 crore.

On 22 November 2008, Agashe, along with fourteen other board members, was taken into judicial custody, and the bank business was charged with a ₹436.74 crore scam allegation. The arrest warrant stated that the accused, along with six others, allegedly misused their rights and sanctioned loans mostly to firms owned by themselves and then defaulted the loans, thereby duping the bank's depositors. The judicial magistrate remanded Agashe and the fourteen other suspects to police custody, with provisions of medical assistance if required, citing the senior citizenship of a majority of the accused.

Following the arrests in late November 2008, the economic offences wing of the crime branch conducted a raid of Agashe's Aundh residence. The recovered evidence was used by the prosecution to further allege that Agashe and the others defendants had disbursed loans in a manner of conflict of interest as per Reserve Bank of India regulations, to which Agashe's defence counsel contended that the loans had been sanctioned by the bank's disbursement committee, a committee Agashe was not a member of. The defence also claimed that Agashe and his family had sold off various properties for the repayment of the loan, had extended their full cooperation with the police, and further submitted that the loan would be paid off after the bank's merger was settled. The defence also raised the issue of foul play, when the first information reporting of the allegations was not produced before the court three days after registering the case. The bail applications filed at the time for Agashe, his wife, and his sister were subsequently rejected.

=== Death, funeral, and legacy: 2009 ===
While in judicial custody, Agashe's health deteriorated and he was admitted to Sassoon Hospital on 22 December 2009, suffering from severe diabetes and gangrene, for which he had allegedly been previously denied medical assistance. He died on 2 January 2009, at the age of 66. He died in the ICU from a heart attack while being treated for diabetic complications.

On 4 January 2009, Agashe's body lay in state at his Shaniwar Peth residence and then the Shaniwar Peth branch of the Suvarna Sahakari Bank. His funeral which was attended by Suresh Kalmadi and Ashok Mohol among others. He was then cremated at Vaikunth crematorium later that morning. A condolence meet following Agashe's death was held at the Poona Young Cricketer's Hindu Gymkhana, at the Maharashtra Cricket Association, and his family's residence in Shaniwar Peth.

Agashe's son Ashutosh succeeded him as chairman of the board of directors and as managing director of the Brihan Maharashtra Sugar Syndicate. The bank's case continued after Agashe's death, with the bank being dissolved and merged with the Indian Overseas Bank in May 2009.

In 2015, Agashe's son, Ashutosh, conceived the Dnyaneshwar Agashe Trophy as the highest award of merit at the Poona Youth Club's annual cricket tournament, the PYC Premier League, in honour of Agashe. In his 2016 memoir, Madhav Apte remembered Agashe's business reputation fondly. In April 2022, the Brihan Maharashtra Sugar Syndicate reissued his 2002 festschrift in English. The translation from Marathi was done by Nandan Phadnis.

== Published works ==
=== Academic articles ===
- Sabade, B. R.; Gogte, J. J.; Agashe, D. C. (16 January 1986). "A study in entrepreneurship: Shri. S. L. Kirloskar". Mahratta Chamber of Commerce, Industries and Agriculture. Pune: Educational Media Research Centre, Savitribai Phule Pune University.

=== Book introduction ===
- Agashe, Dnyaneshwar (10 July 1992), चंद्रशेखर गोविंद आगाशे [Chandrashekhar Govind Agashe] (Preface) (in Marathi), Pune: Shri Prakashan, Introduction to Vishwasta (1992) by Shakuntala Karandikar, pages iii–v.
  - Agashe, Dnyaneshwar (10 July 1992), Chandrashekhar Govind Agashe (Preface), Pune, Maharashtra: Brihan Maharashtra Sugar Syndicate Ltd., Introduction to Vishwasta – The Trustee: The Life of Industrialist Chandrashekhar Agashe (2022) by Shakuntala Karandikar, translated by Nandan Phadnis, pages 6–7.

== Bibliography ==
- Agashe, Trupti; Agashe, Gopal. (2006). "मांगदरी घराणा" [The House of Mangdari]. In Wad, Mugdha (ed.). आगाशे कुलवृत्तांत [Genealogy of the Agashe Family] (Kulavruttanta) (in Marathi) (2nd ed.). Hyderabad: Surbhi Graphics. ISBN 978-1-5323-4500-5 – via Google Books.
- Agarwala, R. P., ed. (1977). Eastern Economist. Vol. 69. New Delhi: R. P. Agarwala. ISSN 0012-8767. LCCN 84646789. OCLC 1567281 – via University of Michigan.
- Aggarwal, S. K. (1989). Media Credibility. New Delhi: Mittal Publications. ISBN 978-81-7099-157-1. LCCN 89905747. OCLC 1131387623 – via Google Books.
- Annual Report of the Registrar of Newspapers for India. New Delhi: Ministry of Information and Broadcasting, Press Registrar General of India. 1971. LCCN 2002207288. OCLC 5036921 – via University of Michigan.
- Annual Research Memoirs: Summary. Pune: Central Water and Power Research Station. 1969. LCCN 62004292. OCLC 2640318 – via University of Wisconsin - Madison.
- Apte, Madhav (2016). Khadpekar, Vinya (ed.). Daivāyattam (in Marathi). Pune: Rajhans Prakashan. ISBN 978-81-7434-946-0. LCCN 2016316154. OCLC 1301976327 – via Stanford University.
- Barve, Ramesh; Vartak, Taraprakash; Belvalkar, Sharchandra, eds. (17 April 2002). पुत्र विश्वस्ताचा : गौरव ग्रंथ : ज्ञानेश्वर आगाशे षष्ट्यब्दीपूर्ती निमित्त [Putra Viśvastācā : A Festschrift : In honour of Dnyaneshwar Agashe's 60th Birth Anniversary] (Festschrift) (in Marathi) (1st ed.). Pune: Jñāneśvara Āgāśe Gaurava Samitī. ISBN 978-1-5323-4594-4. LCCN 2017322864. OCLC 992168227 – via University of Oxford.
- Bhagwat, Mahadev Anant (1983). इदं न मम : "बालमोहन" च्या रंगभूमीच्या काळात नातं घडवणाऱ्या नाट्यवेड्या विचक्षण रसिकाची पत्रे [This is not my alma mater: Letters from a theatre-loving, eccentric fan who formed a bond during the theatre days of Balmohan] (in Marathi) (1st ed.). Pune: Bāpūrāva Māne. LCCN 83905730. OCLC 11158244 – via University of Michigan.
- Bhishikar, C. P. (1979). संस्कृतीच्या मळवाटा [The Filth of Culture] (in Marathi). Pune: Bhāratīya Vicāra Sādhanā. LCCN 79904662. OCLC 6042625 – via University of Michigan.
- Booth, Lawrence, ed. (2015). "Agashe, Dnyaneshwar Chandrashekhar". The Wisden Archive of Cricketers' Lives, 2015. London: John Wisden & Company Ltd. ISBN 978-1-78539-426-3. OCLC 919344257 – via Google Books.
- Canadian Trade Index. Toronto: Canadian Manufacturers' Association. 1980. ISSN 0068-9904. LCCN 14021699. OCLC 2588466 – via University of Michigan.
- Dixit, M. S. (2003). आम्ही चित्पावन : कोकणस्थ [We are Chitpavan: Konkanstha] (in Marathi) (1st ed.). Pune: Nīlakaṇtha Prakāśana. LCCN 2003331088. OCLC 53360958 – via University of Michigan.
- Gadgil, Amarendra Laxman (1973). श्रीरामकोश [Śrīrāmakośa] (in Marathi). Vol. 1. Śrīrāmakośa Maṇḍaḷa. LCCN 74901968. OCLC 10799117 – via University of California.
- Glushkova, I. P.; Feldhaus, Anne, eds. (1998). House and Home in Maharashtra. New Delhi: Oxford University Press. ISBN 978-0-19-564303-9. LCCN 98902933. OCLC 231809108 – via Google Books.
- Glushkova, I. P.; Vora, Rajendra, eds. (1999). Home, Family and Kinship in Maharashtra. New Delhi: Oxford University Press. ISBN 978-0-19-564635-1. LCCN 99952768. OCLC 247317912 – via University of Michigan.
- Gupta, P. R., ed. (1997). Dairy India. New Delhi: P. R. Gupta. LCCN 83913311. OCLC 10568773 – via University of Chicago.
- Gurunathan, S. K., ed. (1966). Indian Cricket. Vol. 20. Madras: Kasturi & Sons Ltd. LCCN 51035757. OCLC 2666145 – via University of Virginia.
- Jakatdar, Shrikrishna Anant (1967). ज्योतिर्वैभव, डिरेकटोरी [Jyotirvaibhav Directory] (in Marathi). Pune: Phal Jyotish Abhyas Mandal Sanstha. LCCN sa68018230. OCLC 15270335 – via University of Michigan.
- Jamdar, Urmila, ed. (1996). ज्ञानेव्हारी [Dnyaneshwari] (in Hindi). Pune: Shri Dnyaneshwar Maharaj Sansthan – via Internet Archive.
- Joshi, Nilatai Krishna (1994). कृष्णा काठ ते इंद्रायणी घाट (in Marathi) (2nd ed.). Pune: Mandar Printers – via Internet Archive.
- Kamath, M. V. (1 January 1991). The Makings of a Millionaire: A Tribute to a Living Legend, Raosaheb B.M. Gogte, Industrialist, Philanthropist & Educationist. Mumbai: Jaico Publishing House. LCCN 91906125. OCLC 25633742 – via University of California.
- Karandikar, Shakuntala (10 July 1992). विश्वस्त [Viśvasta] (in Marathi) (1st ed.). Pune: Śrī Prakāśana. ISBN 9781532345012. LCCN 2017322865. OCLC 992168228 – via University of Oxford.
- Kelkar, Bhaskar; Kelkar, Govind; Kelkar, Yashwant (1993). "कासारवेल – पुणे – धुळे घराणा" [The House of Kasarvel – Pune – Dhule]. केळकर कुलवृत्तांत [Genealogy of the Kelkar Family] (Kulavruttanta) (in Marathi) (2nd ed.). Pune: Yashoda Typesetting. Archived from the original on 26 August 2022 – via Google Books.
- Khanolkar, C. T. (1974). दीपमाळा [Garland Lamp] (in Marathi) (1st ed.). Pune: Śrī Prakāśana. LCCN 77906454. OCLC 7273044 – via University of Michigan.
- Kisan World. Madras: Sakthi Sugars Limited. 1988. ISSN 0971-9229. LCCN sv88036214. OCLC 2253198 – via University of Virginia.
- Kothari's Economic and Industrial Guide of India. Madras: Kothari & Sons. 1978. LCCN 72904460. OCLC 1784174 – via University of Michigan.
- Kulkarni, Dattatray Gangadhar (1969). हैबती : शाहिरी ऐतिहासिक कादंबरी [Haibati: Imperial Historical Novel] (in Marathi) (1st ed.). Pune: Nalinī Prakāśana. LCCN 76910682. OCLC 30612404 – via University of Michigan.
- Maniyar, Vitthal (2005). विठ्ठलनाम (in Marathi) (4th ed.). Pune: Ameya Prakāśana. ISBN 978-81-86172-98-8. LCCN 2006310948. OCLC 65341543 – via University of Michigan.
- Mémoires de la Société géologique de France (in French). Société géologique de France. 1994. ISSN 0369-2027. LCCN 58054333. OCLC 6925640 – via University of Michigan.
- Moody's International Manual. Vol. 2. New York: Mergent FIS, Inc., Moody's Investors Service. 1998. ISSN 0278-3509. LCCN sf86090741. OCLC 7793423 – via University of Michigan.
- Outlook. Vol. 44. New Delhi: Hathway Investments Pvt Limited. 2004. LCCN 95906806. OCLC 33895826 – via Google Books.
- Pagès, Jean-Simon (1994). Actes du Premier Symposium international sur la protection du patrimoine géologique: Digne-les-Bains, 11–16 juin 1991 (in English and French). Société géologique de France. ISBN 978-2-85363-066-5. OCLC 1013218652 – via Google Books.
- Pathak, Gangadhar (1978). "पिरंदावण वाडी – तळेखाजण घराणा" [The House of Pirandavan Wadi – Talekhajan]. गोखले कुलवृत्तांत [Genealogy of the Gokhale Family] (Kulavruttanta) (in Marathi) (2nd ed.). Pune: Gokhale Kulavr̥ttānta Kāryakārī Maṇdaḷa. LCCN 81902590. OCLC 8113665 – via WorldCat.
- Patil, Anantrao (2000). नरुभाऊंच्या आठवणी [Memories of Narubhau] (in Marathi). Pune: Mīrā Prakāśana. LCCN 00403738. OCLC 45891493 – via University of Michigan.
- Pawar, Rajaram (2016). Socio-Economic Impact of Sugar Factories on Rural Areas of Solapur District: A Geographical Analysis. ISBN 978-1-365-21728-9 – via Google Books.
- Press in India. Vol. 33. New Delhi: Ministry of Information and Broadcasting, Press Registrar General of India. 1989. LCCN 2002207288. OCLC 5036921 – via University of Michigan.
- Puppala, Chandramohan (11 April 2019). No Ball. Pan Macmillan. ISBN 978-1-5290-2833-1. OCLC 1253564144 – via Google Books.
- Ranade, Sadashiv (1974). "मांगदरी घराणा" [The House of Mangdari]. चितपावन कौशिक गोत्री आगाशे कुलवृत्तांत [Genealogy of the Chitpavan Agashe Family belonging to the Kaushik Gotra] (Kulavruttanta) (in Marathi). Pustake miḷaṇyāce ṭhikāṇa. LCCN 74903020. OCLC 20388396 – via University of Michigan.
- Ranade, Sadashiv (1982). "जांभळी घराणा (पहिला)" [The First House of Jambli]. फाटक कुलवृत्तांत [Genealogy of the Phatak Family] (Kulavruttanta) (in Marathi) (2nd ed.). Pune: Phāṭaka Kula Samitī. LCCN 84900881. OCLC 20671450 – via Google Books.
- Report of the Deccan Education Society, Poona, for the Year... Deccan Education Society. 2000. LCCN sa65005216. OCLC 12114778 – via University of Illinois at Urbana-Champaign.
- Roy, Ram Narayan (1988). Sugar Industry in Darbhanga Division. New Delhi: Capital Publishing House. ISBN 978-81-85157-28-3. LCCN 88900492. OCLC 18420509 – via University of Michigan.
- Sharangpani, R. C. (1992). Fitness training in cricket. Bombay: Marine Sports Publishing Division. ISBN 978-81-85361-01-7. OCLC 957200114 – via Google Books.
- Singh, Gurdeep (1966). Cricket in Northern India. New Delhi: Cosmo Publications. LCCN sa67002290. OCLC 24195233 – via University of Michigan.
- Singh, Jasmer (1998). The Young Lions: Kenya's Cricketing Pride : Through the Eyes of the World Press. OCLC 50208511 – via Indiana University.
- The Maharashtra Co-operative Quarterly. Vol. 63. Bombay: Maharashtra State Co-operative Union. 1979. ISSN 0025-0430. LCCN sa63001001. OCLC 7121455 – via University of California.
- Tikekar, Aruna; Tilak, Abhay (2000). शहर पुणे : एका संस्कृती संचिता मागोवा [City of Pune: A Cultural Treasure Trove] (in Marathi). Vol. 2 (1st ed.). Niḷubhāū Limaye Phauṇḍeśana. LCCN 00402320. OCLC 45556373 – via University of Michigan.
- Vadekar, Vijay Hari (1970). नम म्हणे : कथा संग्रह [Humbly Speaking: A Collection of Stories] (in Marathi). Pune: Srī Prakāśana. LCCN 70913110. OCLC 19571287 – via University of Michigan.
- Wadhwaney, Kishin R. (2001). Cricket's Murky Underworld. New Delhi: Ajanta Books International. ISBN 978-81-202-0557-4. LCCN 2001436353. OCLC 49326678 – via University of Michigan.
- Wadhwaney, Kishin R. (2002). Indian Cricket Controversies. New Delhi: Ajanta Books International. ISBN 978-81-288-0113-6. LCCN 2002294180. OCLC 499848568 – via Google Books.
- Wadhwaney, Kishin R. (2005). Indian Cricket and Corruption (1st ed.). New Delhi: Siddharth Publications. ISBN 9788172201760. LCCN 2005323762. OCLC 61211645 – via University of Michigan.
- "बेळगाव घराणा (दुसरे)" [The Second House of Belgaum]. गोगटे कुलवृत्तांत [Genealogy of the Gogte Family] (Kulavruttanta) (in Marathi) (2nd ed.). Mumbai: Gogaṭe Kulamaṇḍala. 2006. LCCN 2012338796. OCLC 781940117 – via Google Books.
- महाराष्ट्र साहित्य पत्रिका [Maharashtra Literature Magazine] (in Marathi). Pune: Mahārāshṭra Sāhitya Parishada. 1984. LCCN sv92039931. OCLC 1644860 – via University of California.
- शारदा [Sharda] (in Sanskrit). Vol. 14. 1972. LCCN sf95072293. OCLC 1765022 – via University of California.
