= Ashutosh Agashe =

Indian businessman and former cricketer (born 1972)

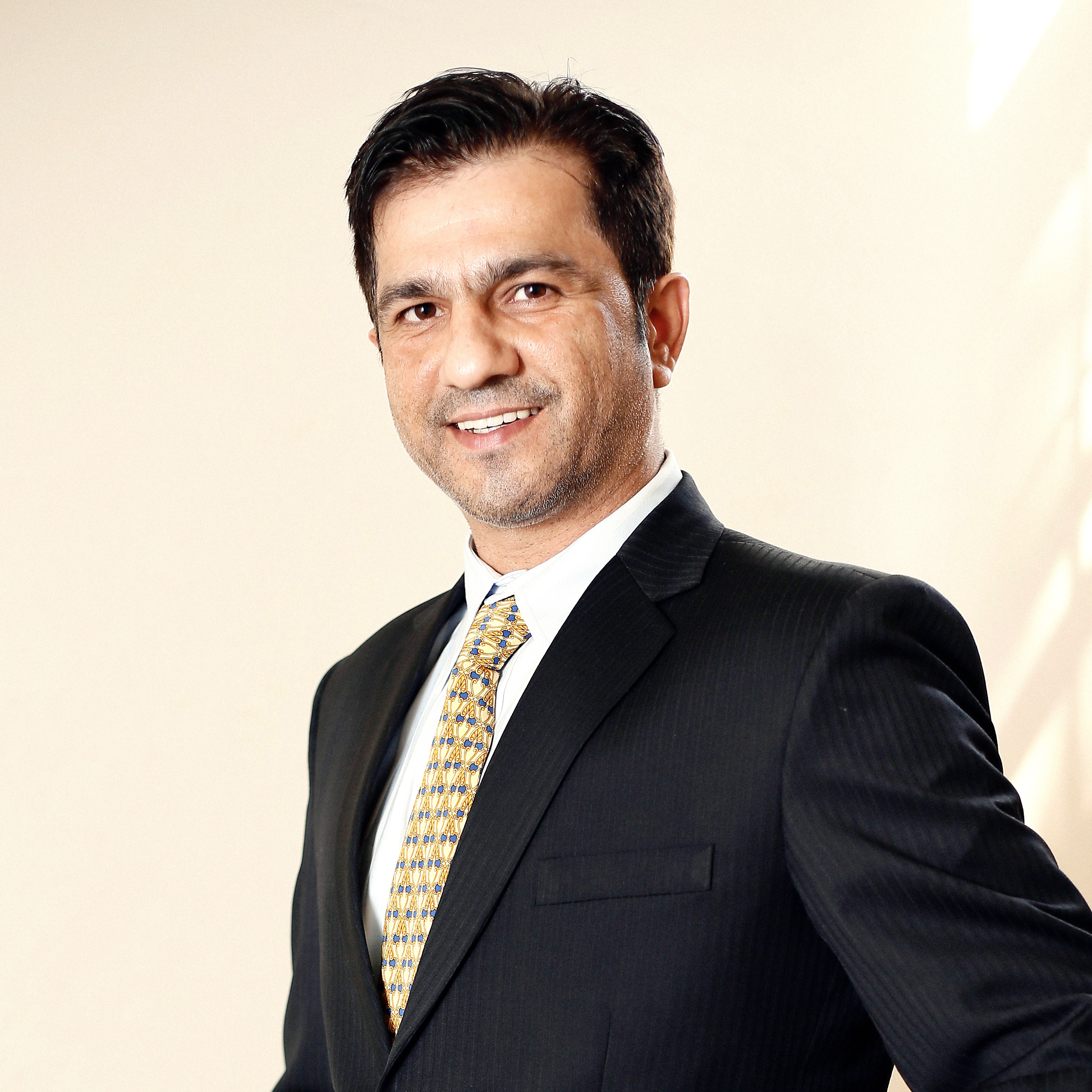
- Official portrait, 2015

Chairman and managing director of the Brihan Maharashtra Sugar Syndicate
- In office 3 August 2009 – Incumbent
- Preceded by: Dnyaneshwar Agashe

Personal details
- Born: 21 October 1972 (age 54) Pune, Maharashtra, India
- Spouse: Shalini Agashe (née Phadke) (m. 1997)
- Parents: Dnyaneshwar Agashe (father); Rekha Gogte (mother)
- Education: Brihan Maharashtra College of Commerce (B.Com)
- Occupation: Businessman; cricketer
- Cricket career

Cricket information
- Batting: Right-handed
- Bowling: Right-arm medium

Domestic team information
- Years: Team
- 1996/97–1999/00: Maharashtra

Career statistics
Competition	First-class	List A
Matches	5	11
Runs scored	9	26
Batting average	2.25	5.20
100s/50s	0/0	0/0
Top score	6	7
Balls bowled	588	535
Wickets	5	10
Bowling average	50.80	40.60
5 wickets in innings	0	0
10 wickets in match	0	0
Best bowling	3/20	2/26
Catches/stumpings	1/–	2/–
- Source: ESPNcricinfo, 19 August 2016

Ashutosh Dnyaneshwar Agashe (Note: IAST: Āśutoṣa Jñāneśvara Āgāśe. Agashe bears his father's name (Dnyaneshwar) as a middle name as per the patronymic Marathi naming conventions, but he is widely known without his patronymic.) (born 21 October 1972) is an Indian businessman and former cricketer. He has served as the chairman and managing director of the Brihan Maharashtra Sugar Syndicate Ltd. since 2009.

A former first-class and List A cricketer, he played in the Ranji Trophy for the Maharashtra cricket team from 1996 to 1999. In 1999, he also played in the Belfast Cricket League for Derry, and briefly served as a selector for the Maharashtra Cricket Association in 2003.

== Biography ==
=== Early life and family: 1972–1996 ===
Agashe was born in Pune, Maharashtra on 21 October 1972, into an aristocratic and entrepreneurial Chitpavan Brahmin family of industrialist Dnyaneshwar Agashe of the Agashe gharana of Mangdari, and his wife Rekha Gogte, of the Gogte gharana of Belgaum.

Through his father, Agashe is a grandson of Chandrashekhar Agashe, a nephew of Panditrao Agashe and Shakuntala Karandikar, a younger brother of Mandar Agashe, an older brother of Sheetal Agashe, of distant relation to Third Anglo-Maratha War general Bapu Gokhale, musician Ashutosh Phatak, historian Dinkar G. Kelkar, and scientist P. K. Kelkar.

Through his mother, Agashe is a great-nephew of B. M. Gogte, a first cousin to poet Rashmi Parekh, a descendant of the aristocratic Latey (Bhagwat) family, and a relation to Kokuyo Camlin head Dilip Dandekar, and academic Jyoti Gogte.

Agashe graduated with a B.Com degree from the Brihan Maharashtra College of Commerce. He represented his college in their cricket team. He married Shalini Phadke in 1997; she is a maternal granddaughter of the last ruler of the Kurundwad Junior princely state from the Patwardhan Dynasty.

=== Career in cricket: 1996–2000 ===
Beginning in 1996, he played first-class and List A cricket. His batting style has been described as a right-hand bat and his bowling style has been described as a right-arm medium.

From 1997 to 1999, Agashe represented his home state of Maharashtra as a member of the Maharashtra cricket team playing first-class cricket in the Ranji Trophy, having been selected for a four-day fixture for the Ranji Trophy by the Maharashtra Cricket Association in 1998, debuting as the team's captain against the Mumbai cricket team at the Wankhede Stadium in November 1999.

In 1999, Agashe further played in the Belfast Cricket League for Creevedonnell Cricket Club in Derry. He subsequently left List A cricket in 2000, having played since 1996. Remembered as one of the more prominent cricketers from Pune to play for the Maharashtra cricket team, and has been a life member of the Maharashtra Cricket Association.

=== Career in business: 2000–present ===
Beginning in 1994, Agashe was appointed a director at Brima Finance, before joining his father on the board of directors of the Brihan Maharashtra Sugar Syndicate Ltd. in 1996. In 1998, under the leadership of Agashe and his father, the syndicate began marketing ayurvedic medicines, health care products, and bulk raw materials, manufacturing food products and veterinary medicine, promoting ayurvedic skincare products made by its sister company, Brihans Natural Products in 2000, and manufacturing alcohol-based chemicals by 2002.

In September 2000, Agashe was appointed as a joint managing director of the syndicate. In April 2002, he contributed an essay titled अजातशत्रू (lit. 'One who has no enemies') to his father's festschrift. In 2003, he was made a selector at the Maharashtra Cricket Association, at the time, chaired by his father, which raised nepotism concerns and drew in criticism for the association. That same year, he supported the publication of a book about Mahavira and other Jain Tirthankaras by Shantilal Bhandari.

By 2004, Agashe was also looking after several operations of the Suvarna Sahakari Bank. That same year, he was part of his father's Maharashtra Cricket Association committee as a representative for the Club of Maharashtra, and worked as his father's aide during the controversial elections at the Board of Control for Cricket in India, when his father was not allowed to vote as vice president of the board due to alleged factionalism.

In 2005, under Agashe, the syndicate entered a partnership with Howling Wolves Wine Group of Australia which planned to set up a wine production base in India. At the time, he was joint managing director at the syndicate. Between 2004 and 2005, he was elected the chairman of Suvarna Sahakari Bank. and served as chairman when the bank was put under moratorium by the Reserve Bank of India in 2006. In 2007, he received the DSK Group Energy Award of 2007 for corporate implementation of energy efficiency improvement measures.

In 2008, Agashe was one of the directors implicated in Suvarna Sahakari Bank's alleged scam case. Him along with his parents, aunt and brother were taken under judicial custody, during which time his father died in January 2009. He was subsequently released on bail that same month. The bank's merger with the Indian Overseas Bank was finalised by the Reserve Bank of India in May 2009.

Since 2009, Agashe has been director at Agashe Brothers Financing Company, and since 2010, director at Baumgarten and Wallia. In August 2009, he was appointed chairman and managing director of the Brihan Maharashtra Sugar Syndicate. In 2015, he conceived the Dnyaneshwar Agashe Trophy as the highest award of merit at the Poona Young Cricketers Hindu Gymkhana's annual cricket tournament, the PYC Premier League, in honour of his father. In February 2019, he came out of retirement to participate in the Poona Club Premier League.

In May 2021, during the COVID-19 pandemic in India, Agashe donated oxygen concentrators to hospitals in Shreepur, Maharashtra. In July 2024, he owned a chess team for the chess league organised by the PYC Hindu Gymkhana, further owning a tennis team at the gymkhana's tennis tournament in December 2024, with that same team going on to play table tennis, tennis, and badminton in the gymkhana's racquet sport league in March 2025.

== Published works ==
=== Essays ===
- Agashe, Ashutosh (17 April 2002). "अजातशत्रू" [One who has no enemies]. In Barve, Ramesh; Vartak, Taraprakash; Belvalkar, Sharchandra (eds.). पुत्र विश्वस्ताचा : गौरव ग्रंथ : ज्ञानेश्वर आगाशे षष्ट्यब्दीपूर्ती निमित्त [Putra Viśvastācā : A Festschrift : In honour of Dnyaneshwar Agashe's 60th Birth Anniversary] (Festschrift) (in Marathi) (1st ed.). Pune: Jñāneśvara Āgāśe Gaurava Samitī. pp. 1–2. ISBN 978-1-5323-4594-4. LCCN 2017322864. OCLC 992168227 – via University of Oxford.
  - Agashe, Ashutosh (17 April 2022). "Ajaatshatru: A Person with No Enemies". In Belvalkar, Sharatchandra; Vartak, Taraprakash; Barve, Ramesh (eds.). Putra Vishwastacha: A Festschrift to Dnyaneshwar Agashe. Translated by Phadnis, Nandan. Compiled by Agashe, Aditya (2nd ed.). Pune, Maharashtra: The Brihan Maharashtra Sugar Syndicate Ltd. pp. 2–3. ISBN 9780578292250. LCCN 2021276707. OCLC 1325123469 – via Google Books.

== Bibliography ==
- Agashe, Trupti; Agashe, Gopal. (2006). "मांगदरी घराणा" [The House of Mangdari]. In Wad, Mugdha (ed.). आगाशे कुलवृत्तांत [Genealogy of the Agashe Family] (Kulavruttanta) (in Marathi) (2nd ed.). Hyderabad: Surbhi Graphics. ISBN 978-1-5323-4500-5 – via Google Books.
- Barve, D. K. (1982). सागरमेघ: बा. म. ऊर्फ रावसाहेब गोगटे यांचा भैतिक व आत्मिक आविष्कार [Sagarmegh: The Physical and Spiritual Invention of B. M. "Raosaheb" Gogte] (in Marathi). Mumbai: Bombay Book Ḍepot. LCCN 82905037. OCLC 12024875 – via University of Michigan.
- Barve, Ramesh; Vartak, Taraprakash; Belvalkar, Sharchandra, eds. (17 April 2002). पुत्र विश्वस्ताचा : गौरव ग्रंथ : ज्ञानेश्वर आगाशे षष्ट्यब्दीपूर्ती निमित्त [Putra Viśvastācā : A Festschrift : In honour of Dnyaneshwar Agashe's 60th Birth Anniversary] (Festschrift) (in Marathi) (1st ed.). Pune: Jñāneśvara Āgāśe Gaurava Samitī. ISBN 978-1-5323-4594-4. LCCN 2017322864. OCLC 992168227 – via University of Oxford.
- Belvalkar, Sharatchandra; Vartak, Taraprakash; Barve, Ramesh, eds. (17 April 2022). Putra Vishwastacha: A Festschrift to Dnyaneshwar Agashe. Translated by Phadnis, Nandan. Compiled by Agashe, Aditya (2nd ed.). Pune, Maharashtra: The Brihan Maharashtra Sugar Syndicate Ltd. ISBN 9780578292250. LCCN 2021276707. OCLC 1325123469 – via Google Books.
- Bhandari, Shantilal (2003). Mahanmaṅgala (in Marathi) (1st ed.). Pune: Cirāyu Prakāśana. ISBN 978-81-85282-04-6. LCCN 2003328260. OCLC 55078046 – via University of Michigan.
- India Today. Vol. 8. New Delhi: Living Media India. 2003. ISSN 0254-8399. LCCN 2006310900. OCLC 2675526 – via University of Virginia.
- India Today International. Vol. 2. New Delhi: Living Media International Limited. 2003. ISSN 1544-6689. LCCN 2002252067. OCLC 48896378 – via University of Michigan.
- Kamath, M. V. (1 January 1991). The Makings of a Millionaire: A Tribute to a Living Legend, Raosaheb B.M. Gogte, Industrialist, Philanthropist & Educationist. Mumbai: Jaico Publishing House. LCCN 91906125. OCLC 25633742 – via University of California.
- Karandikar, Shakuntala (10 July 1992). विश्वस्त [Viśvasta] (in Marathi) (1st ed.). Pune: Śrī Prakāśana. ISBN 9781532345012. LCCN 2017322865. OCLC 992168228 – via University of Oxford.
- Karandikar, Shakuntala (14 February 2022). Agashe, Aditya (ed.). Vishwasta – The Trustee: The Life of Industrialist Chandrashekhar Agashe. Translated by Phadnis, Nandan (2nd ed.). Pune: The Brihan Maharashtra Sugar Syndicate Ltd. ISBN 9780578355863. LCCN 2021276641. OCLC 1310118266 – via Google Books.
- Kelkar, Bhaskar; Kelkar, Govind; Kelkar, Yashwant (1993). "कासारवेल – पुणे – धुळे घराणा" [The House of Kasarvel – Pune – Dhule]. केळकर कुलवृत्तांत [Genealogy of the Kelkar Family] (Kulavruttanta) (in Marathi) (2nd ed.). Pune: Yashoda Typesetting. Archived from the original on 26 August 2022.
- Panda, H. (7 February 2002). Handbook On Chemical Industries (Alcohol Based). Asia Pacific Business Press Inc. ISBN 978-81-7833-067-9. OCLC 191026377 – via Google Books.
- Pathak, Gangadhar (1978). "पिरंदावण वाडी – तळेखाजण घराणा" [The House of Pirandavan Wadi – Talekhajan]. गोखले कुलवृत्तांत [Genealogy of the Gokhale Family] (Kulavruttanta) (in Marathi) (2nd ed.). Pune: Gokhale Kulavr̥ttānta Kāryakārī Maṇdaḷa. LCCN 81902590. OCLC 8113665 – via WorldCat.
- Phadke, Vitthal Ramchandra (1988). आत्रेयारचानास श्यावाशव्हती त्रिप्रवरान्विता अत्रिगोत्रोत्पन्न चित्पावन फडके कुलवृत्तांत : फडके-हसबनीस घराण्यासह [Atreya' Beautiful Creation Born of the Atri Clan with Three Chiefs - Genealogy of the Chitpavan Phadke Family : Including the Phadke-Hasabnis Family] (Kulavruttanta) (in Marathi and Sanskrit) (1st ed.). Pune. LCCN 2012338795. OCLC 781940116 – via Google Books.
- Ranade, Sadashiv (1974). "मांगदरी घराणा" [The House of Mangdari]. चितपावन कौशिक गोत्री आगाशे कुलवृत्तांत [Genealogy of the Chitpavan Agashe Family belonging to the Kaushik Gotra] (Kulavruttanta) (in Marathi). LCCN 74903020. OCLC 20388396 – via University of Michigan.
- Ranade, Sadashiv (1982). "जांभळी घराणा (पहिला)" [The First House of Jambli]. फाटक कुलवृत्तांत [Genealogy of the Phatak Family] (Kulavruttanta) (in Marathi) (2nd ed.). Pune: Phāṭaka Kula Samitī. LCCN 84900881. OCLC 20671450 – via Google Books.
- Report of the Deccan Education Society, Poona, for the Year... Deccan Education Society. 2000. LCCN sa65005216. OCLC 12114778 – via University of Illinois at Urbana-Champaign.
- Wadhwaney, Kishin R. (2005). Indian Cricket and Corruption (1st ed.). New Delhi: Siddharth Publications. ISBN 9788172201760. LCCN 2005323762. OCLC 61211645 – via University of Michigan.
- "बेळगाव घराणा (दुसरे)" [The Second House of Belgaum]. गोगटे कुलवृत्तांत [Genealogy of the Gogte Family] (Kulavruttanta) (in Marathi) (2nd ed.). Mumbai: Gogaṭe Kulamaṇḍala. 2006. LCCN 2012338796. OCLC 781940117 – via Google Books.
