= Mandar Agashe =

Indian businessman and musician (born 1969)

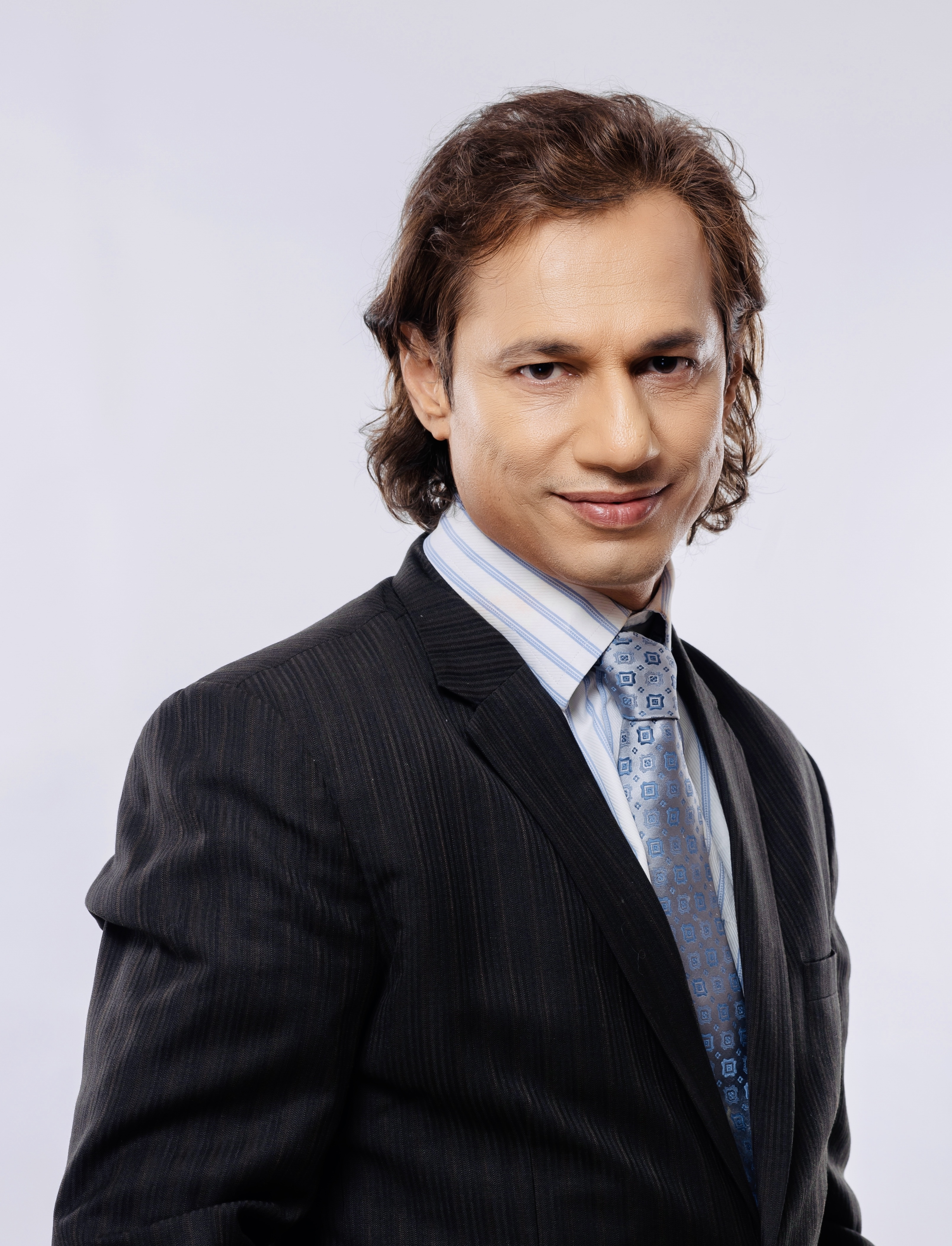
- Official portrait, 2021

Founder, managing director and vice chairman of Sarvatra Technologies
- In office 22 June 2000 – Incumbent

Founder and managing director of Brihans Natural Products
- In office 20 April 2000 – 2005
- Succeeded by: Sheetal Agashe (as CEO)

Joint managing director of the Brihan Maharashtra Sugar Syndicate
- In office 19 August 1994 – 2 August 1999 Serving with Dnyaneshwar Agashe
- Succeeded by: Ashutosh Agashe

Personal details
- Born: 24 May 1969 (age 57) Mumbai, Maharashtra, India
- Spouse: Jiza Agashe (née Aparna Pandharkar) (m. 1996)
- Children: 2
- Parents: Dnyaneshwar Agashe (father); Rekha Gogte (mother)
- Education: Pune Institute of Computer Technology (B. E.)
- Occupation: Businessman; music director; musician
- Musical career
- Genres: Pop, rock, new age, techno, retro, ghazal
- Years active: 1994–present
- Label: Sony BMG

Mandar Dnyaneshwar Agashe (Note: IAST: Maṃdāra Jñāneśvara Āgāśe. Agashe bears his father's name (Dnyaneshwar) as a middle name as per the patronymic Marathi naming conventions, but he is widely known without his patronymic.) (born 24 May 1969) is an Indian businessman, music director, and former musician. He founded Sarvatra Technologies in 2000, and has served as the company's managing director since its inception.

As a musician, he is remembered for his pop and rock music releases in Hindi and English under Sony BMG in the 1990s and 2000s, and for music directing Marathi ghazal albums for Asha Bhosle in 2016, and Rahul Deshpande in 2021.

== Biography ==
=== Early life and family: 1969–1991 ===
Agashe was born on 24 May 1969 in Mumbai, Maharashtra, into an aristocratic and entrepreneurial Chitpavan brahmin family of industrialist Dnyaneshwar Agashe of the Agashe gharana of Mangdari, and wife Rekha Gogte, of the Gogte gharana of Belgaum.

Through his father, Agashe is a grandson of Chandrashekhar Agashe, a nephew of Panditrao Agashe and Shakuntala Karandikar, an older brother of Ashutosh and Sheetal Agashe, of distant relation to Third Anglo-Maratha War general Bapu Gokhale, musician Ashutosh Phatak, historian Dinkar G. Kelkar, and scientist P. K. Kelkar.

Through his mother, Agashe is a great-nephew of B. M. Gogte, a first cousin to poet Rashmi Parekh, a descendant of the aristocratic Latey (Bhagwat) family, and of relation to Kokuyo Camlin head Dilip Dandekar, and academic Jyoti Gogte.

Agashe graduated with a BE degree in software engineering from the Pune Institute of Computer Technology in 1990. He has been married to Aparna Pandharkar since 1996; she adopted the name Jiza Agashe upon marriage. They have two children.

=== Early business career: 1991–2008 ===
In 1991, Agashe was appointed to the board of directors at his grandfather's Brihan Maharashtra Sugar Syndicate, going on to become the joint managing director of the syndicate in 1994, the same year he was appointed a director on his father's Suvarna Sahakari Bank. He founded a number of companies under the Brihans Group – Brihans Pharmaceuticals, an ayurvedic medicine company in 1998, and musicurry.com, an internet radio company in 1999, the same year, he resigned as joint managing director of the syndicate.

By December 1999, Agashe and his CEO Gautam Godse had partnered with California-based software company Questionable Ventures to develop musicurry.com, and in January 2000 he invited Usha Mangeshkar to be the internet radio's creative consultant, with Agashe announcing plans to upload the Mangeshkar family archives to the web service by February–March 2000. The web service was officially launched on 13 January 2000.

In April 2000, he founded Brihans Natural Products, a skincare products manufacturing company, and under him launched its signature aloe vera product range in 2002. In June 2000, he established Sarvatra Technologies, a company that developed banking software for Suvarna Sahakari Bank; alongside his other financial technology companies, EBZ Online and Codito Technologies, also being founded in 2000. In 2002, Agashe purchased stake in Deepak Ghaisas' I-flex Solutions, after the company agreed to partner with Codito, with Ghaisas joining the board of directors. In April 2002, he contributed an essay titled My Father to his father's festschrift.

In 2006, Agashe launched "Anywhere Money" POS terminals under his company Saravatra Technologies to praise and support from politicians such as Shankarrao Gadakh in the Government of Maharashtra. By 2007, Agashe had merged the business operations of EBZ Technologies and Codito with Sarvatra Technologies and partnered with Larry Ellison at the Oracle Corporation to introduce banking software technology to rural India, after the Reserve Bank of India's governor Y. V. Reddy and economist Raghuram Rajan approved the plans in January 2008.

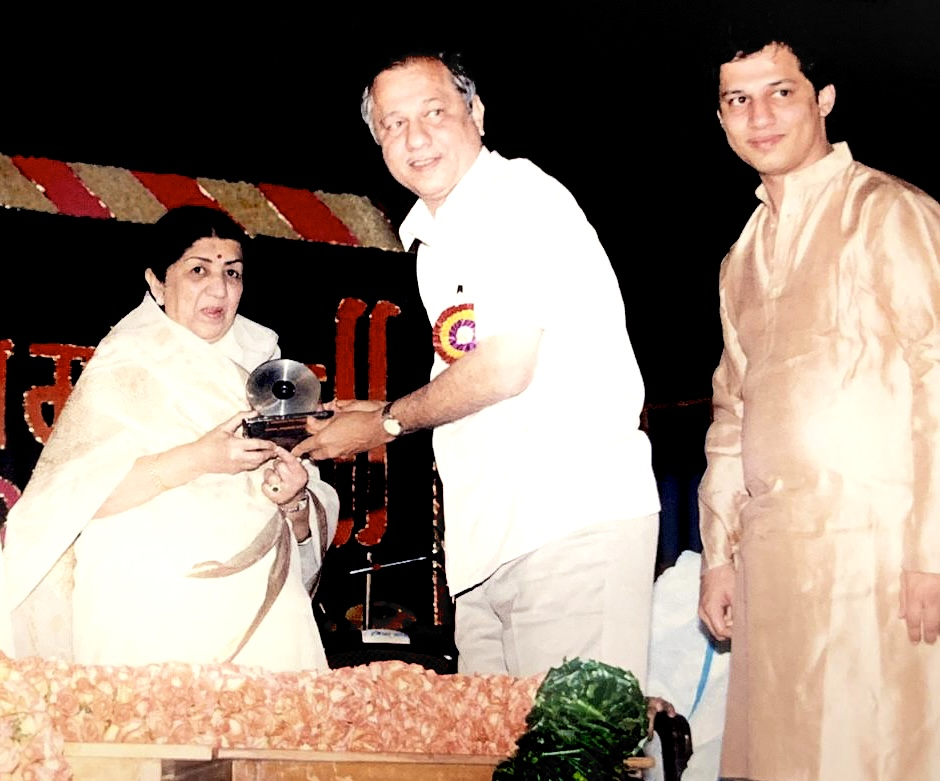
Agashe with his father, felicitating Lata Mangeshkar.

=== Suvarna Sahakari Bank scam allegations: 2008–2009 ===
In November 2008, Agashe was one of the directors implicated during Suvarna Sahakari Bank's ₹4.3 billion alleged scam case. His family, along with other board members of the bank, were arrested on the charges of alleged misuse of their rights to sanction loans to firms owned by themselves and then defaulting those loans, thereby duping the bank's depositors. Agashe was in Germany at the time of the arrests, returning to India for his father's funeral in January 2009.

Agashe was taken into judicial custody in February 2009. After his father's death, Agashe was approached by former depositors of the bank for repayment of the defaulted loans. In early March 2009, he was remanded to magisterial custody after his initial plea for bail was rejected. He was charged with having sanctioned forged loan proposals amounting to ₹1.13 billion. Agashe was subsequently released on bail on 11 March, but was kept under house arrest until the bank merger was resolved. The bank was eventually dissolved and merged with the Indian Overseas Bank in May 2009.

=== Later business career: 2009–present ===
In 2011, Agashe launched Sarvatra's POS terminals to Urban co-operative banks in the Solapur district. Under Agashe's chairmanship, having previously been appointed the company's vice-chair as of 2018, the company's financial switch helping 450 co-operative banks and 50 urban co-operative banks, by 2018 and by 2020 respectively, connect to India's National Electronic Funds Transfer service.

In 2020, at the start of the COVID-19 pandemic, Agashe announced he would consider making half of his employees work from home post-lockdown, further stating that cashless transactions would increase given the risk of contamination and social distancing norms. In February 2021, he was a panelist at a fintech conclave hosted by Businessworld. Between 2021 and 2022, Agashe was often quoted by several publications as an expert for the banking software and financial technology sectors.

In March 2022, Agashe spoke at that year's Businessworld fintech conclave, and was a guest of honour at a conference at his alma mater. He further contributing an article to The Economic Times in October 2022. In March 2023, Agashe stated that it was Sarvatra Technologies' mission to showcase its Unified Payments Interface capabilities to highlight India's payment software capabilities at the 2023 G20 New Delhi summit. In September 2023, he was a panelist at a conference hosted by Banca d'Italia in Rome discussing the Payment Services Directive, writing again for The Economic Times that same month.

In June 2024, he was part of a delegation hosted by Keith Rowley, then Prime Minister of Trinidad and Tobago, exploring the possibility of introducing Sarvatra Technologies' digital payments technology to the country. In August 2024, he was a panelist at the 9th Global Economic Summit at the World Trade Centre, Mumbai, discussing emerging technologies in fintech. In October 2024, the Maharashtra Brahmin Mandal felicitated Agashe and Prasad Oak at the Tilak Smarak Ranga Mandir with entrepreneurship and artist awards, respectively.

In March 2025, Agashe won a portrait drawing by M. F. Husain depicting Agashe and actress Madhuri Dixit at auction in Mumbai. The portrait had been held by the Delhi Art Gallery since 1997, after Husain had drawn it on the set of the movie Dil To Pagal Hai in March 1997. In December 2025, Agashe was one of the chief guests at the Institute of Electrical and Electronics Engineers's Pune academic conference alongside Raghunath Shevgaonkar.

== Musical career ==
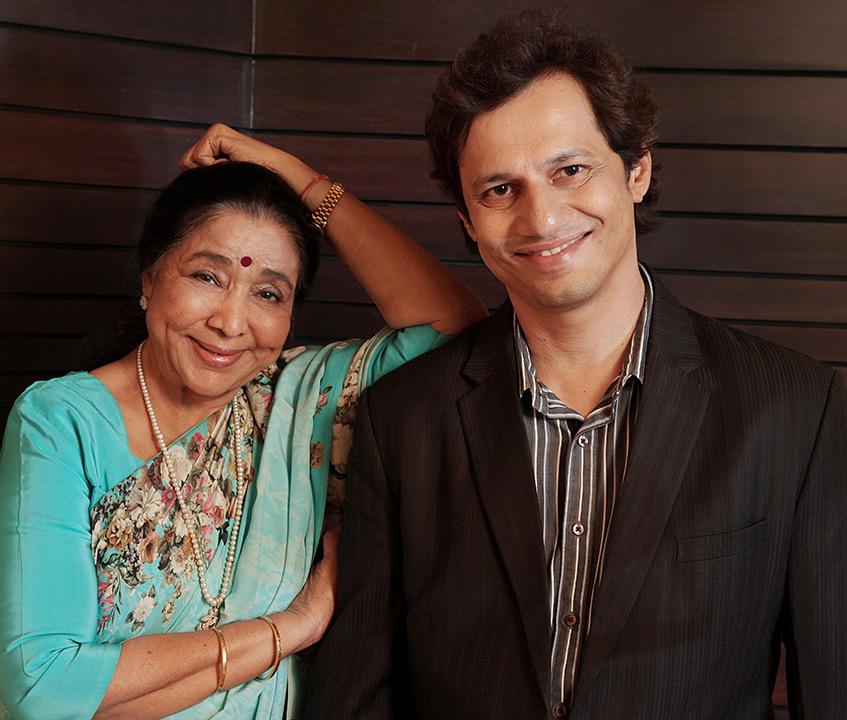
Agashe with Asha Bhosle in April 2016.

During his final year in college, Agashe was introduced to Hridaynath Mangeshkar, who invited him to compose music for the Shirish Atre-Pai-authored Marathi poem Khulya Khulya Re Pavasa (lit. 'Open, Open, Rain'), sung by Asha Bhosle for the Marathi movie Hey Geet Jeevanache (1995). Previously in 1994, Agashe had recorded an English rock music album in Indianapolis, citing The Beatles as a major influence.

In 1997, Agashe released his first Marathi language album titled Achanak (lit. 'Suddenly'). In 1998, he released his first Hindi language album titled Nazar Nazar (lit. 'Look, Look'). The album was produced by Ashutosh Phatak and Dhruv Ghanekar and released in India by Sony BMG.

In 2003, Agashe released a new age-techno track titled I Need Someone in Germany. In 2005, he further released a double-sided album titled Two of Us featuring an album of Hindi pop music titled Jaan Le (lit. 'Know It') and an album of English rock music titled F. C. Road.

In April 2016, Agashe music directed a western pop album of Suresh Bhat's ghazals in Marathi with Asha Bhosle called 82. The album was titled after Bhosle's age at the time of recording. Recorded within one week, the album consisted of ghazals given to Agashe by Bhat. In a televised launch for the album, hosted by Sudhir Gadgil, Agashe and Bhosle also announced a competition for fan-made music videos to the songs on the album.

In June 2021, Agashe music directed a Marathi retro music album of Suresh Bhat's poems and ghazals with Rahul Deshpande titled Theek Aahe, Chaan Aahe, Masta Aahe (lit. 'It's Okay, It's Good, It's Great'). Recorded during the COVID-19 lockdown in India, the album was produced by Vivek Paranjape and featured Aarya Ambekar, Dhanashree Deshpande-Ganatra, and Pranjali Barve as guest vocalists.

== Discography ==
=== As a solo artist ===
- Achanak (1997)
- Nazar Nazar (1998)
- I Need Someone – Single (2003)
- Two of Us (2005)

=== As music director ===
- 82 (2016) by Asha Bhosle
- Theek Aahe, Chaan Aahe, Masta Aahe (2021) by Rahul Deshpande

== Published works ==
=== Articles ===
- Agashe, Mandar (2 October 2022). "The UPI way: Cardless cash withdrawal at ATMs". The Economic Times. BFSI. Archived from the original on 28 November 2022 – via Google News.
- Agashe, Mandar (9 September 2023). "Strengthening India's Digital Payment Dominance through G20 Leadership". The Economic Times. BFSI. Archived from the original on 1 December 2023 – via Google News.

=== Essays ===
- Agashe, Mandar (17 April 2002). "My Father". In Barve, Ramesh; Vartak, Taraprakash; Belvalkar, Sharchandra (eds.). पुत्र विश्वस्ताचा : गौरव ग्रंथ : ज्ञानेश्वर आगाशे षष्ट्यब्दीपूर्ती निमित्त [Putra Viśvastācā : A Festschrift : In honour of Dnyaneshwar Agashe's 60th Birth Anniversary] (Festschrift) (in Marathi) (1st ed.). Pune: Jñāneśvara Āgāśe Gaurava Samitī. p. 3. ISBN 978-1-5323-4594-4. LCCN 2017322864. OCLC 992168227 – via University of Oxford.
  - Agashe, Mandar (17 April 2022). "My Father". In Belvalkar, Sharatchandra; Vartak, Taraprakash; Barve, Ramesh (eds.). Putra Vishwastacha: A Festschrift to Dnyaneshwar Agashe. Translated by Phadnis, Nandan. Compiled by Agashe, Aditya (2nd ed.). Pune, Maharashtra: The Brihan Maharashtra Sugar Syndicate Ltd. p. 4. ISBN 9780578292250. LCCN 2021276707. OCLC 1325123469 – via Google Books.

== Bibliography ==
- Agashe, Aditya (21 April 2025). The Story behind the Sketch of Madhuri Dixit-Nene & Mandar Agashe by M.F. Husain. Introduction by Agashe, Ilina. Afterword by Gogte-Joshi, Aparna. London: Brihans Group. OCLC 1530640969 – via National Art Library, V&A Museum.
- Agashe, Trupti; Agashe, Gopal. (2006). "मांगदरी घराणा" [The House of Mangdari]. In Wad, Mugdha (ed.). आगाशे कुलवृत्तांत [Genealogy of the Agashe Family] (Kulavruttanta) (in Marathi) (2nd ed.). Hyderabad: Surbhi Graphics. ISBN 978-1-5323-4500-5 – via Google Books.
- Barve, D. K. (1982). सागरमेघ: बा. म. ऊर्फ रावसाहेब गोगटे यांचा भैतिक व आत्मिक आविष्कार [Sagarmegh: The Physical and Spiritual Invention of B. M. "Raosaheb" Gogte] (in Marathi). Mumbai: Bombay Book Ḍepot. LCCN 82905037. OCLC 12024875 – via University of Michigan.
- Barve, Ramesh; Vartak, Taraprakash; Belvalkar, Sharchandra, eds. (17 April 2002). पुत्र विश्वस्ताचा : गौरव ग्रंथ : ज्ञानेश्वर आगाशे षष्ट्यब्दीपूर्ती निमित्त [Putra Viśvastācā : A Festschrift : In honour of Dnyaneshwar Agashe's 60th Birth Anniversary] (Festschrift) (in Marathi) (1st ed.). Pune: Jñāneśvara Āgāśe Gaurava Samitī. ISBN 978-1-5323-4594-4. LCCN 2017322864. OCLC 992168227 – via University of Oxford.
- Belvalkar, Sharatchandra; Vartak, Taraprakash; Barve, Ramesh, eds. (17 April 2022). Putra Vishwastacha: A Festschrift to Dnyaneshwar Agashe. Translated by Phadnis, Nandan. Compiled by Agashe, Aditya (2nd ed.). Pune, Maharashtra: The Brihan Maharashtra Sugar Syndicate Ltd. ISBN 9780578292250. LCCN 2021276707. OCLC 1325123469 – via Google Books.
- Business World. Calcutta: Ananda Bazar Patrika Limited. 2000. ISSN 0970-8197. LCCN 81910434. OCLC 7992270 – via Cornell University.
- Company News and Notes. Vol. 36. Ministry of Commerce & Industry. 1999. ISSN 0010-4027. LCCN sa64002695. OCLC 1564543 – via University of California, Berkeley.
- Company News and Notes. Vol. 37. Ministry of Commerce & Industry. 2000. ISSN 0010-4027. LCCN sa64002695. OCLC 1564543 – via University of California, Berkeley.
- "COVID-19 brings about behavioural change in cash usage, say experts". Economy Wrap: Synopsis Of The Main Developements Reported In Leading Newspapers (PDF). New Delhi: Federation of Indian Chambers of Commerce & Industry. 17 May 2021. Archived from the original (PDF) on 1 December 2024 – via Internet Archive.
- Jain, Kavita A.; Pratima (January 2022). "Digital Payment: The Future of Payment in Pandemic Covid-19" (PDF). Remarking an Analisation. 6 (10). Rohtak: Baba Mastnath University. ISSN 2394-0344. Archived from the original (PDF) on 13 June 2024 – via Social Research Foundation.
- K. T., Hari; Kukreja, Mansi (May 2024). "Adapting to Change: Analysing the Impact of the COVID-19 Pandemic on Digital Payment Systems Worldwide" (PDF). International Journal of Research Publication and Reviews. 5 (5). Bangalore: CMS Business School. ISSN 2582-7421. Archived from the original (PDF) on 18 May 2025 – via Google Scholar.
- Kamath, M. V. (1 January 1991). The Makings of a Millionaire: A Tribute to a Living Legend, Raosaheb B.M. Gogte, Industrialist, Philanthropist & Educationist. Mumbai: Jaico Publishing House. LCCN 91906125. OCLC 25633742 – via University of California.
- Karandikar, Shakuntala (10 July 1992). विश्वस्त [Viśvasta] (in Marathi) (1st ed.). Pune: Śrī Prakāśana. ISBN 9781532345012. LCCN 2017322865. OCLC 992168228 – via University of Oxford.
- Karandikar, Shakuntala (14 February 2022). Agashe, Aditya (ed.). Vishwasta – The Trustee: The Life of Industrialist Chandrashekhar Agashe. Translated by Phadnis, Nandan (2nd ed.). Pune: The Brihan Maharashtra Sugar Syndicate Ltd. ISBN 9780578355863. LCCN 2021276641. OCLC 1310118266 – via Google Books.
- Kelkar, Bhaskar; Kelkar, Govind; Kelkar, Yashwant (1993). "कासारवेल – पुणे – धुळे घराणा" [The House of Kasarvel – Pune – Dhule]. केळकर कुलवृत्तांत [Genealogy of the Kelkar Family] (Kulavruttanta) (in Marathi) (2nd ed.). Pune: Yashoda Typesetting. Archived from the original on 26 August 2022 – via Google Books.
- Pan, Hui, ed. (2006). India Weekly Telecom Newsletter. Boston: Information Gatekeepers Inc. OCLC 75963736 – via Google Books.
- Pathak, Gangadhar (1978). "पिरंदावण वाडी – तळेखाजण घराणा" [The House of Pirandavan Wadi – Talekhajan]. गोखले कुलवृत्तांत [Genealogy of the Gokhale Family] (Kulavruttanta) (in Marathi) (2nd ed.). Pune: Gokhale Kulavr̥ttānta Kāryakārī Maṇdaḷa. LCCN 81902590. OCLC 8113665 – via WorldCat.
- Ranade, Sadashiv (1974). "मांगदरी घराणा" [The House of Mangdari]. चितपावन कौशिक गोत्री आगाशे कुलवृत्तांत [Genealogy of the Chitpavan Agashe Family belonging to the Kaushik Gotra] (Kulavruttanta) (in Marathi). LCCN 74903020. OCLC 20388396 – via University of Michigan.
- Ranade, Sadashiv (1982). "जांभळी घराणा (पहिला)" [The First House of Jambli]. फाटक कुलवृत्तांत [Genealogy of the Phatak Family] (Kulavruttanta) (in Marathi) (2nd ed.). Pune: Phāṭaka Kula Samitī. LCCN 84900881. OCLC 20671450 – via Google Books.
- Subramanium, Sudha, ed. (31 March 2023). BAF Times (PDF). Vol. IV. Mumbai: M.L. Dahanukar College of Commerce. Archived from the original (PDF) on 6 February 2025 – via Google Scholar.
- "बेळगाव घराणा (दुसरे)" [The Second House of Belgaum]. गोगटे कुलवृत्तांत [Genealogy of the Gogte Family] (Kulavruttanta) (in Marathi) (2nd ed.). Mumbai: Gogaṭe Kulamaṇḍala. 2006. LCCN 2012338796. OCLC 781940117 – via Google Books.

=== Conferences ===
- Agrawal, Manoj (8 August 2024). Panel Discussion I: Critical Emerging Technologies – Global Collaboration (PDF). 9th Global Economic Summit. Mumbai: World Trade Centre, Mumbai. Archived from the original (PDF) on 5 October 2024 – via Internet Archive.
- Doria, Massimo (26 September 2023). Panel Discussion: From PSD2 to PSD3; from Open Banking to Open Finance (PDF). Peer-to-Peer Financial Systems 2023. Rome: Banca d'Italia. Archived from the original (PDF) on 10 October 2023 – via Internet Archive.
- Institute of Electrical and Electronics Engineers (17 February 2026). Message from Chief Guests, IEEE PuneCon 2025. 2025 IEEE Pune Section International Conference (PuneCon). Pune: Institute of Electrical and Electronics Engineers. doi:10.1109/PuneCon67554.2025.11378658. ISBN 979-8-3315-8834-2. ISSN 2831-5022. Archived from the original on 12 July 2026 – via IEEE Xplore.
- Jain, Amit (2020). Taking off - payments for the masses (PDF). Global FinTech Fest 2020. Kolkata: Ernst & Young. Archived from the original (PDF) on 8 November 2024 – via Internet Archive.
- Kulkarni, Pralhad T. (23 March 2022). "Mr. Mandar Agashe: Guest of Honor of Valedictory". In Kale, G. V.; Sultanpure, K. A.; Varade, P. S. (eds.). ICEI-2022 Abstract Book. 2nd International Conference on Emerging Trends and Innovations in ICT (ICEI-2022). Pune: Pune Institute of Computer Technology. ICEI-2022-AB. Archived from the original on 14 August 2026 – via Yumpu.
- Sharma, Prasar (12 February 2021). Opportunities for Tech Organization in FinTech Ecosystem (PDF). Festival of FinTech Conclave Awards 2021. Mumbai: Businessworld. Archived from the original (PDF) on 7 June 2023 – via Internet Archive.
