= Suvarna Sahakari Bank =

Indian private co-operative bank

- Type: Private urban co-operative bank
- Industry: Banking
- Founded: 22 September 1969; 56 years ago
- Founder: Dnyaneshwar Agashe
- Defunct: 20 May 2009; 17 years ago
- Fate: Merged with the Indian Overseas Bank
- Headquarters: Shaniwar Peth, Pune, Maharashtra, India
- Number of locations: 12 (2009)
- Area served: Pune; Mumbai; Shreepur
- Key people: Dnyaneshwar Agashe (managing director); Ashutosh Agashe (chairman); Mandar Agashe (director)
- Revenue: INR ₹5,000,000,000; (2002)

Suvarna Sahakari Bank was an Indian private non-scheduled urban co-operative bank headquartered in Pune, Maharashtra, India, which operated from its incorporation on 22 September 1969 till its dissolution on 20 May 2009.

The bank rose to significant prominence in 2006, following a cricket administration voting scandal involving its founder Dnyaneshwar Agashe at the Board of Control for Cricket in India in 2004, which saw the bank fail between 2006 and 2008 amid allegations of scam against its board of directors; allegations which the media at the time speculated to be politically charged foul play against its board. The bank was finally dissolved and merged with the Indian Overseas Bank in 2009.

Founded to serve the banking needs of middle class Marathi people, the bank was initially known for its credit schemes in support of small-scale industries, which were supported by the Reserve Bank of India, and cited by B. R. Ambedkar in 1976 and by the Parliament of India in 1983. The bank's failure amidst an alleged scam case, along with its historical business administration practices, have been subsequently widely cited in academic research about the Indian banking sector.

== History ==
The bank was started by Dnyaneshwar Agashe on 22 September 1969, with S. K. Wankhede inaugurating the opening of its first branch. The bank was started to cater primarily to the banking needs of Pune's middle class Marathi population. The bank was classified as an urban cooperative bank, was designated as a non-scheduled bank, and was an authorised credit guarantor for small-scale industries by February 1971.

By 1972, the bank was headquartered in Shaniwar Peth, Pune, with the Reserve Bank of India approving the bank's ability to loan credit schemes for small-scale industries that same year. Panditrao Agashe also served as the bank's manager at the time. In 1976, the bank's schemes featured in B. R. Ambedkar's articles on family planning. In 1983, the bank was part of a report on co-operative banks issued by the Rajya Sabha of the Parliament of India.

From 1990, the bank had nine branches in Pune, two in Mumbai, and one in Shreepur, until the time of its dissolution in 2009. In 1994, Mandar Agashe was appointed as a director to the bank's board of directors. In 1998, the bank organised an inter-bank cricket tournament in honour of Panditrao Agashe. By 2002, the bank initiated online banking, and was reportedly worth ₹500 crore. By 2003, the bank had installed Sarvatra Technologies' proprietary point of sale terminal. In 2004, Ashutosh Agashe was elected the bank's chairman.

== Scam case of 2008–2009 ==
=== Background in cricket administration: 2004 ===
In September 2004, amid factionalism disputes between Dnyaneshwar Agashe and Ajay Shirke at the Maharashtra Cricket Association, then incumbent president of the Board of Control for Cricket in India, Jagmohan Dalmiya, disallowed Agashe to attend its annual general meeting and denied him his right to vote in that year's presidential elections of the board. The subsequent denial to Agashe to exercise his franchise saw Sharad Pawar losing the election for the post of the President of the Board of Control for Cricket in India by a single vote, that would have allegedly been Agashe's.

Various sources claimed that Agashe's actions, in delaying to arrive at the elections in Kolkata or taking immediate objection against his voting ban, were perceived as a deliberate slight by Pawar and his supporters, with the sources further alleging that Agashe's Pune-based businesses started to have trouble as a result of his failure to get Pawar elected as president of the board, in a then Nationalist Congress Party-controlled Maharashtra.

=== Initial financial troubles: 2006–2008 ===
By September 2006, the bank was having financial troubles, with initial non performing assets totalling ₹125 crore, at 13% against the 7% maximum allowable under the norms that had been put forth by the Reserve Bank of India. Within that same month, the bank was put under moratorium by the Reserve Bank of India, and the board of directors for the bank was superseded soon after, and district deputy registrar Sanjay Bhosale was appointed as the bank's administrator. Cosmos Bank initially announced plans to acquire the bank, and the subsequent announcement of the proposed merger led to large-scale panic withdrawals by Suvarna Sahakari Bank's customers within that same month. The moratorium officially came into effect on 14 October 2006, with the media demanding that the Reserve Bank of India launch an investigation of the bank's auditors.

In June 2007, following the order of moratorium, the State Department of Cooperation appointed Mukund Ghaisas as administrator at the bank, and it was reported that the bank would resume regular operations by late 2007. That same month, Hotel Ranjeet, a hotel owned by Agashe was auctioned off in order to recover dues owed to depositors, followed by the sale of Agashe's majority stake in The Kolhapur Steel Ltd., a steel foundry in Kolhapur, to the Kirloskar Brothers in September 2007 for the same reasons.

In February 2008, many of the bank's depositors held demonstrations at Agashe's Aundh residence and threatened criminal actions against the Agashe family. In April 2008, after the non-performing assets of the bank grew to more than 43%, account holders and depositors held a day long fast to protest against the misinformation provided in regards to the alleged duped loans. By May 2008, the Reserve Bank of India gave the bank permission to pay interest on deposits made from January to June 2008, while Agashe had mortgaged personal property worth ₹200 crore in lieu of the recovery of the deposits worth ₹725 crore. In June 2008, Saraswat Co-operative Bank Ltd also showed an interest in acquiring the bank.

=== Allegations and arrests: November–December 2008 ===
On 22 November 2008, Agashe, along with fourteen other board members, including his sons Mandar and Ashutosh, was taken into judicial custody, and the bank business was charged with a ₹436.74 crore scam allegation. The arrest warrant stated that the accused, along with six others, allegedly misused their rights and sanctioned loans mostly to firms owned by themselves and then defaulted the loans, thereby duping the bank's depositors. The arrests were made after a complaint was filed by Rajesh Jadhavar, a special auditor with the Cooperatives Department under the Government of Maharashtra. The complaint was filed with the Ministry of Home Affairs of Maharashtra. The case was designated as an economic crime, however depositors and the media were not satisfied with the arrests, with Agashe promising a speedy merger by the end of that year.

The judicial magistrate remanded Agashe and the fourteen other suspects to police custody on 22 November 2008, with provisions of medical assistance if required, citing the senior citizenship of a majority of the accused. The economic offences wing of the crime branch conducted a raid of all the homes of the accused, including Agashe's Aundh residence to recover ₹1.5 lakhs. The prosecution stated that upon discovery of the money, further interrogation of the accused was necessary and alleged that the accused had disbursed loans to people close to them, thereby flouting Reserve Bank of India regulations.

Between 23 and 30 November 2008, Agashe's defence counsel claimed that Agashe and his family had sold off various properties for the repayment of the loan. The defence counsel also stated that the Agashe family had extended full cooperation with the police and submitted that the family would repay another ₹80 crore after the issue of the bank's merger was settled. The defence also raised the issue of foul play, when the first information reporting of the allegations was not produced before the court three days after registering the case, and further contended that the loans had been sanctioned by the bank's disbursement committee, a committee Agashe was not a member of. The bail applications filed at the time for Agashe, his wife, and his sister were subsequently rejected.

While in custody, Agashe's health deteriorated and he was admitted to Sassoon Hospital on 22 December 2008, suffering from severe diabetes and gangrene, for which he had previously been denied medical assistance. He later died of a heart attack from complications of diabetes at Sassoon Hospital on 2 January 2009. Agashe's son Ashutosh was subsequently released on bail later that same month, with his son Mandar being released in March 2009.

=== Aftermath: January–May 2009 ===
Upon Agashe's death, the depositors of the bank approached the Indian Overseas Bank for help after the bank's accumulated losses were estimated at over ₹350 crore. The bank, having been designated as a bad bank, was allowed by the Reserve Bank of India to be acquired by the Indian Overseas Bank in January 2009, with the agreed merger proceeding in March of that year.

The merger was completed by 20 May 2009, and the bank's branches reopened as branches of the Indian Overseas Bank in late May to much media attention. The transition of operations resulted in ₹14 crore worth deposits being withdrawn that same month, with the Indian Overseas bank reporting in August 2009 that 70 percent of Suvarna Sahakari's clientele has been retained after the merger. In May 2010, the Indian Overseas Bank further reported that an estimated 80 percent recovery of the bank's debtors would be complete by the end of that year.

== Legacy ==
The bank's alleged scam case, its failure amidst a political scandal, and subsequent merger have been widely cited in the Indian banking sector, and in academic research about cooperative banking. The bank's employee relationships, business management, and customer relationship management have also been the subject of subsequent studies in academia.

== Bibliography ==
- Bank Quest. The Journal of the Indian Institute of Bankers (in English and Hindi). Vol. 75. Mumbai: Indian Institute of Banking and Finance. 2004. LCCN sa64008576. OCLC 53065777 – via University of Michigan.
- Barve, Ramesh; Vartak, Taraprakash; Belvalkar, Sharchandra, eds. (17 April 2002). पुत्र विश्वस्ताचा : गौरव ग्रंथ : ज्ञानेश्वर आगाशे षष्ट्यब्दीपूर्ती निमित्त [Putra Viśvastācā : A Festschrift : In honour of Dnyaneshwar Agashe's 60th Birth Anniversary] (Festschrift) (in Marathi) (1st ed.). Pune: Jñāneśvara Āgāśe Gaurava Samitī. ISBN 978-1-5323-4594-4. LCCN 2017322864. OCLC 992168227 – via University of Oxford.
- Barve, Subhash (1990). Pune A to Z: Map Directory with Classified Commercial Index. S. P. Barve. LCCN 2001626405. OCLC 24051890 – via University of Michigan.
- Bhaskaran, R., ed. (March 2009). IIBF Vision (PDF). Vol. 1. Mumbai: Indian Institute of Banking and Finance. Archived from the original (PDF) on 6 May 2012 – via Google Books.
- Bhaskaran, R., ed. (9 July 2009). Annual Report 2008-2009 (PDF). Mumbai: Indian Institute of Banking and Finance. Archived from the original (PDF) on 10 April 2013 – via Google Books.
- Business India. Bombay: A. H. Advani. 2002. ISSN 0254-5268. LCCN 78914172. OCLC 4525594 – via University of Virginia.
- Company News and Notes. Vol. 36. Ministry of Commerce & Industry. 1999. ISSN 0010-4027. LCCN sa64002695. OCLC 1564543 – via University of California, Berkeley.
- Mangudkar, Manikrao Padmana, ed. (1976). Dr. Ambedkar and Family Planning. S. Mangudkar. LCCN 77901519. OCLC 1050494737 – via University of Virginia.
- Parliamentary Debates: Rajya Sabha Official Report. Vol. 125. New Delhi: Rajya Sabha Secretariat, Parliament of India. 1983. ISSN 0537-0167. LCCN 55042537. OCLC 1752810 – via University of Iowa.
- Ray, Partha; Bandyopadhyay, Arindam; Basu, Sanjay (1 May 2021). India Banking and Finance Report 2021. New Delhi: Sage Publishing India. ISBN 978-93-5479-310-3. OCLC 1317309136 – via Google Books.
- Singhania, Rajesh; Sharma, SRRK; Sipayya, R. S.; Venkatesh, R.; Suresh, N. R.; Agarwal, O. P., eds. (28 April 2008). Annual Report 2007-2008 (PDF) (in Hindi and English). Chennai: Indian Overseas Bank. Archived from the original (PDF) on 26 October 2021 – via Google Books.
- Special Credit Schemes of Banks, Guidelines: Report of the Committee on Banks' Credit Schemes with Reference to Employment Potential, Guarantee Scheme for Small Loans to Priority and Neglected Sectors, Guarantee Scheme for Loans to Small-scale Industries, Financing of Agriculture by Commercial Banks, Guidelines. Reserve Bank of India. 1972. LCCN 74903382. OCLC 221860622 – via University of Michigan.
- Supplement to the Reserve Bank of India Bulletin (PDF). Vol. 25. Mumbai: Reserve Bank of India. February 1971. Archived from the original (PDF) on 22 February 2024 – via Gokhale Institute of Politics and Economics.
- The Industrial & Commercial Directory of Poona. Mahratta Chamber of Commerce, Industries and Agriculture. 1972. LCCN 74900513. OCLC 1032010 – via University of Michigan.

=== Academic articles ===
- Narula, Sakshi; Singh, Manish (5 December 2023). Do Creditors Punish Weak Banks? Evidence from Indian Cooperative Banks' Failure. New Delhi, Roorkee: Indian Institute of Technology. SSRN 4681186. Archived from the original on 15 May 2025 – via Social Science Research Network.
- Srinivasan, S. (9 April 2021). "18. 2. Service Conditions of Award Staff Of Erstwhile Shree Suvarna Sahakari Bank Limited, Pune". Know Your Rights: A Compendium On Bank Employees' Struggles, Successes & Settlements. Chennai: Notion Press. ISBN 978-1-63832-615-1. OCLC 1249798169 – via Google Books.
- Srivastava, Uma K.; Srivastava, Pramila (2 August 2012). "Case Studies: Suvarna Sahakari Bank, Pune". Management Consulting in India: Practice and Experiences for Business Excellence. New Delhi: Sage Publications India. ISBN 978-81-321-1686-8. OCLC 812346846 – via Google Books.
- Talwar, Shalini (July–September 2011). Nayar, G. P. C.; Nair, D. Radhakrishnan (eds.). "Jewel to Rust: Sleazy Co-operative Sector" (PDF). SCMS Journal of Indian Management. 8 (3). Cochin: SCMS Cochin School of Business: 29–46. ISSN 0973-3167. Archived from the original (PDF) on 14 July 2020 – via Google Scholar.
