= Agashe =

Agashe (IAST: Āgāśe) is an Indian surname used by Marathi Chitpavan Brahmins of the Kaushik gotra from the Deccan region of India.

== People ==
- Ashutosh Agashe (born 1972), an Indian cricket player and businessman.
- Chandrashekhar Agashe (1888 – 1956), founder of the Brihan Maharashtra Sugar Syndicate Ltd.
- Dnyaneshwar Agashe (1942 – 2009), an Indian businessman, cricketer, cricket administrator and philanthropist
- Sheetal Agashe (born 1977), an Indian businesswoman and former actress
- Shripad Narayan Agashe (born 1939), an Indian botanist and palynologist
- Mandar Agashe (born 1969), an Indian music director and businessman
- Mohan Agashe (born 1947), an Indian theatre and film actor
- Panditrao Agashe (1935 – 1986), Indian businessman

== Places ==
- Panditrao Agashe School, a private, co-educational day school in Pune, Maharashtra, India
- Chandrashekhar Agashe College of Physical Education, sports college in Pune.

== Bibliography ==
- Ranade, Sadashiv (1974). चितपावन कौशिक गोत्री आगाशे कुलवृत्तांत [Genealogy of the Chitpavan Agashe Family belonging to the Kaushik Gotra] (Kulavruttanta) (in Marathi). LCCN 74903020. OCLC 20388396 – via University of Michigan.
- Agashe, Trupti; Agashe, Gopal. (2006). Wad, Mugdha (ed.). आगाशे कुलवृत्तांत [Genealogy of the Agashe Family] (Kulavruttanta) (in Marathi) (2nd ed.). Hyderabad: Surbhi Graphics. ISBN 978-1-5323-4500-5 – via Google Books.
