= Rashmi Parekh =

Indian poet (born 1976)

Rashmi Purandare-Parekh (born 1976, in Mumbai) is an Indian poet, best known for her book Inscape: Lost Words Found (2021), which was noted for its free verse form of contemporary poetry. A graduate of the University of Southern California, she formerly worked as a computer scientist at Cisco.

Through her mother Madhuri Gogte, of the Gogte gharana of Belgaum, Parekh is a great-niece of B. M. Gogte, is first cousins with businessman Mandar Agashe, cricketer Ashutosh Agashe, and former actress Sheetal Agashe, a descendant of the aristocratic Latey (Bhagwat) family, and of relation to Kokuyo Camlin head Dilip Dandekar, and academic Jyoti Gogte.
