= Panditrao Agashe School =

Location
- Pune, Maharashtra; India
- Coordinates: 18.517340°N 73.830259°E

Information
- Type: Co-educational
- Established: 1957
- Key people: Panditrao Agashe
- Campus: Law College Road
- Houses: Blue, green, red, yellow

MVM's Panditrao Agashe School or Panditrao Agashe School, is a private, co-educational day school located on Law College Road in Pune, India. The institution is part of the Maharashtra Vidhya Mandal, which was founded in 1957.

Panditrao Agashe was one of the first Maharashtrian in Pune to start an English-Medium School. He is also known for his English-Marathi and Marathi-English dictionaries. The school caters to pupils from kindergarten up to class 10, and the medium of instruction is English. It Is affiliated with the Maharashtra State Board of Secondary and Higher Secondary Education, Pune which conducts the SSC Examinations at the end of class 10. The school is divided into three sections: pre-primary, primary, and secondary.

== Panditrao Agashe ==
The school's name sake is Jagdish "Panditrao" Agashe (1936 – 1986) the elder brother of the late business magnate Shri. Dnyaneshwar Agashe, eldest son of industrialist Shri. Chandrashekhar Agashe. He served as the managing director of the Brihan Maharashtra Sugar Syndicate Ltd. after his father.

== See also ==
- List of schools in Pune
