= Selector (cricket) =

A selector in cricket is a person given the administrative duty to choose the players that will represent a particular team in a match.

There is typically heavy scrutiny on national team selectors, including those of the major Test cricketing nations like Australia, England, and India. This is largely because in cricket, the highest level of the sport uniquely revolves around international competition, leaving national team selectors with a great deal of responsibility. Should the teams they select fail, the selectors are often vilified for the national side's poor performances.

== See also ==
- Cricket terminology
- Australian cricket selectors
- India national cricket team selectors
