= C Nagaraj =

Indian cricket administrator (died 2005)

C Nagaraj (died 28 January 2005 in Bangalore) was an Indian cricket administrator, who served as the board secretary for the Board of Control for Cricket in India for one term from 1991 till 1993, and served as the secretary of the Karnataka State Cricket Association from 1978 till 2002. He is best remembered for his role in securing the bid with the International Cricket Council for India to host the 1996 Cricket World Cup.
