= Ajay Shirke =

British businessman

Chair of Cadence Audio Ltd
- In office 2012–present

Honorary secretary of the Board of Control for Cricket in India
- In office 2016–2017

Honorary treasurer of the Board of Control for Cricket in India
- In office 2012–2013

President Maharashtra Cricket Association
- In office 2005–2017

Personal details
- Born: 26 April 1958 (age 68) Pune, India
- Education: Loyola High School, Pune
- Occupation: Business administrator
- Profession: company director
- Website: https://cadenceaudio.com/

Ajay Shirke is a British businessman and the chairman (among other things) of Cadence Audio SA which owns the businesses of Audio Lounge Ltd and also includes British-based Spendor Audio Systems, Siltech and Crystal Cable BV from the Netherlands.

== Career ==
As of August 2016 Ajay Shirke purchased SME Limited, a company that manufactures precision turntables and pick-up arms as well as precision engineering parts for Formula One and the aerospace industry. In April 2018, Mr Shirke finalised the acquisition of the iconic Garrard turntable brand and also Loricraft Audio who for many years were the sole authorised service department for existing Garrard turntables. A major part of the Loricraft Audio business is the manufacture of the Professional Record Cleaning (PRC) range of record cleaning machines. These acquisitions are seen by industry observers, to further his commitment to preserve and promote the heritage of traditional British Hi-Fi brands.

He is the son of industrialist and Padma Shri awardee, the late BG Shirke.

In May 2016 he was elected Honorary Secretary of the Board of Control for Cricket in India. On 2 January 2017, the Hon'ble Supreme Court of India passed a judgement to remove Ajay Shirke from his role as the Secretary of the Board of Control for Cricket in India with immediate effect. The ruling came about after Board of Control for Cricket in India failed to implement the Lodha panel reforms.

== Cricket Administration ==
His association with Maharashtra Cricket started in 2003 and he assumed the office of President Maharashtra Cricket Association in 2005. He is credited with spreading the reach of cricket all over Maharashtra. As the Honorary Treasurer of the Board of Control for Cricket in India he brought transparency to the accounting of the board.

In his last tenure as the honorary treasurer of the Board of Control for Cricket in India, the board was hit with a match fixing scandal in the Indian Premier League and he resigned citing lack of transparency and conflict of interest in the board.
