= Irina Glushkova =

Russian phililogist

Irina Petrovna Glushkova (Russian: Ирина Петровна Глушкова) (born 9 August 1952) is a Soviet and Russian indologist and philologist, a chief researcher of the Institute of Oriental Studies of the Russian Academy of Sciences, specializing in the study of Dnyaneshwar and the Varkari tradition of Maharashtra, India. She was nominated as the ambassador of Maharashtra tourism and culture in Russia by then Chief Minister Devendra Fadnavis on 11 July 2016.

== Publications ==
- Indiĭskoe palomnichestvo : metafora dvizhenii︠a︡ i dvizhenie metafory, 2000
- Iz indiĭskoĭ korziny : istoricheskie interpretat︠s︡ii, 2003
- Podvizhnostʹ i podvizhnichestvo : teorii︠a︡ i praktika tirtkha-i︠a︡try, 2008
- Semanticheskie priznaki abstraktnogo obraza, 2012
