= Shripad Narayan Agashe =

Indian botanist

Shripad Narayan Agashe (born 1939) is an Indian botanist and palynologist, best known for his academic books Paleobotany: Plants of the Past, Their Evolution, Paleoenvironment, and Application in Exploration of Fossil Fuels (1997), Palynology and Its Applications (2006), and Pollen and Spores: Applications with Special Emphasis on Aerobiology and Allergy (2019). He serves as professor of botany for Bangalore University.
