= Cooch Behar Trophy =

Under-19 cricket tournament in India

- Countries: India
- Administrator: Board of Control for Cricket in India
- Headquarters: Mumbai, Maharashtra
- Latest edition: 2024–25
- Next edition: 2025–26
- Tournament format: 4 day
- Current trophy holder: Tamil Nadu U-19
- Website: https://www.bcci.tv

The Cooch Behar Trophy is India's national four-day cricket tournament for under-19 players. It has been held annually since the 1945–46 season. It is run by the Board of Control for Cricket in India.

== History ==
The trophy was donated by, and named after, the family of the Maharaja of Cooch Behar. From 1945–46 to 1986–87 the Cooch Behar Trophy was a schools competition. It changed to an under-19 competition in 1987–88.

== Current format ==
Matches are played over four days. All the Ranji Trophy teams field sides, except for Railways and Services. The sides are divided into four groups, each of which plays a round-robin. After the group matches are completed, quarter-finals, semi-finals and a final are held.

== Prominent players ==
Many Test players have been prominent in the Cooch Behar Trophy in their youth. Budhi Kunderan and Rusi Surti scored centuries in North Zone Schools' victory in the 1954–55 final. Ashok Mankad represented West Zone Schools in the final for three consecutive seasons from 1960–61 to 1962–63. Karsan Ghavri and Mohinder Amarnath were the leading bowlers on opposing sides in a semi-final in 1967–68. Sachin Tendulkar scored 214 for Mumbai Under-19s in 1988–89. He made his Test debut less than a year later.

In the final in 1999–2000 Yuvraj Singh made 358 in Punjab Under-19s' total of 839 for 5. According to Yuvraj, the Cooch Behar Trophy was second only to the Ranji Trophy in importance for young cricketers at the time, but has declined in status since then, supplanted by the Indian Premier League.

In January 2024, Prakhar Chaturvedi of Karnataka scored 404 not out in the final against Mumbai, beating Yuvraj Singh's record for a final. Karnataka won by 510 runs on the first innings, securing their maiden Cooch Behar Trophy. The highest score in the tournament overall is 451 not out by Maharashtra's Vijay Zol against Assam in December 2011.
