= Anne Feldhaus =

American historian of religion

Anne Feldhaus (Phelḍahāusa, Âna; born 1949) is Distinguished Foundation Professor of Religious Studies, Emeritus Professor, at Arizona State University. Her field of specialty is Maharashtra, India, combining philological and ethnographic approaches to study religious traditions of Maharashtra, the Marathi-language region of western India.

== Honors and awards ==
Among her awards and honors are Fulbright-Hays Research Award (1993–1994)(1987–1989); Social Science Research Council Research Award (1995); John Simon Guggenheim Fellowship (2002–2003); National Endowment for the Humanities, Fellowship for Independent Research (2007–2008).

She was president of the Association for Asian Studies 2018- 2019. and in 2020 was elected to the American Academy of Arts & Sciences

== Academic career ==
She first went to India as an undergraduate in 1970, lived with a Brahman family, and later recalled that her "knowledge of Indian culture was confined to translations of the Bhagavad Gita (which I found immoral) and some Upanishads (which I found incomprehensible)." She also recalled, however, that her "Roman Catholic childhood and Sacred Heart education had prepared me quite well to appreciate an all-encompassing ritualization of life."

After graduating from Manhattanville College in 1971, she earned her Doctor's degree in Religious Thought at University of Pennsylvania in 1976. She joined the faculty of Arizona State University in 1981, and became full professor there in 1988.

== Selected publications ==
- Feldhaus, Anne (n.d.), On My Way of Living in India, University of Pennsylvania Department of History of Art
- Feldhaus, Anne (1976). The Mahanubhava Sutrapatha (PhD thesis). University of Pennsylvania.
- —— (1985). The Deeds of God in Rddhipur. New York: Oxford University Press.
- ——; Tulapule, Sã Go (1992). In the Absence of God : The Early Years of an Indian Sect : A Translation of Smrtisthal, with an Introduction. Honolulu: University of Hawaii Press. ISBN 9780824813352.
- —— (1995). Water and Womanhood : Religious Meanings of Rivers in Maharashtra. New York: Oxford University Press.
- —— (1996). Images of Women in Maharashtrian Literature and Religion. Albany: State University of New York Press. ISBN 978-0-585-04283-1.
- —— (2014). Say to the Sun, "Don't Rise," and to the Moon, "Don't Set"; : Two Oral Narratives from the Countryside of Maharashtra. Oxford: Oxford University Press.
- —— (2006). Connected Places : Region, Pilgrimage, and Geographical Imagination in India. New York: Palgrave Macmillan. ISBN 978-1-4039-8134-9.
- ——; Vora, Rajendra (2006). Region, Culture, and Politics in India. Delhi; New Delhi: Manohar; Distributed in South Asia by Foundation Books. ISBN 978-81-7304-664-3.
- ——; Bhagavan, Manu Belur (2010). Speaking Truth to Power : Religion, Caste and the Subaltern Question in India. Oxford: Oxford University Press. ISBN 978-0-19-806349-0.
