= Central Water and Power Research Station =

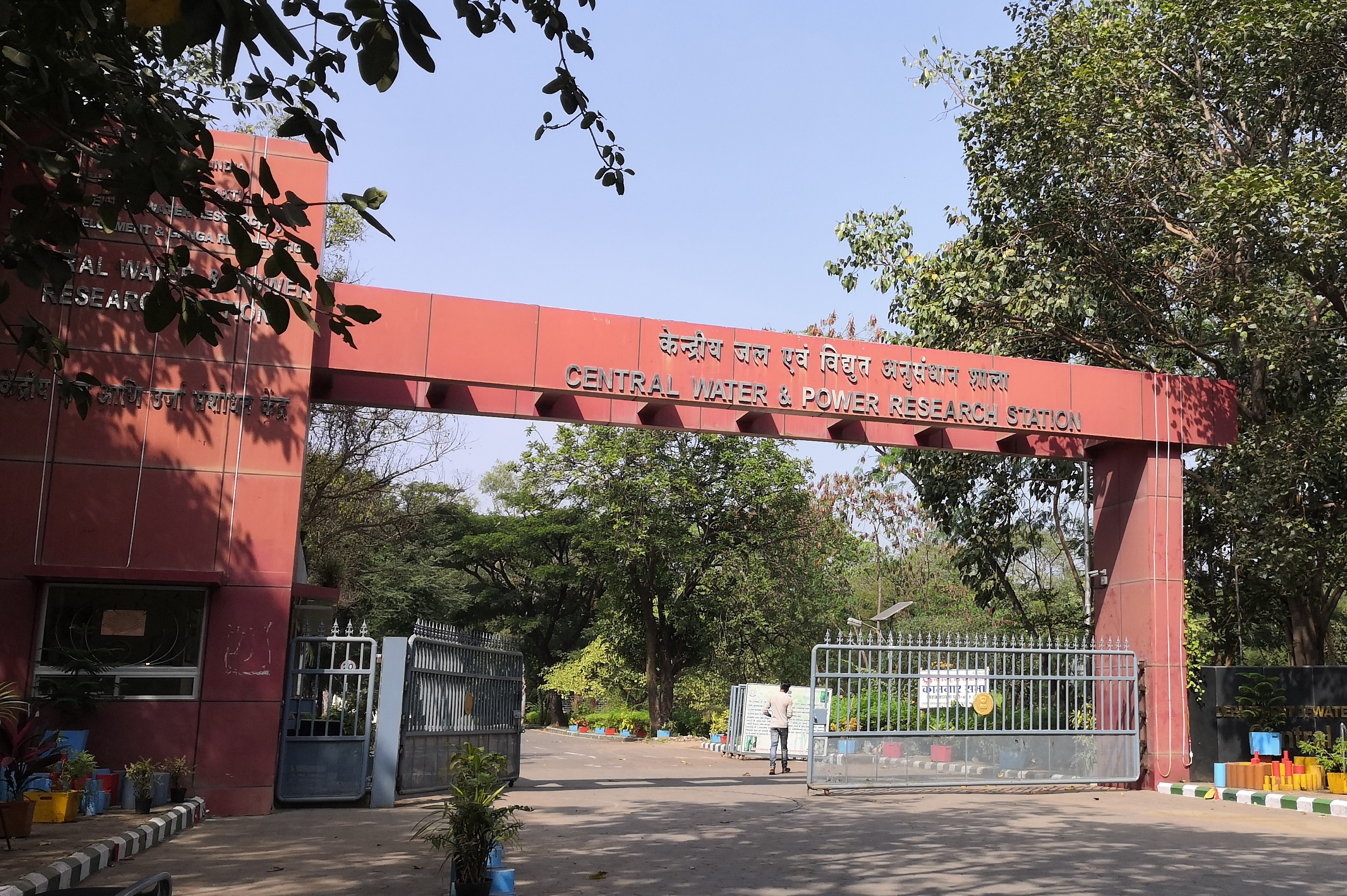
Entrance of CWPRS

Central Water and Power Research Station, Poona in 1954.

The Central Water and Power Research Station (CWPRS) Pune is the major research organisation in the field of hydraulic and allied research as a subordinate office of the Department of Water Resources, River Development and Ganga Rejuvenation, Ministry of Jal Shakti, Government of India and deals with planning, organising and undertaking specific research and development studies related to optimising designs of river, coastal, water storage and conveyance hydraulic structures.

== History ==
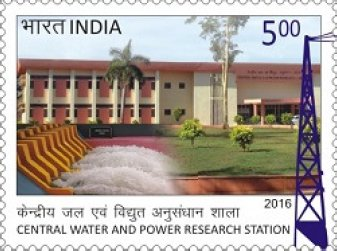
Stamp of India 2016 Central Water And Power Research Station

It was established in the year 1916 in Pune by then Bombay Presidency as a Special Irrigation Cell.
