= Brihan Maharashtra Sugar Syndicate Ltd. =

Indian sugar company

- Type: Limited
- ISIN: INE109V01017
- Industry: Sugar, liquor, metal printing, ayurvedic products, health care products, real estate
- Founded: 21 September 1934; 91 years ago
- Founder: Chandrashekhar Agashe
- Headquarters: Shaniwar Peth, Pune, Maharashtra, India
- Area served: Maharashtra
- Key people: Ashutosh Agashe (managing director)
- Revenue: IN₹21,086,127 (2022)
- Total equity: IN₹50,000,000 Authorised capital; IN₹22,719,600 Share capital; (2021)
- Parent: Brihans Group
- Subsidiaries: Brihans Natural Products Ltd.
- Website: thebmssltd.com

The Brihan Maharashtra Sugar Syndicate Ltd. is an Indian sugar company headquartered in Pune, Maharashtra, India. Established on 21 September 1934, it is one of the oldest continuously operating companies in India, and is the namesake of the Brihan Maharashtra College of Commerce.

Founded by Chandrashekhar Agashe as a limited liability company through crowdfunding, the syndicate was initially supported by sugar manufacturing policies of the Bombay Presidency and by some princely states of the Deccan States Agency between 1934 and 1938, with its first factory being operational by 1939. During the Second World War, the syndicate planting food crops as demanded by the British Raj. Following Indian independence in 1947 and up until Agashe's death in 1956, the syndicate received criticism from its competitors for its business administration and Agashe personally for his management style.

Beginning in the 1950s, the syndicate was managed in a decentralised system until the maturity of Agashe's heirs Jagdish and Dnyaneshwar Agashe, and lost significant portions of its agricultural land to the socialist land nationalisation policies of the Indian government in the 1960s. In the 1970s, the syndicate was one of the first companies to manufacture Indian-made foreign liquor after the Government of Maharashtra repealed prohibition, until it sold its liquor manufacturing arm to Radico Khaitan in 2013. Operating as a cooperative since 1988, the syndicate has also ventured into manufacturing veterinary medicine, health care products, and Ayurvedic skincare products directly or under its subsidiaries since the 1990s.

== History ==
=== Under Chandrashekhar Agashe: 1934–1956 ===
In 1933, the Governor of Bombay, The Lord Brabourne promoted the production of indigenous sugar, having had increased the import tax on the commodity shipping in from Mauritius. This enabled Chandrashekhar Agashe to found the Brihan Maharashtra Sugar Syndicate Ltd. on 21 September 1934, as a limited liability company after two years of crowdfunding campaigns, with funds collected from amongst the Maharashtrian middle classes. The syndicate was headquartered in Pune.

Between 1934 and 1936, Agashe envisioned opening a factory branch of the Syndicate in his hometown of Bhor, and began cultivating 2,000 acres of land for the plantation of sugar cane. In 1935, he began employing tenanted farmers of the local gentry and independent farmers as producers or transportation workers of the sugar cane for the syndicate in the village of Bhorgaon. By 1936, he had licensed or purchase 12,000 acres of farm land to support the syndicate, being lauded for reviving the local economy and consequently receiving further land grants from bankers in Akluj and several politicians in the Bhor State.

After Agashe established the syndicate's headquarters at the Commonwealth Building on Laxmi Road, the Mahratta Chamber of Commerce, Industries and Agriculture declared the sale of 300,000 shares of the syndicate, with the first share going at Rs. 25 in January 1935. Between 1935 and 1937, Agashe toured several states and jagirs within the Deccan States Agency, promoting the syndicate at several village gram panchayats. In July 1937, C. E. Aitken, the superintending engineer of the Deccan Irrigation Circle raised concerns about the syndicate's factory to Sir Geoffrey Thomas Hirst Bracken, reporting that the syndicate had sanctions, although they had the machinery, and were practicing the open pan system of sugar cultivation and were growing from their own seeds. By 1937, the syndicate's factory produced 35 hundredweights of sugar.

In November 1937, Agashe ordered sugar cane processing machinery from Škoda Works in Czechoslovakia before the outbreak of World War II. Following Adolf Hitler's rise to power and the German occupation of Czechoslovakia, Agashe considered retracting his order, but received the ordered machinery before the Reichswerke Hermann Göring took over Škoda. He began construction for the first factory in April 1938, and finally established the syndicate's first sugar cane processing factory in the village of Bhorgaon in March 1939, further purchasing an estate and the surrounding lands as a means to look after his own sugar plantations, with the syndicate's principal factory soon producing 150,000 sacs of sugar per annum by 1940, selling the sugar under the trademark Shree, with the village panchayat renaming the town Shreepur.

In 1943, Agashe's donation to the Deccan Education Society led to the establishment of the Brihan Maharashtra College of Commerce in Pune, named after the syndicate. That same year, the Bombay Presidency decreed the plantation of food crops as mandatory for private sugar manufacturers to support British troops during World War II. Agashe formed a farmers union so as to not disrupt the syndicate's sugar processing and at the same time meet the food demands of the British Raj, although this move was unpopular with the farmers due to low profitability.

After Indian independence in 1947, Agashe was able to expand the syndicate's production to 1000 tonnes of sugar cane processed per annum by 1950. In 1950, the University of Bombay surveyed the syndicate's labour conditions. By 1953, there was strong opposition to Agashe's role as the managing director of the syndicate from his critics, with the syndicate involved in several allegations of duping shareholders and depositors in the early 1950s. Agashe, in response, published a 400-page report criticizing his detractors of corruption and factionalism based on evidence that his critics were backed by his competitor Karamshi Jethabhai Somaiya, who had previously shown interest in purchasing the syndicate.

In 1954, the syndicate advertised in the publication of the Mahatma Phule Museum, where Agashe was on the board. In July 1955, the syndicate was among the several other sugar factories that filed appeals with the Labour Appellate Tribunal, Bombay, to settle matters between it and the worker's unions regarding the high rate the court had decreed for the sugar factories' to pay towards the provident funds of its employees. Agashe died in June 1956. He was survived in business by his sons Panditrao Agashe and Dnyaneshwar Agashe.

=== Under S. L. Limaye, K. V. Champhekar and G. S. Valimbe: 1956–1970 ===
Agashe left the syndicate in a strong position. With a decentralised management, S. L. Limaye took over as chairman of the board of directors of the company, serving from 1957 till 1990, while K. V. Champhekar took over as managing director of the company from 1957 to 1962, followed by G. S. Valimbe from 1963 to 1969, until Agashe's sons Panditrao and Dnyaneshwar became joint managing directors in July 1970.

The several senior managers of the company aided Panditrao Agashe, given his considerable youth when he joined the board of directors in 1957. By 1958, the syndicate also maintained a permanent office in Solapur and Shreepur, Maharashtra, with the syndicate celebrating its silver jubilee in 1959. Between 1958 and 1966, the syndicate financially aided several farming communities around the Malshiras taluka, including those regions affected by the Panshet dam flood in 1961.

The later half of the 1960s saw the syndicate battle the Government of Maharashtra's socialist land acquisition schemes, which they ultimately lost, relinquishing several thousand acres of syndicate owned land to the Government of India. Between 1961 and 1963, the syndicate had also decreased its trade credit percentage of liabilities with the Bank of Maharashtra. In 1964, the syndicate had employment disputes regarding the reduction of staff in its civil engineering department. By 1966, Panditrao's brother Dnyaneshwar Agashe joined him on the board of directors of the syndicate, with both the brothers becoming joint managing directors in July 1970.

=== Under Panditrao Agashe and Dnyaneshwar Agashe: 1970–2009 ===
Beginning in the 1970s, under Panditrao and Dnyaneshwar Agashe, the syndicate manufactured liquor in Shreepur, Maharashtra, specialising in whisky production under its several flagship brands. The syndicate was one of the first companies to produce a range of government-approved liquors after the Maharashtra state prohibition, called Indian-made foreign liquor. In 1978, Panditrao retired as joint managing director leaving Dnyaneshwar as the sole managing director.

By the early 1980s, the syndicate also briefly engaged in the business of metal printing. In October 1980, the syndicate was surveyed on its impact on Maharashtra's rural economy by the Gokhale Institute of Politics and Economics. Under Dnyaneshwar, the company launched a brandy in partnership with Camus Cognac. In 1984, the company sponsored a sports tournament in Dadar. In 1986, the company sponsored a squash tournament. In 1988, the company shifted to being a cooperative. By 1989, the syndicate was considered a leading manufacturer of alcohol in the country.

In 1990, Dnyaneshwar took over as chairman of the board of directors for the syndicate upon the death of S. L. Limaye, a position he would serve until his death in January 2009. In 1991, a test plant developed from research funded by the United States Agency for International Development was installed at the syndicate which controlled pollution during the manufacturing of industrial alcohol. That same year, Dnyaneshwar's son Mandar Agashe joined the syndicate's board of directors, going on to become a joint managing director with his father by 1994. Dnyaneshwar's younger son, Ashutosh Agashe, was appointed to the board of directors in 1996.

By 1998, the syndicate began marketing ayurvedic medicines, health care products, and bulk raw materials. It was also involved in the manufacturing of food products and veterinary medicine. That same year, the syndicate hosted cricket tournaments in Pune. In 1999, Mandar resigned as joint managing director, going on to found the syndicate's subsidiary company Brihans Natural Products Ltd. in 2000. The syndicate began promoting ayurvedic skincare products made by Brihans Natural Products Ltd. That same year, Ashutosh was appointed as joint managing director.

By 2002, the syndicate also manufactured alcohol-based chemicals. In 2005, the syndicate entered a partnership with Howling Wolves Wine Group of Australia which planned to set up a wine production base in India. The partnership was made with Baumgarten & Walia Ltd., a wholly owned subsidiary of the syndicate. That same year, Radico Khaitan signed an agreement with the syndicate for acquisition of their liquor brands Brihans Napoleon Brandy, Brihans Premium Whisky, Brihans Grape Brandy, Tropicana White Rum, Calcutta Dry Gin, Lord Nelson Rum and Red Russian Vodka in line with their domestic growth plan.

Between 2004 and 2009, the syndicate allegedly faced difficulties in hiring workers for its growing and harvesting seasons at its factory, as backlash for the controversial elections at the Board of Control of Cricket in India in 2004 involving Agashe and Sharad Pawar, whose Nationalist Congress Party controlled the Government of Maharashtra at the time.

=== Under Ashutosh Agashe: 2009–present ===
In 2009, upon Dnyaneshwar Agashe's death, Ashutosh Agashe was appointed chairman and managing director of the syndicate. In 2013, the syndicate sold its liquor manufacturing arm to Radico Khaitan. In 2014, the syndicate was involved in a dispute concerning the trademark 'Tango' with the Brihan Karan Sugar Syndicate Private Limited (BKSSPL).

In May 2021, during the COVID-19 pandemic in India, Ashutosh and the syndicate donated oxygen concentrators to hospitals in Shreepur, Maharashtra. In 2022, the syndicate commissioned Nandan Phadnis to do the English to Marathi translations of Chandrashekhar Agashe's 1992 biography authored by Shakuntala Karandikar, and Dnyaneshwar Agashe's 2002 festschrift. Both translated works were published by the syndicate on the birth anniversaries of their respective subjects that same year.

== Bibliography ==
- Agashe, Chandrashekhar (21 October 2022). Agashe, Aditya (ed.). Selected Writings (in English and Marathi) (Limited first ed.). London, Dublin: Brihans Group. ISBN 9798987233429. LCCN 2023544612. OCLC 1368249725 – via National Library of Ireland.
- Agashe, Trupti; Agashe, Gopal. (2006). "मांगदरी घराणा" [The House of Mangdari]. In Wad, Mugdha (ed.). आगाशे कुलवृत्तांत [Genealogy of the Agashe Family] (Kulavruttanta) (in Marathi) (2nd ed.). Hyderabad: Surbhi Graphics. ISBN 978-1-5323-4500-5 – via Google Books.
- Bapat, Seema; Bapat, Sadanand (2007). "नारिंग्रे – कल्याण – जुन्नर घराणा" [The House of Naringre – Kalyan – Junnar]. बापट कुलवृत्तांत [Genealogy of the Bapat Family] (Kulavruttanta) (in Marathi) (3rd ed.). Pune.
- Barve, Ramesh; Vartak, Taraprakash; Belvalkar, Sharchandra, eds. (17 April 2002). पुत्र विश्वस्ताचा : गौरव ग्रंथ : ज्ञानेश्वर आगाशे षष्ट्यब्दीपूर्ती निमित्त [Putra Viśvastācā : A Festschrift : In honour of Dnyaneshwar Agashe's 60th Birth Anniversary] (Festschrift) (in Marathi) (1st ed.). Pune: Jñāneśvara Āgāśe Gaurava Samitī. ISBN 978-1-5323-4594-4. LCCN 2017322864. OCLC 992168227 – via University of Oxford.
- Beckman, Robert (September 1991). "Technology projects target Indian firms". Frontline. 13 (8). Columbia University: United States Agency for International Development: 12–13. ISSN 2334-5187. LCCN sn91023343. OCLC 2261367 – via Cornell University.
- Belvalkar, Sharatchandra; Vartak, Taraprakash; Barve, Ramesh, eds. (17 April 2022). Putra Vishwastacha: A Festschrift to Dnyaneshwar Agashe. Translated by Phadnis, Nandan. Compiled by Agashe, Aditya (2nd ed.). Pune, Maharashtra: The Brihan Maharashtra Sugar Syndicate Ltd. ISBN 9780578292250. LCCN 2021276707. OCLC 1325123469 – via Google Books.
- Bracken, Sir Geoffrey, ed. (1938). Oral Evidence recorded during enquiry on the Sugar Industry: Local Government, Associations, Chambers of Commerce, Individual firms and persons. Vol. V. Delhi: Indian Tariff Board. hdl:10973/24154 – via Gokhale Institute of Politics and Economics.
- Bracken, Sir Geoffrey, ed. (1939). Written Evidence recorded during the enquiry into the Sugar Industry: Replies received from the Local Governments and Indian States. Vol. III–A. Delhi: Indian Tariff Board. hdl:10973/24151 – via Gokhale Institute of Politics and Economics.
- Business India. Vol. 108–116. A. H. Advani. 1982. ISSN 0254-5268. LCCN 78914172. OCLC 4525594 – via Northwestern University.
- Defence Management. Vol. 16. Secunderabad: Institute of Defence Management. 1989. LCCN 76913327. OCLC 3443903 – via University of Illinois Urbana-Champaign.
- Karandikar, Shakuntala (1992). विश्वस्त [Viśvasta] (in Marathi) (1st ed.). Pune: Śrī Prakāśana. ISBN 9781532345012. LCCN 2017322865. OCLC 992168228 – via University of Oxford.
- Karandikar, Shakuntala (14 February 2022). Agashe, Aditya (ed.). Vishwasta – The Trustee: The Life of Industrialist Chandrashekhar Agashe. Translated by Phadnis, Nandan (2nd ed.). Pune, Maharashtra: The Brihan Maharashtra Sugar Syndicate Ltd. ISBN 9780578355863. LCCN 2021276641. OCLC 1310118266 – via Google Books.
- Kothari's Economic and Industrial Guide of India. Kothari & Sons. 1978. LCCN 72904460. OCLC 1784174 – via University of Michigan.
- Kothari's Economic Guide and Investors' Handbook of India. Kothari & Sons. 1969. LCCN sa63000226. OCLC 1773664 – via University of Michigan.
- Large Industrial Establishments in India. Indian Labour Bureau. 1958. LCCN 54021640. OCLC 1774594 – via University of Michigan.
- Limaye, P. M.; Vaze, S. G. (July 1955). "Labour Appellate Tribunal: Contribution to the Provident Fund". In Kakade, R. G. (ed.). The Indian Civil Liberties Bulletin (PDF). Poona: Servants of India Society. Archived from the original (PDF) on 29 June 2024 – via Gokhale Institute of Politics and Economics.
- Maharashtra State Gazetteers: Solapur. Director of Government Printing, Stationery and Publications, Maharashtra State. 1977. LCCN sa64006876. OCLC 77864804 – via University of California.
- Mulani, Sikandar S. (2014). Socio Economic Development in Solapur District. ISBN 978-1-312-37394-5 – via Google Books.
- Museum Education (PDF). Poona: Tata Day Publications. 1954. Archived from the original (PDF) on 19 February 2024 – via Gokhale Institute of Politics and Economics.
- Oturkar, R. V., ed. (1951). Poona: Look and Outlook. Pune Municipal Corporation. LCCN 74173050. OCLC 1324027 – via University of California.
- Panda, H. (7 February 2002). Handbook On Chemical Industries (Alcohol Based). Asia Pacific Business Press Inc. ISBN 978-81-7833-067-9. OCLC 191026377 – via Google Books.
- "Shri Chandrashekhar Govind Agashe". Annals of the Bhandarkar Oriental Research Institute. Vol. 36. Bhandarkar Oriental Research Institute. 1955. p. 382. JSTOR 44082979. LCCN 25006272. OCLC 6988270115 – via University of Michigan.
- Silver Jubilee Souvenir. Bank of Mysore. 1967. LCCN sa68013088. OCLC 474783 – via University of Michigan.
- The Maharashtra Government Gazette. Government of Maharashtra. 1964. LCCN sf95095974. OCLC 1257791636 – via University of California.
- Year Book & Directory of Indian Sugar Factories. Sugar Technologists Association of India. 1973. LCCN sa63001259. OCLC 11961862 – via University of California.

=== Academic theses ===
- Deodhar, L. D. (1950). Labour in the Sugar Industry of the Bombay-Deccan (Ph.D. thesis). Poona: University of Bombay. hdl:10973/44888. Archived from the original on 22 February 2025 – via Gokhale Institute of Politics and Economics.
- Patwardhan, M. V. (February 1966). The Growth of Bank of Maharashtra Limited in its Area of Operation (PDF) (Ph.D. thesis). Poona: University of Poona. hdl:10973/45098. Archived from the original (PDF) on 14 May 2025 – via Gokhale Institute of Politics and Economics.
- Tupe, S. D. (23 October 1980). Impact of Sugar Factories on the Rural Economy: A Case Study (Ph.D. thesis). Pune: Gokhale Institute of Politics and Economics. hdl:10973/44913.

=== Business reports ===
- Agashe, D. C. (14 August 1990). Director's Report of the Brihan Maharashtra Sugar Syndicate (Report) (in Marathi and English). Pune.
- Agashe, D. C. (3 October 1992). Director's Report of the Brihan Maharashtra Sugar Syndicate (Report). Pune.
- Agashe, D. C. (9 August 1995). Director's Report of the Brihan Maharashtra Sugar Syndicate (Report). Pune.
- Agashe, D. C. (8 August 1997). Director's Report of the Brihan Maharashtra Sugar Syndicate (Report). Pune.
- Limaye, S. L. (2 February 1959). Director's Report of the Brihan Maharashtra Sugar Syndicate (Report). Poona.
- Limaye, S. L. (2 November 1963). Director's Report of the Brihan Maharashtra Sugar Syndicate (Report). Poona.
- Limaye, S. L. (16 November 1967). Director's Report of the Brihan Maharashtra Sugar Syndicate (Report). Poona.
- Limaye, S. L. (24 October 1971). Director's Report of the Brihan Maharashtra Sugar Syndicate (Report). Poona.
- Limaye, S. L. (5 November 1979). Director's Report of the Brihan Maharashtra Sugar Syndicate (Report). Pune.
- Limaye, Y. D. (2 August 1999). Director's Report of the Brihan Maharashtra Sugar Syndicate (Report). Pune.
- Limaye, Y. D. (23 August 2001). Director's Report of the Brihan Maharashtra Sugar Syndicate (Report). Pune.
- Limaye, Y. D. (3 August 2009). Director's Report of the Brihan Maharashtra Sugar Syndicate (Report). Pune.
