= Mangdari =

Village in Maharashtra

Mangdari is a village in Velhe Taluka in the Pune District of Maharashtra, India.

== Geography ==
Mangdari is located at 18°17′0″N 73°46′0″E. It has an average elevation of 549 metres. It belongs to Desh or Paschim Maharashtra region. It belongs to the Pune Division. It is located 32 km towards South from district headquarters Pune. 18 km from Velhe. 148 km from state capital Mumbai. The total geographical area of village is 245 hectares.

== Demographics ==
Marathi is the local language of Mangdari. The total population is 622 and number of houses are 116. Female population is 48.7%. Village literacy rate is 74.9% and the female literacy rate is 32.5%.

== History ==
The village was originally part of the Bhor State, under the rule of the Pantsachiv Kings. In the 1590s, majority of the land in the village was given to the Agashe gharana, as vassals to the Pantsachiv rulers, as they were occupied as the savkars (money lenders/bankers) under the Pantsachiv Kings of the Kingdom.

== See also ==
- Bhor State
