= K. R. Wadhwaney =

Indian sports journalist and author (died 2019)

Kishin Wadhwaney
- Born: K. R. Wadhwaney
- Died: 24 October 2019
- Occupation: Journalist
- Notable work: Indian Cricket and Corruption; Indian Cricket Controversies; Scandals, Controversies & World Cup-2003

Kishin Wadhwaney, better known as K. R. Wadhwaney was an Indian author and sports journalist.

== Biography ==
Wadhwaney was born in Karachi (in undivided India, now in Pakistan). Later he moved to Lucknow after partition in 1947. From where he moved to Delhi during 1960s. He had served as the chief sports editor for The Indian Express for more than three decades. Wadhwaney had been known for his close association with organizations for sports journalists like Sports Journalists’ Federation of India, Asian Sports Journalists’ Union etc. At Sports Journalists’ Federation of India he served as the founding secretary. He had written altogether 31 books, which were primarily sports themed covering not only popular sports like Cricket but also less popular sports like Hockey, Swimming etc.

== Death ==
Wadhwaney died on October 24, 2019, at the age of 90.

== Selected works ==
- Wadhwaney, Kishin R.. Indian Cricket Controversies. N.p.: Diamond Pocket Books Pvt Ltd, 2017.
- Wadhwaney, Kishin R.. Scandals, Controversies & World Cup-2003. India: Diamond Pocket Books (P) Limited,
- Wadhwaney, Kishin R.. The Romance of World Cup Cricket, 1975–2003. India: Har-Anand Publications, 2002.
- Indian Airports: Shocking Ground Realities, 2004
- Wadhwaney, Kishin R.. Indian Cricket and Corruption. India: Siddharth Publications, 2005.
- Wadhwaney, Kishin R.. Cricket War Plus Shooting. India: Har-Anand Publications, 2002.
- Wadhwaney, Kishin R.. Kapil Dev: The Prince of Allrounders. India: Siddharth Publications, 1995.
- Wadhwaney, Kishin R.. Triumphs and Tragedies of Indian Hockey. India: Siddharth Publications, 2005.
- Wadhwaney, Kishin R.. The Story of Swimming. India: Publications Division, Ministry of Information & Broadcasting, Government of India, 2002.
- Wadhwaney, Kishin R.. SMG Sportingly Spoilsport. India: Siddharth Publications, 2010.
- Wadhwaney, Kishin R.. Cricket's Murky Underworld. India: Ajanta Books International, 2001.
- Wadhwaney, Kishin R.. India-Pakistan "Ashes," 1952–99. India: Har-Anand Publications, 2000.
- Wadhwaney, Kishin R.. M.S. Dhoni: A Child of Destiny. India: Har-Anand Publications Pvt. Limited, 2017.
- Wadhwaney, K. R. Lala Amarnath: A Stormy Petrel of Indian Cricket. India: Ajanta Publications, 2000.
- Wadhwaney, K. R. The Troublesome Test Tussle
- K.R. Wadhwaney, Arjuna Awardees, Publications Division, Ministry of Information and Broadcasting, Government of India, 2002.
