= Sadashiv Ranade =

Indian historian

Sadashiv Bhaskar Ranade
- Born: 1912
- Died: ?
- Occupations: Biographer, historian, genealogist

Sadashiv Bhaskar Ranade (IAST: Sadāśiva Bhāskara Rānaḍe; born 1912) was an Indian biographer, historian and genealogist. He is most notable for having documented the family histories and genealogies of several Chitpavan brahmin families into almanacs called Kulavruttantas (Marathi: कुलवृत्तांत) in Marathi, from 1969 to 1982.

== List of works ==
- रानडे कुलवृत्तांत [The Ranade Family Almanac] (1969)
- रानडे कुलवृत्तांत : पूर्वाणी [The Ranade Family Almanac : Addendum] (1971)
- आगाशे कुलवृत्तांत [The Agashe Family Almanac] (1974)
- मनोहर कुलवृत्तांत [The Manohar Family Almanac] (1977)
- रिसबड कुलवृत्तांत [The Risbud Family Almanac] (1978)
- फाटक कुलवृत्तांत [The Phatak Family Almanac] (1982)
