= Gangadhar Pathak =

Indian writer, poet and historian

Gangadhar Ramchandra Pathak
- Born: 1923
- Died: ?
- Occupations: Writer, poet, historian

Gangadhar Ramchandra Pathak (born 1923) was an Indian writer, poet and historian, most notable for his works Antara (1962), Śaktiketu (1962) and Apaṅgā (1965).

== List of works ==
- Antara (1962)
- Śaktiketu (1962)
- Daivarekhā, Kādambarī (1964)
- Apaṅgā (1965)
- Dhanañjaya; tīna aṅkī sāmājika nāṭaka (1966)
- Kan̂cana : saras sāmājik kādambari (1974)
- Gokhale kulavr̥ttānta (1978)
