= Shreepur, Maharashtra =

Village in Malshiras Taluka, Solapur District, Maharashtra, India

Shreepur is a village in Malshiras Taluka in the Solapur District of Maharashtra, India.

== Geography ==
Shreepur is located at 18°10′0″N 73°51′0″E. It has an average elevation of 493 metres. It comes under Mahalung Panchayath. It belongs to Desh or Paschim Maharashtra region. It belongs to Pune Division. It is located 104 km towards west from District headquarters Solapur. 18 km from Malshiras. 315 km from State capital Mumbai.

== Demographics ==
Marathi is the local Language of Shreepur. BJP and NCP are the major political parties in this area.

== History ==
The present day village was originally part of the Bhor State, and called Mahalung. In 1935, Chandrashekhar Agashe started employing farmers in the village for the Brihan Maharashtra Sugar Syndicate Ltd. He began construction for the first factory in April 1938, and finally established the syndicate's first sugar cane processing factory in the village in March 1939, selling the sugar under the trademark Shree, the village panchayat of Mahalung changed the village's official name to Shreepur.

== See also ==
- Bhor State

== Bibliography ==
- Karandikar, Shakuntala (1992). विश्वस्त [Viśvasta] (in Marathi) (1st ed.). Pune: Śrī Prakāśana. ISBN 9781532345012. LCCN 2017322865. OCLC 992168228 – via Bowker.
- Karandikar, Shakuntala (14 February 2022). Agashe, Aditya (ed.). Vishwasta – The Trustee: The Life of Industrialist Chandrashekhar Agashe. Translated by Phadnis, Nandan (2nd ed.). Pune, Maharashtra: The Brihan Maharashtra Sugar Syndicate Ltd. ISBN 9780578355863. LCCN 2021276641. OCLC 1310118266 – via Google Books.
