= Maharashtra Cricket Association =

Governing body of cricket in Maharashtra, India

- महाराष्ट्र क्रिकेट संघटना
- Sport: Cricket
- Jurisdiction: Maharashtra, India
- Abbreviation: MCA
- Founded: 1953; 73 years ago
- Affiliation: Board of Control for Cricket in India
- Regional affiliation: West Zone
- Headquarters: Maharashtra Cricket Association, Narveer Tanaji Wadi, Shivajinagar, Pune – 411005
- Location: Gahunje, Pune, Maharashtra, India
- President: Rohit Rajendra Pawar
- Secretary: Shubhendra Bhandarkar
- Women's coach: n/a
- Sponsor: Punit Balan Group Manikchand Oxyrich

Official website
- www.cricketmaharashtra.com
- Other key staff: Sanjay Bajaj (treasurer)
- (India)

The Maharashtra Cricket Association (Marathi: महाराष्ट्र क्रिकेट संघटना) is the governing body of the cricket in the Maharashtra state of India. Its Maharashtra cricket team represent Maharashtra state in Indian cricket. It is affiliated to the Board of Control for Cricket in India.

Its women team represents Maharashtra in women's domestic cricket competitions while men's team in tournament : Ranji trophy, Vijay Hazare trophy etc. of BCCI. The association have an international standards Cricket stadium, the Maharashtra Cricket Association Stadium at Gahunje village near Pune in Maharashtra, where its headquarter is present.

Nationalist Congress Party MLA Rohit Pawar is its present president. In 2023 the board founded its franchise cricket league, the Maharashtra Premier League which is based on BCCI's Indian Premier League.

Maharashtra state's district Cricket associations are affiliated to this board.

== History ==
The Maharashtra Cricket Association was established to promote and develop cricket in the state of Maharashtra, India. Initially, the MCA used the Nehru Stadium in Pune for international matches. However, due to disputes over ticket allocations with the Pune Municipal Corporation, the MCA decided to construct its own stadium.

=== MCA Stadium ===
In 2007, the MCA commissioned Hopkins Architects to design a new 57,000-seat stadium in Pune. The groundbreaking ceremony for the new stadium was performed on October 21, 2007, by Sharad Pawar, the then President of the Board of Control for Cricket in India.

The MCA Stadium hosted its first Ranji Trophy game between Maharashtra and Himachal Pradesh on December 21, 2011. It was officially inaugurated on April 1, 2012, by Sharad Pawar, who was then the ICC President.

The stadium hosted its first international fixture, a T20I match between India and England, in December 2012. In November 2015, it was granted approval as a Test match center by the International Cricket Council (ICC), and it hosted its first Test match in February 2017.

The MCA Stadium has since become a prominent venue for IPL and international cricket matches. It has served as the home ground for IPL teams such as Pune Warriors India and Rising Pune Supergiant. The stadium's unique design, featuring a roof made of steel trusses resembling a spider's web, has made it an architectural marvel and a symbol of Maharashtra's love for cricket.

== Tournament ==
Maharashtra Cricket Association founded its franchise league Maharashtra Premier League (MPL) in 2023, which have six teams. It sold the franchise rights for 57 crore rupees for three years through open bidding. The first season will be held Jun 15, 2023 onwards at Pune's stadium. Pune franchise was sold in 14 Cr along with Ruturaj Gaikwad as their iconic player, Kedar Jadhav is Kolhapur franchise's iconic player.

== Team ==
This board's teams represent Maharashtra in domestic cricket championships such as Ranji Trophy, Vijay Hazare Trophy and Syed Mushtaq Ali Trophy. Maharashtra women's cricket team represents Maharashtra in women's cricket. These team plays its home matches at MCA Stadium, Pune.

== Affiliated district associations ==
The district Cricket associations which are affiliated to the Maharashtra Cricket association are as follows.

- Ahilyanagar district Cricket association
- Beed district Cricket association
- Chatrapati Sambhajinagar district Cricket association
- Dhule district Cricket association
- Nanded district Cricket association
- Jalgaon district Cricket association
- Pune district Cricket association
- Nashik district Cricket association
- Kolhapur district Cricket association
- Nandurbar district Cricket association
- Hingoli district Cricket association
- Satara district Cricket association
- Jalna district Cricket association
- Sangli district Cricket association
- Latur district Cricket association
- Solapur district Cricket association
- Dharashiv district Cricket association
- Raigad district Cricket association
- Ratnagiri district Cricket association
- Parbhani district Cricket association
