= Latey family =

Indian noble family

The Latey family is Chitpavan brahmin family from India. The family originally bore the surname of Bhagwat, and was established since the 1610s at Murbad by Naro Narsihna Bhagwat and his wife Lakshmibai.

The family came to prominence after the Battle of Kharda on March 11, 1795, when cavalier Balkrishna Bhagwat, after leading a successful cavalry charge against the forces of the Nizam of Hyderabad, was bestowed several honors by Peshwa Madhavrao II. His principal honor was the hereditary office of castellan of Sadashivgad in Tembhu, along with the honor of attending court at the Shaniwar Wada in a palanquin procession. The surname of Latey was a corruption of the Marathi word Latley (लॅटले), a slang term meaning "stolen" or "robbed". This term was applied to the family in jape by other Chitpavan families at the Peshwa's court for having received such honors, eventually being adopted by the family as their legal surname.

Industrialist Raosaheb Gogte was a descendant of this family through his mother.
