= Chandrashekhar Agashe =

Indian industrialist (1888–1956)

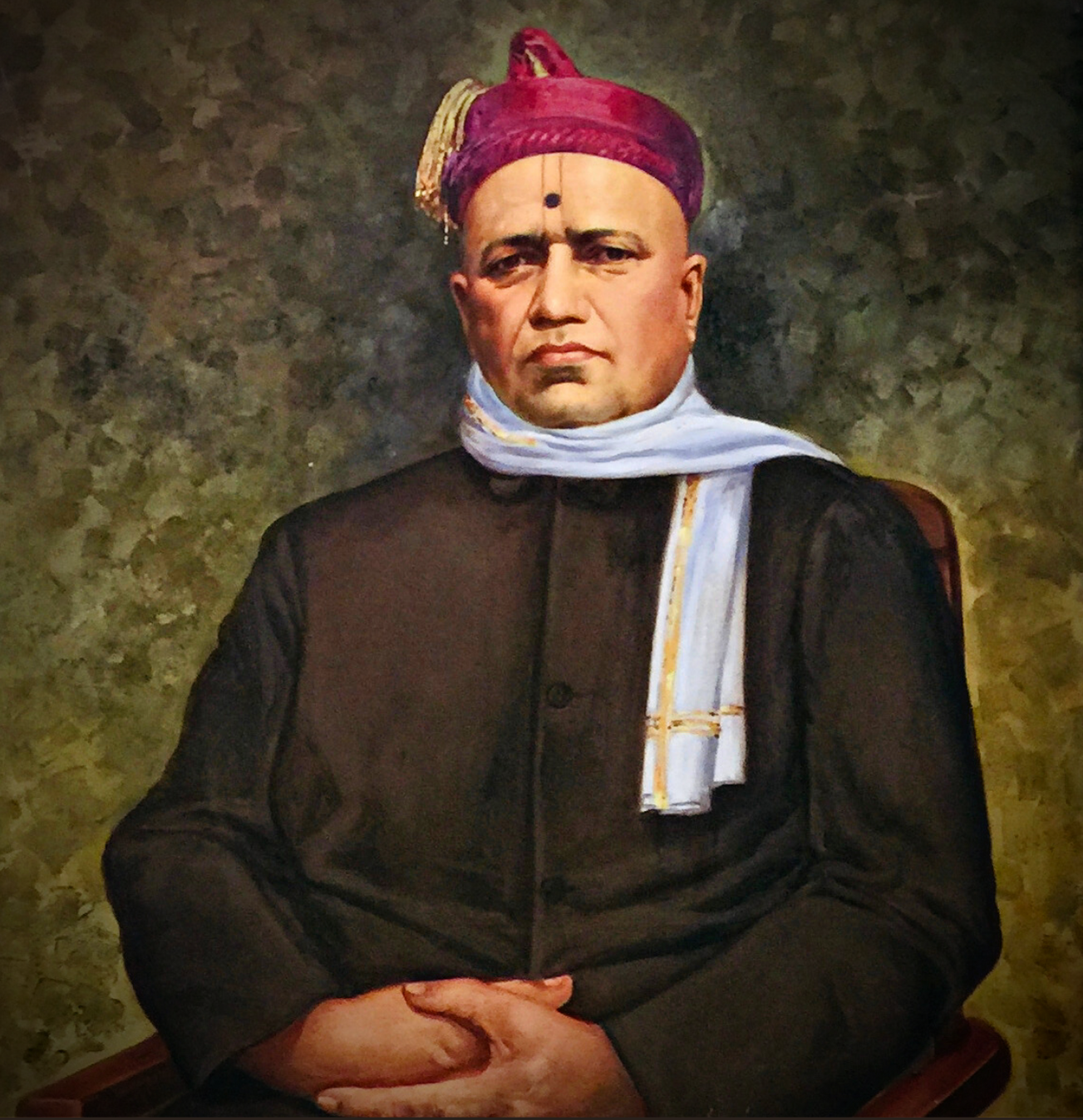
- Posthumous oil on canvas by Raghuveer Bharam, 1997

Managing agent of the Brihan Maharashtra Sugar Syndicate Ltd.
- In office 21 September 1934 – 9 June 1956
- Preceded by: Position established
- Succeeded by: K. V. Champhekar

President of the Bhor State Council
- In office 1934–1948
- Monarch: Raghunathrao II Shankarrao, 11th Raja of Bhor

Vice president of the Bhor State Council
- In office 1933–1934
- Monarch: Raghunathrao II Shankarrao, 11th Raja of Bhor

Secretary of the Bhor State Council
- In office 1932–1933
- Monarch: Raghunathrao II Shankarrao, 11th Raja of Bhor

Chief justiciar of the Bhor State
- In office 1920–1932
- Monarchs: Shankarrao Chimnajirao, 10th Raja of Bhor (till 1922); Raghunathrao II Shankarrao, 11th Raja of Bhor (till 1932)

Vice president of the Bharat Itihas Sanshodhak Mandal
- In office 1953–1955 Serving with Bhagwant Rao Trimbak, Raja of Aundh and Sadashivrao Ragunathrao, Raja of Bhor
- President: Malojiraje Nimbalkar IV, Raja of Phaltan

Personal details
- Born: 14 February 1888 Bhor, Bhor State, Poona Agency, British Raj
- Died: 9 June 1956 (aged 68) Pune, Maharashtra, India
- Cause of death: Myocardial infarction
- Spouse: Indirabai Agashe (née Dwarka Gokhale) (m. 1914)
- Children: 11 (including Shakuntala, Jagdish, and Dnyaneshwar)
- Parents: Govind Agashe (father); Bhimabai Bapat (mother)
- Education: Fergusson College (BA); Government Law College, Mumbai (LL.B)
- Occupation: Industrialist; lawyer; educator; philanthropist
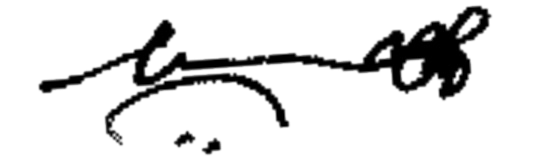
- Signature

Chandrashekhar Govind Agashe (Note: IAST: Candraśekhara Goviṃda Āgāśe, Marathi pronunciation: [tʃəndɾəʃeːkʰəɾ ɡoːʋɪnd ɑːɡɑːʃeː]. Agashe bore his father's name (Govind) as a middle name as per the patronymic Marathi naming conventions, but he is widely remembered without his patronymic, as seen in the institutions named after him.) (14 February 1888 – 9 June 1956) was an Indian industrialist, lawyer, educator, and philanthropist, best remembered as the founder of the Brihan Maharashtra Sugar Syndicate Ltd. He served as the managing agent (Note: The designation according to the Indian Companies Act, 1913 was officially "managing agent"; however as per the Companies Act, 1956, the roles and duties of a managing agent were merged with that of a "managing director".) of the company from its inception in 1934 till his death in 1956.

Born to an aristocratic brahmin family in the Indian princely state of Bhor, he was an educator and lawyer in his youth, before going on to serve as the president of the Bhor State Council from 1934 to 1948, having previously been the council's vice president from 1933 to 1934, the council's secretary from 1932 to 1933, and the chief justiciar of the Indian princely state from 1920 to 1932, first under the 10th Raja of Bhor and then the 11th Raja of Bhor.

Throughout his career, Agashe wrote extensively in the Kesari, and was a founding member of the Mahratta Chamber of Commerce, Industries and Agriculture. His numerous public addresses, written notices, and missives as part of his fundraising activities for the syndicate came to be known as the Agashe pattern, a means of equity crowdfunding, among businesses and press in Maharashtra between 1934 and 1956.

Remembered for his philanthropy towards education in Maharashtra, Agashe donated extensively to the Deccan Education Society, the Bhandarkar Oriental Research Institute, and the Maharashtra Mandal. He also served as one of the co-vice presidents of the Bharat Itihas Sanshodhak Mandal from 1953 to 1955, alongside Bhagwant Rao Trimbak, Raja of Aundh and Sadashivrao Ragunathrao, Raja of Bhor, during the presidency of Malojiraje Nimbalkar IV, Raja of Phaltan.

The Chandrashekhar Agashe College of Physical Education, the Chandrashekhar Govind Agashe Business Motivation & Training Centre at the Brihan Maharashtra College of Commerce, the Chandrashekhar Agashe Museum wing at the Raja Dinkar Kelkar Museum, the Chandrashekhar Agashe Road in Shaniwar Peth, Pune, and the Chandrashekhar Agashe High School in Shreepur, are named after him.

== Biography ==
=== Early life and family: 1888–1914 ===
Agashe was born on 14 February 1888 at the Velhe Mahal in the town of Bhor, at the time part of the Bhor State in present-day Maharashtra. He was the eldest of four children to Govind Agashe and Radhabai Agashe (née Bhimabai Bapat). His family was Chitpavan brahmin, and was established since the 1590s as the aristocratic Agashe gharana of the village of Mangdari in the Bhor State. The family was traditionally occupied as the savkars (money lenders/bankers) and pseudo-hereditary chief justiciars under the Pantsachiv Kings of the Kingdom, and thus owned majority of the land in the village as vassals to the Pantsachiv rulers, where they continued the traditional family businesses of money lending and tenanted farming. Agashe's father, when serving as the chief justiciar, was the only Brahmin savkar at the royal court of Bhor at the time of his birth.

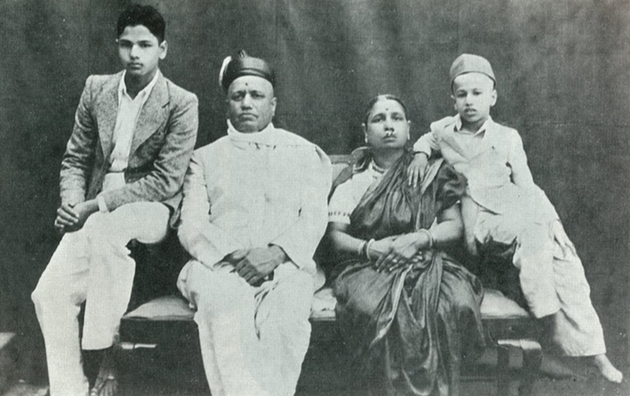
Agashe with his wife Indira (center) and their sons Jagdish (left) and Dnyaneshwar (right) in the 1950s.

Agashe's maternal family were members of the aristocratic Bapat gharana of Kalyan, having settled a branch of the original family in Junnar in 1698, traditionally occupied as the chieftains of the town. His mother was the fourth daughter of Junnar's hereditary mamledar, Ramchandra Bapat (b.1828, at Kamshet), who worked as a case historian and published several historical cartographs of old Pune after he was appointed the Karbhari of Tulsi Baug by the Sardar Khire (Tulsibaugwale) family in Pune.

After his father's death in 1899, Agashe was meant to inherit the ancestral estate at age 11; but due to his youth, his paternal relatives unlawfully seized the lands, and ousted Agashe's mother and her children from the family home. She relocated the family to her parents' residence in Shaniwar Peth, Pune in 1900. The loss of the family's estate, made Agashe accept secretarial work at the Indian Post Office to support himself and his siblings through school. Later, he was left the Omkareshwar Mandir in Shaniwar Peth in the former owner's will. Agashe attended the Nutan Marathi Vidyalaya, matriculating in 1905 at the age of 17, and later graduated with a Bachelor of Arts from Fergusson College in 1914, at the age of 26.

In 1914, Agashe married Dwarka Gokhale, the eldest daughter of Narayan Gokhale from the aristocratic Gokhale gharana of Dharwad. Her family had served as the hereditary royal saraf (jewellers) to the Peshwa Bhat family since the 18th century. She was a great niece of Bapu Gokhale, a general under Peshwa Baji Rao II of the Maratha Empire. She adopted the name Indirabai Agashe after marriage, and the couple had a total of eleven children (including sons Jagdish "Panditrao" Agashe and Dnyaneshwar Agashe, and daughter Shakuntala Karandikar), from which nine survived to adulthood.

=== Career as an Educator, Lawyer and the Bhor State Council: 1914–1948 ===
From 1914 to 1917, Agashe taught mathematics at the Nutan Marathi Vidyalaya in Pune, after which he was occupied as a visiting professor at a convent school in Karachi. From 1917 to 1926, Agashe worked as an educator in Mumbai, while he pursued the study of law, graduating with an L.L.B from the Government Law College, Mumbai in 1919. He began practicing his advocacy in Pune and was a lawmaking advisor to the Bhor State government.

Between 1920 and 1932, Agashe was appointed the Chief Justiciar at the royal court of Shankarrao Chimnajirao, 10th Raja of Bhor (r. 1871 – 1922), continuing to serve under his successor Raghunathrao II Shankarrao, 11th Raja of Bhor (r. 1922 – 1948). Agashe encountered political unrest between the commoners and the gentry at the Pantsachiv's court resulting in violent rioting from the common-folk of the Bhor State. Agashe co-wrote an opinion piece against this political factionalism with Narasimha Chintaman Kelkar in the newspaper Kesari. With the permission of the king, he soon established a Lokpaksh for carrying out fair trial at the royal court to resolve conflicts.

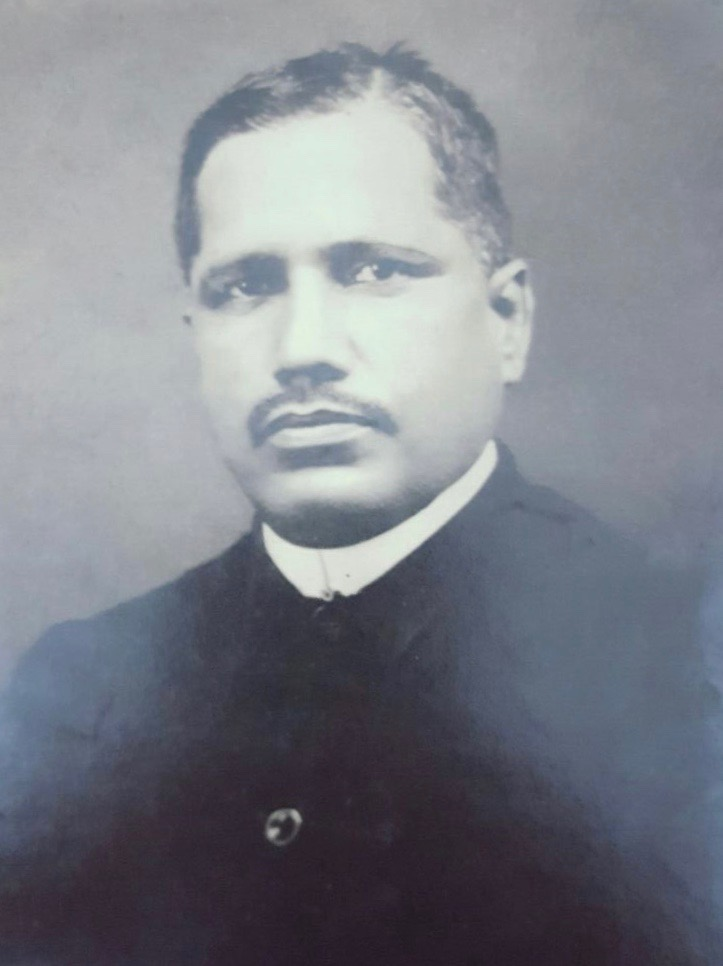
Agashe, circa 1930.

The discouraging response to the Lokpaksh from the Pantsachiv's subjects led Agashe to consider retiring from law in the late 1920s. Upon attending a speech by Bal Gangadhar Tilak, Agashe and his family began practicing the principles of the Swadeshi movement and started considering entrepreneurial ventures as a means to participate in the Indian independence movement in Maharashtra. Agashe supported several Indian freedom fighters, including Lokmanya Tilak and Vinayak Damodar Savarkar, but never considered entering politics himself; his younger brother, Narayan Agashe actively participated in politics surrounding the Indian independence movement, serving a brief prison time for rioting against the British Raj in the early 1930s, before aiding his elder brother in his business venture. Around this time, he also become an early subscriber to Savarkar's Hindu Rashtra Prakashan organisation.

In 1932, Agashe was appointed as the Secretary of the Bhor State Council, and in under a year, he was elected to the post of Vice President in 1933, and then the President of the council in 1934, a post he maintained until the accession of the state into the Dominion of India in 1948. During the time of his vice presidency, the unrests and disagreements between the royal court and the commoners of the princely state continued. Several legislations Agashe helped bring forth in favour of the commoners were opposed by the gentry, resulting in growing involvement from the Deccan States Agency.

In April 1932, Agashe, in his capacity as editor-in-chief of the daily newspaper Sansthani Bharat on behalf of the Bhor State, wrote an article congratulating the 11th Raja of Bhor on his swift action in the reorganisation of the state's previously poorly-advised administration. In March 1933, Agashe also visited Mahatma Gandhi when he was imprisoned at Yerawada Central Jail in Pune.

In June 1933, in an oratory address to Lieutenant-general Harold Wilberforce-Bell, the Agent to the Governor-General of India for the Deccan States Agency in Kolhapur at the time, Agashe put to rest the concerns of any mismanagement of the state and the success of the Lokpaksh in resolving any agitation between the subjects and the nobility of the state. He further referenced how the state and the 11th Raja's administration had performed in line with Lord Irwin's recommendations for the governments of Indian princely states. In the same address, Agashe also encouraged the Deccan States Agency to name the bridge over the Nira River in Bhor after the 11th Raja's extant second wife, Rani Laxmibai.

In August 1947, Agashe, in his capacity as President of the Bhor state council, feted the 11th Raja of Bhor on the occasion of the Raja's silver jubilee alongside B. G. Kher, Vaikunthbhai Mehta, Ganesh Vasudev Mavalankar, Hari Govindrao Vartak, and Raja Chintamanrao II "Bala Sahib" Patwardhan of Kurundvad Senior. Agashe and Narasimha Chintaman Kelkar were further presented with the robes of the state of Bhor at the ceremony.

In March 1948, a photograph of Agashe's was unveiled by the 11th Raja of Bhor during a state visit to Pali, Raigad. That same month, Agashe served as one of the pleaders who declared the 11th Raja's resolution to accede the Bhor State into the Dominion of India as progressive and liberal in nature. During Agashe's later presidency, he provided financial encouragement and legal counsel to small and new business owners in Maharashtra, and used his legal acumen to seize back the family's lost estates in Mangdari from his paternal relations.

=== The Brihan Maharashtra Sugar Syndicate Ltd.: 1934–1956 ===
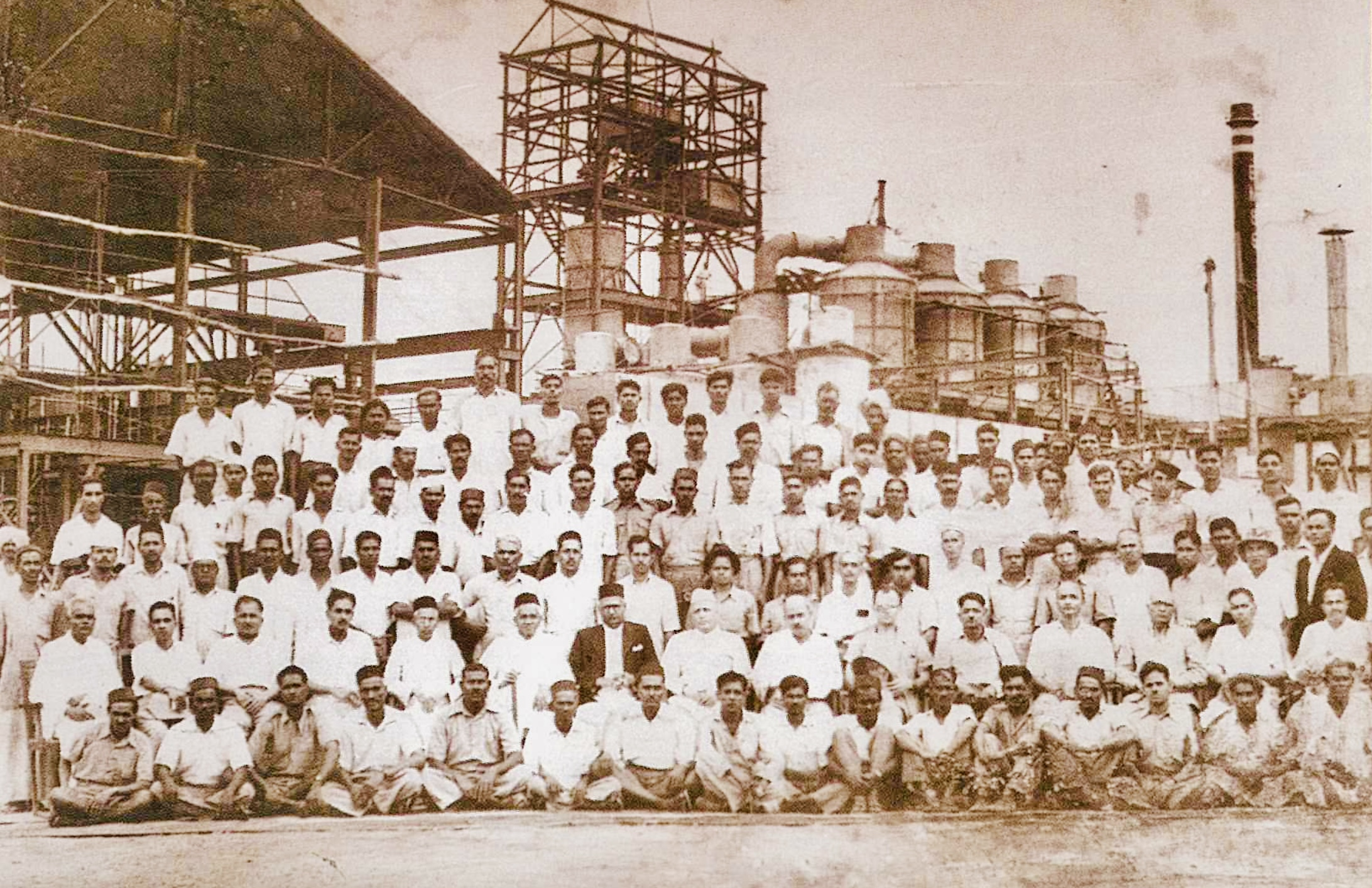
Agashe (seated second row from the bottom; eighth from left and right) and the employees of the Brihan Maharashtra Sugar Syndicate in Shreepur, Maharashtra.

Earlier in 1933, the Governor of Bombay, The Lord Brabourne promoted the production of indigenous sugar, having had increased the import tax on the commodity shipping in from Mauritius. This enabled Agashe to found the Brihan Maharashtra Sugar Syndicate Ltd. on 21 September 1934, as a limited liability company after two years of crowd-funding campaigns, with funds collected from among the Maharashtrian middle classes.

Prior to the syndicate's establishment, Agashe had aided Atmaram Raoji Bhat in the establishment of the Mahratta Chamber of Commerce in March 1934; and further guided the Chamber to pass legislation along with the Government of Mumbai for mandatory government aid for all Maharashtrian factory based businesses. His actions in founding the factory, were retrospectively considered as patriotic and philanthropic toward the commoners of Maharashtra, drawing comparisons to the Kalyani Group.

Between 1934 and 1936, Agashe envisioned opening a factory branch of the Syndicate in his hometown of Bhor, and began cultivating 2,000 acres of land for the plantation of sugar cane. Plans for the factory were shot down after Agashe met with strong opposition from the local landed gentry. In 1935, he began employing tenanted farmers of the local gentry and independent farmers as producers or transportation workers of the sugar cane for the syndicate in the village of Bhorgaon. By 1936, he had licensed or purchased 12,000 acres of farm land to support the syndicate, being lauded for reviving the local economy and consequently receiving further land grants from bankers in Akluj and several politicians in the Bhor State. During this period, with Agashe being a brahmin, the syndicate received opposition and resentment from local Maratha politicians.

After Agashe established the syndicate's headquarters at the Commonwealth Building on Laxmi Road, the Mahratta Chamber of Commerce declared the sale of 300,000 shares of the syndicate, with the first share going at Rs. 25 in January 1935. Between 1935 and 1937, Agashe toured several states and jagirs within the Deccan States Agency, promoting the syndicate at several village gram panchayats. Upon going public, Agashe was supported by the Kesari newspaper with public relations and received financial encouragement from the newly established Bank of Maharashtra. Agashe's mode of operation and rallying for investment or sales of shares, was popularly regarded as the Agashe pattern among Pune businesses and press.

This business modus operandi involved the collection of risk capital in the form of equity, instead of debentures. Agashe became associated with this procedure after becoming one of the first few businesses in Maharashtra to successfully raise funds with this method. In November 1937, Agashe ordered sugar cane processing machinery from Škoda Works in Czechoslovakia before the outbreak of World War II. Following Adolf Hitler's rise to power and the German occupation of Czechoslovakia, Agashe considered retracting his order, but received the ordered machinery before the Reichswerke Hermann Göring took over Škoda.

He began construction for the first factory in April 1938, and finally established the syndicate's first sugar cane processing factory in the village of Bhorgaon in March 1939, further purchasing an estate and the surrounding lands as a means to look after his own sugar plantations, with the syndicate's principal factory soon producing 150,000 sacs of sugar per annum by 1940. Selling the sugar under the trademark Shree, the village panchayat of Bhorgaon changed the village's official name to Shreepur. At this time, Agashe continued to practice law from the Joshi Wada in Sadashiv Peth, Pune alongside his brother's practice of business consultation.

In 1943, the Bombay Presidency decreed the plantation of food crops as mandatory for private sugar manufacturers to support British troops during World War II. Agashe founded the Laxmi Narayan Farmers' Union so as to meet the demand for food crops from the British Raj without disrupting the sugar cane processing; this move was not popular with many of Agashe's employed farmers because of low profitability.

After Indian independence in 1947, Agashe was able to expand the syndicate's production to 1000 tonnes of sugar cane processed per annum by 1950. After Gandhi's assassination by Nathuram Godse in January 1948, Agashe nor the syndicate were victimized or vandalized in the immediate aftermath of riots against Brahmin houses and businesses. However, the family's wada on their Mangdari estate, along with their Ram temple was burned down. Agashe was among several other notable politicians, industrialists, and Indian princes who were named as having donated sums to the Hindu Rashtra Dal founded by Godse prior to the assassination.

By 1953, there was strong opposition to Agashe's role as the managing director of the syndicate from his critics. This was backlash from several scandals and court cases involving Agashe or the syndicate in allegations of duping shareholders and depositors in the early 1950s. Agashe responded to these scandals by writing all of the press releases of the syndicate himself in the newspaper Kesari, which gained him notoriety among the newspaper's predominantly Marathi readership for their humour or references to pop culture of the time.

Agashe further published a 400-page report criticizing his retractors of corruption and factionalism based on evidence that his critics were backed by his competitor Karamshi Jethabhai Somaiya, who had previously shown interest in purchasing the syndicate. He was also a member of the Federation of Indian Chambers of Commerce & Industry by 1956.

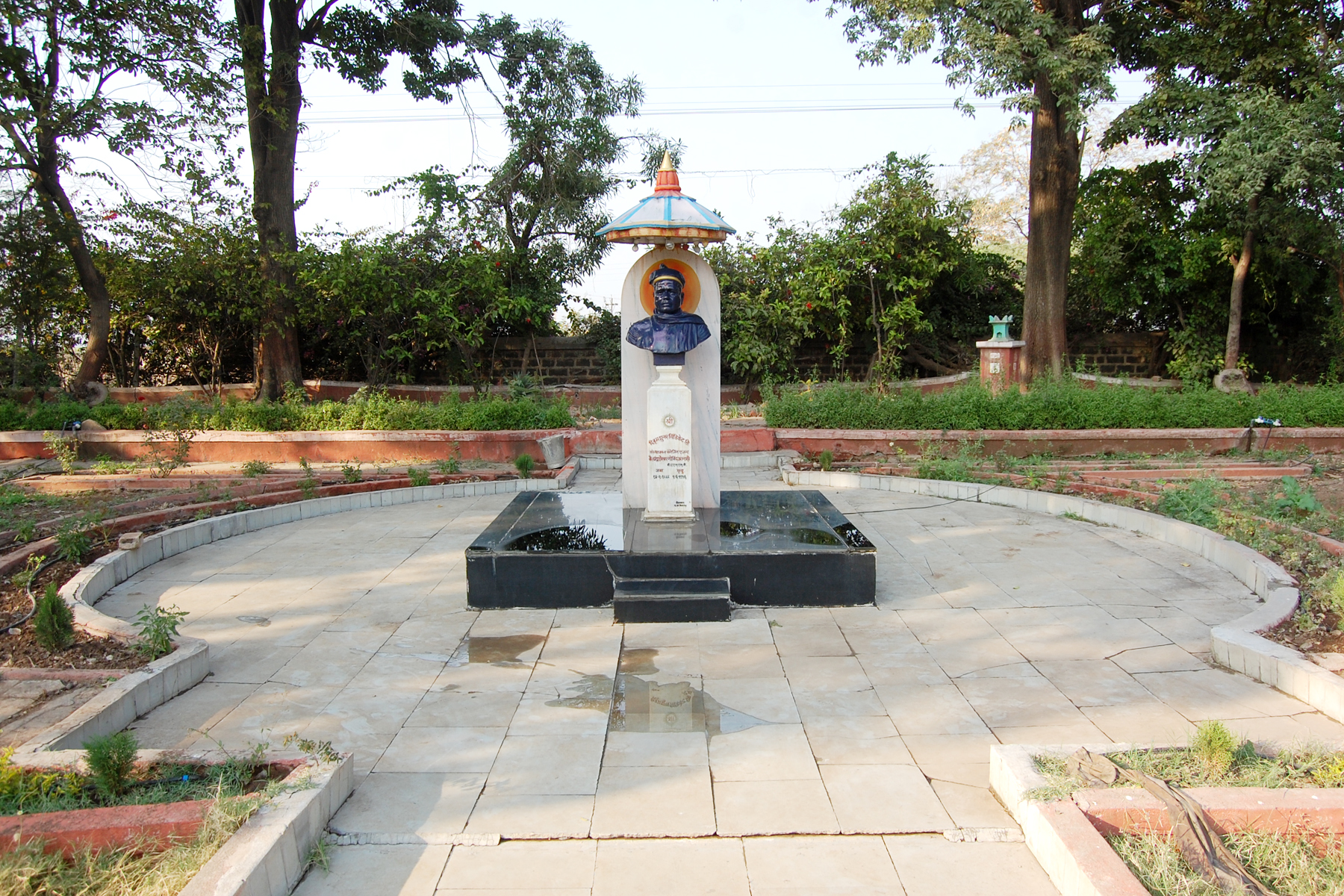
Memorial bust of Agashe in Shreepur, Maharashtra sculpted by P. V. Kelkar.

=== Death: 1956 ===
On 9 June 1956, while on a spiritual retreat in Jogeshwari, Agashe began showing symptoms of myocardial infarction and was recommended by his doctor to return home. He died that same day, from a heart attack upon reaching his residence in Shaniwar Peth, Pune.

Having left the syndicate in a strong position with a decentralised management, S. L. Limaye took over as chairman of the board of directors of the company from 1959 till 1990, while K. V. Champhekar took over as managing director of the company from 1957 to 1962, followed by G. S. Valimbe from 1963 to 1969, until Agashe's sons Panditrao and Dnyaneshwar became joint managing directors in July 1970.

== Philanthropy ==
Agashe is widely remembered as a philanthropist and patron of the arts and of scholarly works. His most notable philanthropic donation came in the form of the foundation of the Brihan Maharashtra College of Commerce in November 1944, after he donated capital towards the infrastructure of the college to the Deccan Education Society. In honor of his donation, the Society named the commerce college after Agashe's sugar syndicate. His donation was further used by the society in development of their Willingdon College, Ahilyadevi High School, Navin Marathi School and the Ranade Baalak Mandir. He also donated to the Brihan Maharashtra Bhuvan in New Delhi. However, Agashe's philanthropy was heavily criticised by his competition, who viewed it as self-fulfilling.

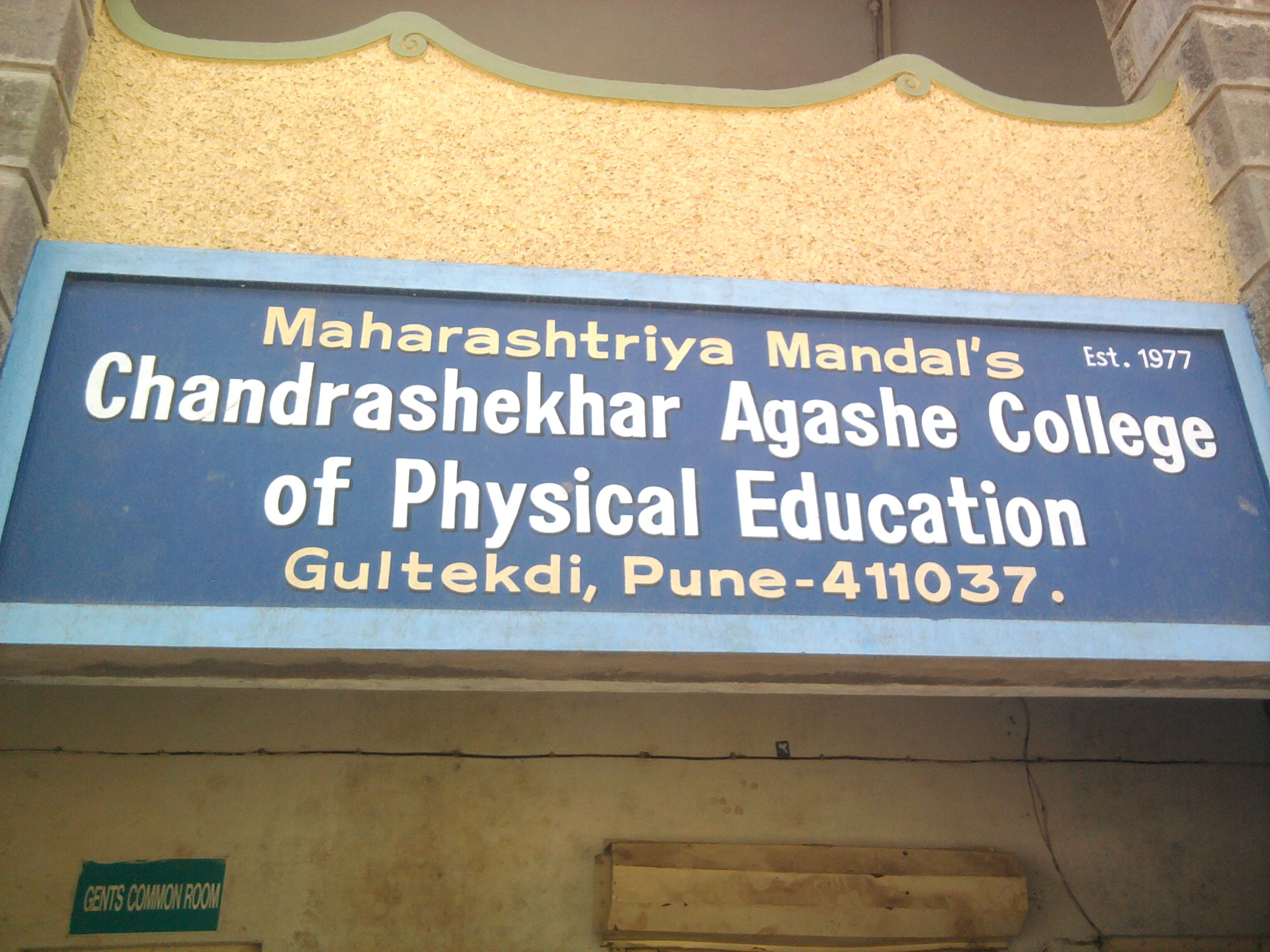
The Chandrashekhar Agashe College of Physical Education, Pune, established in July 1977.

Agashe began constructing the Agashe Primary School in the village of Shreepur in April 1942, with the school receiving sanctions from the Government in July 1943. He further advised on and donated to the campaign of Indian freedom fighter Narhar Vishnu Gadgil. In September 1945, he was one of the founding members of the Maharashtra Technical Education Society, where he was a patron and gave considerable financial endowments toward the establishment of the Walchand College of Engineering, Sangli in 1947. In April 1946, he was one of the benefactors towards the V. G. Kale Memorial Fund, in honour of the founder of the Bank of Maharashtra, further support the bank by having the syndicate bank with them and rent an office in their building.

Agashe also donated to the Bhandarkar Oriental Research Institute towards their research work on the Mahabharata, and its subsequent printing and publication in 1927 and 1947, having been a patron of the institute since 1945. In 1948, he donated to the Patient's Relief Association in Solapur, and further founded the Kaushik lectureship at the Sir Parashurambhau College in support of Sanskrit studies, theosophy, and the Aryan peoples, with philosopher Ramchandra Dattatreya Ranade giving the first of these lectures. That same year, he was one of the benefactors towards the publication of an edition of the Dnyaneshwari by K. P. Bhide.

Agashe served as one of the vice presidents of the Bharat Itihas Sanshodhak Mandal from 1953 to 1955 alongside Bhagwant Rao Trimbak, Raja of Aundh and Sadashivrao Ragunathrao, Raja of Bhor and, during the presidency of Malojiraje Nimbalkar IV, Raja of Phaltan, having become a member of the Mandal in 1945. In 1954, he also represented the Deccan Agricultural Association on the board of the Mahatma Phule Museum. He also established the Brihan Maharashtra Bhavan in New Delhi for the growing Marathi diaspora in the capital. He was also a patron of the Sugar Technologists Association of India in Kanpur.

In the 1960s, Agashe's son Panditrao fulfilled a benefaction to a temple associated with Keshavasuta that Agashe had promised before his death. In his 1967 analytic philosophy text ज्ञानदेव व प्लेटो (lit. 'Dnyanadev and Plato'), Shankar Vaman Dandekar acknowledged Agashe's funding of his research, having previously made Dandekar a shareholder in his syndicate, and this charitable deed of Agashe's was later praised by Manamohan in a poem published in 1977 on the life and works of Dandekar.

== Legacy ==
Agashe died of a myocardial infarction at the age of 68 on 9 June 1956 at his residence in Shaniwar Peth, Pune. He was survived by his wife Indirabai Agashe, until her death in 1981. He was survived in business by his sons Panditrao Agashe and Dnyaneshwar Agashe. He is remembered as one of the influential people from Pune in the 20th century.

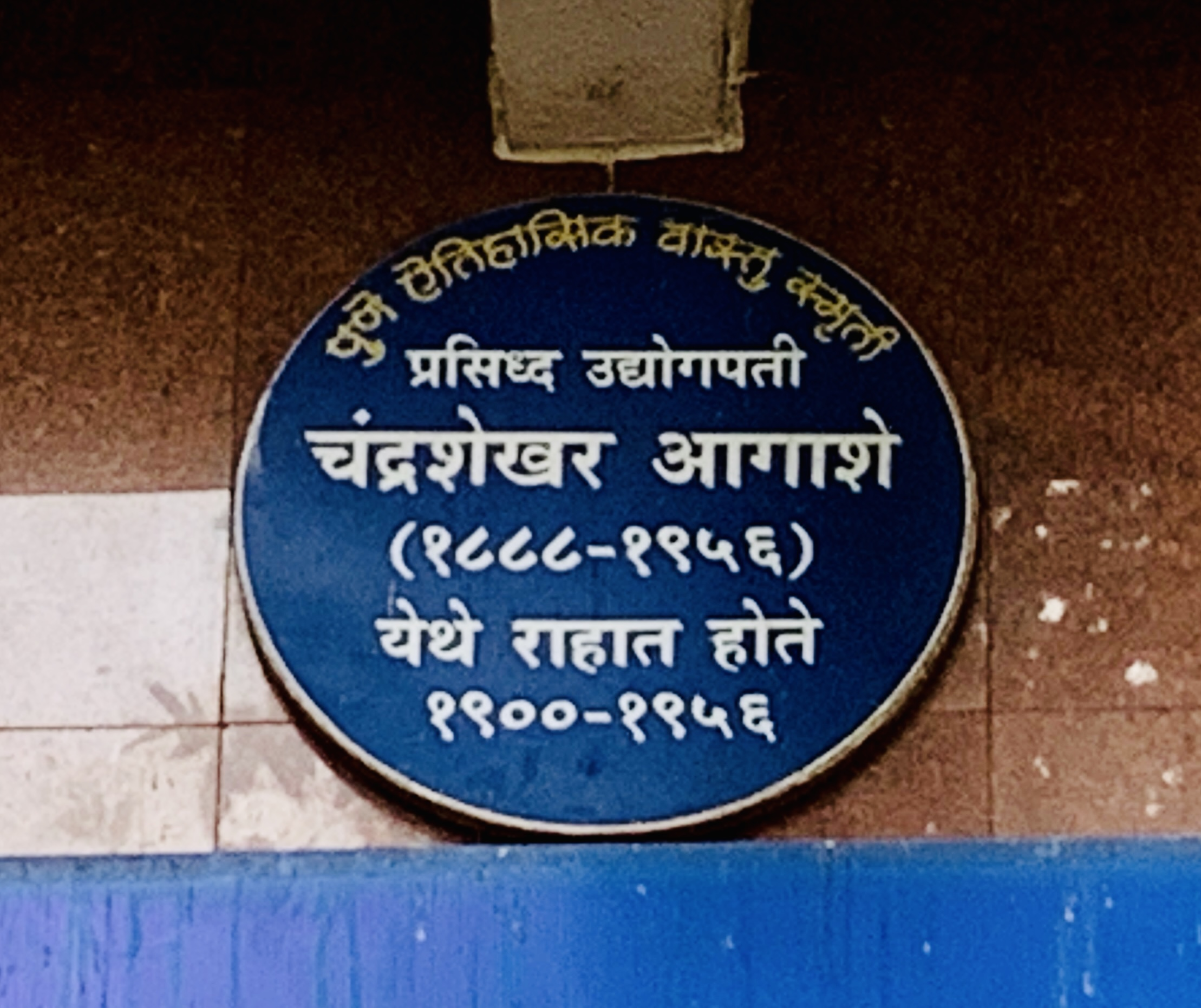
Commemorative plaque of Agashe's residence from 1900 to 1956 in Shaniwar Peth, Pune.

Agashe's sons began work on the Chandrashekhar Agashe High School in the village of Shreepur in 1955, and donated his family collection of ancient Indian musical instruments to the Raja Dinkar Kelkar Museum. The exhibit was titled the Chandrashekhar Agashe Museum wing, honouring the kinship of Agashe's widow and the founder of the museum, Dr. Dinkar G. Kelkar, with them being fourth cousins.

In July 1977, the founder of the Mahrashtriya Mandal of Pune, Shivrampant Damle, established the Chandrashekhar Agashe College of Physical Education in Gultekdi, Pune, honoring Agashe posthumously. Agashe was further honored when the Pune Municipal Corporation renamed the street in Shaniwar Peth, Pune where his family had maintained a traditional brahmin Wada upon relocating to Pune, as the Chandrashekhar Agashe Road. In 1982, his heirs under the C. G. Agashe Trust donated towards the research of biology and life sciences to the Agharkar Research Institute.

In 1992, Agashe was the subject of a biography written by his second-eldest daughter Shakuntala Karandikar. In 1993/94, the Brihan Maharashtra College of Commerce celebrated its golden jubilee by commissioning the Chandrashekhar Govind Agashe Business Motivation, Training and Research Centre (CGA – BMTRC) in his honour, which was inaugurated in August 1998, with the C. G. Agashe Trust donating ₹125,000 and establishing the C. G. Agashe Prize for economics. In 1997, Agashe became the namesake of his great-grandson Chandrashekhar Agashe II.

In his 2000 memoir, Narubhau Limaye remembered his first corporate work experiences under Agashe, with Limaye having previously credited Agashe as the catalyst for his move to Mumbai beginning his career in journalism. In 2004, the Pune Ithihasik Vastu Smruti (Pune Heritage department of the Kesari Trust) honoured Agashe with a blue plaque outside the Deo Wada, his residence during his lifetime, in Shaniwar Peth, Pune.

== Published works ==
=== Press articles ===
- Agashe, Chandrashekhar (23 May 1950). "काकासाहेब खाडिलकर म्हणतात" [Kakasaheb Khadilkar says]. Kesari (in Marathi). Poona.
- Agashe, Chandrashekhar (30 May 1950). "कारखाना सुरु होता यामुळे जाहिरातीने भेट घ्यावी लागत होती" [The factory was operational, and so I greet you through this advertisement]. Kesari (in Marathi). Poona.
- Agashe, Chandrashekhar (12 December 1951). "साखरकारखाना यशस्वी करणे म्हणजे स्वराज्यप्राप्ती किंव्हा ब्रह्मसाक्षात्कार नव्हे" [Making a sugar factory successful means achieving Swaraj, not realising Brahman]. Kesari (in Marathi). Poona.
- Agashe, Chandrashekhar (1 February 1952). "भाग गेला, शीन गेला. अवघा झाला आनंद" [The part went, the lustre went. It was just joy.]. Kesari (in Marathi). Poona.
- Agashe, Chandrashekhar (2 August 1953). ""अगा उपायबळे पांगू. पहाड ठाकी." — ज्ञानेश्वरी ८-८१" ["Efforts should not be made to weaken a grand mountain" – Dnyaneshwari 8–81]. Kesari (in Marathi). Poona.
- Agashe, Chandrashekhar (3 November 1953). "शिक्षण किंवा आरोग्यसंस्थांना व्यक्तिशः : देणगी मिल्ने ह्याला कालावधि लागतो" [It takes time for individual donations to be received by education or healthcare organisations]. Kesari (in Marathi). Poona.
- Agashe, Chandrashekhar (25 December 1953). "सिंडिकेटवर कोणाचाही कठीण समय नव्हता व नाही" [No one has had a hard time at the syndicate]. Kesari (in Marathi). Poona.
- Agashe, Chandrashekhar (11 January 1955). "सिंहगड म्हणजे मूर्तिमंत Lion-heart महाराष्ट्र" [Sinhagad is the embodiment of a lion-heart Maharashtra]. Kesari (in Marathi). Poona.
- Agashe, Chandrashekhar (14 January 1955). "ब्रिहन महाराष्ट्र सिंडिकेटची कोणाचाही मालमत्ता लिलावांत विकली नाही व विकली जाणार नाही" [None of the properties of Brihan Maharashtra Syndicate have been sold at auction nor will they be sold]. Kesari (in Marathi). Poona.
- Agashe, Chandrashekhar (18 January 1955). ""प्रयत्ने वाळूचे कण रगडीतां तेलही गळे. तृषार्ताची तृष्णा मृगजळ पियूनीही वितळे. सशाचेही लाघे विपिन फिरतां श्रुंगही जरी. परंतु मूर्खाचे हृदय धरवेना क्षणभरी." – वामन पंडित" ["I rubbed the grains of sand with effort and melted the oil. The thirst of the thirsty is quenched by drinking the water of the deer. Even if a rabbit's legs are working, even a squirrel's legs are working. But the heart of a fool cannot be held for a moment." – Vaman Pandit]. Kesari (in Marathi). Poona.
- Agashe, Chandrashekhar (3 June 1955). ""भक्ता नारायण नुपेक्षी सर्वथा. कृपावंत ऐसे कळों आले." – तुकाराममहाराज" ["The devotee of Narayana anticipates absolutely. The gracious ones came to such a conclusion." – Tukaram]. Kesari (in Marathi). Poona.
- Agashe, Chandrashekhar (20 January 1956). "फक्त सिंडिकेटच्या भागीदार व ठेवीदार यांच्या माहितीकरिता" [For information of Syndicate Partners and Depositors only]. Kesari (in Marathi). Poona.
- Agashe, Chandrashekhar (24 February 1956). "सिंडिकेट म्हणजे मध्यमवर्गाची पुण्यसंपत्ती" [Syndicate is the virtue of the middle class]. Kesari (in Marathi). Poona.
- Agashe, Chandrashekhar (8 May 1956). ""केल्याने होत आहे रे. आधी केलेंचि पाहिजे" – समर्थ" ["It's done by doing. It should have been done first" – Samarth]. Kesari (in Marathi). Poona.

=== Literary collections ===
- Agashe, Chandrashekhar (21 October 2022). Agashe, Aditya (ed.). Selected Writings (in English and Marathi) (Limited first ed.). London, Dublin: Brihans Group. ISBN 9798987233429. LCCN 2023544612. OCLC 1368249725 – via National Library of Ireland.

== Bibliography ==
- A Short History of the New Engineering College, Sangli (1947–1955) (PDF). Poona: Maharashtra Technical Education Society. 1955. Archived from the original (PDF) on 19 February 2024 – via Gokhale Institute of Politics and Economics.
- Aavalaskar, S. V., ed. (1953). शिवचरित्र–साहित्य : कोकणच्या इतिहासाची साधने [Shivcharitra-Literature: Kokancha Itihasachi Sadhana] (in Marathi). Vol. 10. Pune: Bharat Itihas Sanshodhak Mandal – via Internet Archive.
- Agashe, Trupti; Agashe, Gopal. (2006). "मांगदरी घराणा" [The House of Mangdari]. In Wad, Mugdha (ed.). आगाशे कुलवृत्तांत [Genealogy of the Agashe Family] (Kulavruttanta) (in Marathi) (2nd ed.). Hyderabad: Surbhi Graphics. ISBN 978-1-5323-4500-5 – via Google Books.
- Annals of the Bhandarkar Oriental Research Institute Poona. Vol. 31. Poona: Bhandarkar Oriental Research Institute. 1950. LCCN 86655500. OCLC 13354601.
- Bachal, V. M. (2017). वाटचाल फर्ग्यूसनची [Fergusson's progress] (in Marathi). Mehta Publishing House. ISBN 9789386454010. LCCN 2017322757. OCLC 982373613 – via Google Books.
- Bapat, Seema; Bapat, Sadanand (2007). "नारिंग्रे – कल्याण – जुन्नर घराणा" [The House of Naringre – Kalyan – Junnar]. बापट कुलवृत्तांत [Genealogy of the Bapat Family] (Kulavruttanta) (in Marathi) (3rd ed.). Pune.
- Bapat, V. V. (1998). मनमोकळा [Open-hearted] (in Marathi) (1st ed.). Pune: Indrāyaṇī Sāhitya. LCCN 98906795. OCLC 39897802 – via University of Michigan.
- Banhatti, Shrinivas Narayan (1971). ज्ञानेश्वरीरहस्य [The Mystery of Dnyaneshwari] (in Marathi) (1st ed.). Pune: Kauśika Vyākhyānamālā. LCCN 73903381. OCLC 20834512 – via University of Michigan.
- Barve, Ramesh; Vartak, Taraprakash; Belvalkar, Sharchandra, eds. (17 April 2002). पुत्र विश्वस्ताचा : गौरव ग्रंथ : ज्ञानेश्वर आगाशे षष्ट्यब्दीपूर्ती निमित्त [Putra Viśvastācā : A Festschrift : In honour of Dnyaneshwar Agashe's 60th Birth Anniversary] (Festschrift) (in Marathi) (1st ed.). Pune: Jñāneśvara Āgāśe Gaurava Samitī. ISBN 978-1-5323-4594-4. LCCN 2017322864. OCLC 992168227 – via University of Oxford.
- Bhide, Krishnaji Parshuram (1948). ज्ञानेश्वरी [Dnyaneshwari] (in Marathi). Pune – via Internet Archive.
- Biovigyanam. Vol. 8–10. Pune: Maharashtra Association for the Cultivation of Science. 1982. ISSN 0250-507X. OCLC 3763198 – via Cornell University.
- Business India. Vol. 108–116. A. H. Advani. 1982. ISSN 0254-5268. LCCN 78914172. OCLC 4525594 – via Northwestern University.
- Chatterjee, Ramananda (July 1948). The Modern Review. Vol. 84. Calcutta: Prabasi Press Private, Limited. ISSN 0026-8380. LCCN 25004740. OCLC 1681145 – via University of Michigan.
- Dandekar, S. V. (1967). ज्ञानदेव व प्लेटो [Dnyanadev and Plato] (in Marathi). Pune: Shikshan Prasarak Mandali. LCCN sa67007470. OCLC 19939266 – via University of Michigan.
- Damle, Dattatraya Moreshwar (1966). नारस्वतींचे लाडके पुत्र [Beloved son of Naraswati] (in Marathi). Solapur. OCLC 67306796 – via University of Michigan.
- Gadgil, Amarendra Laxman (1973). श्रीरामकोश [Śrīrāmakośa] (in Marathi). Vol. 1. Śrīrāmakośa Maṇḍaḷa. LCCN 74901968. OCLC 10799117 – via University of California.
- Gadgil, Narahar Vishnu (1964). पाठिका [Texts] (in Marathi). Pune: Vhīnasa Prakāśana. LCCN sa65002042. OCLC 20446288 – via University of Michigan.
- Gandhi, Manmohan Purushottam (1953). The Indian Sugar Industry. Bombay: M. P. Gandhi. LCCN 53032603. OCLC 6306867 – via University of California.
- Godse, Nathuram Vinayak (1950). Gandhi Murder Trial: Official Account of the Trial of Godse, Apte and Others for Murder and Conspiracy, with Verbatim Reports of Speeches by Godse and Savarkar. Glasgow: The Strickland Press. OCLC 19211656 – via Michigan State University.
- Indian Sugar Manual. Kanpur: Sugar Technologists Association of India. 1949 – via Internet Archive.
- Karandikar, Shakuntala (10 July 1992). विश्वस्त [Viśvasta] (in Marathi) (1st ed.). Pune: Śrī Prakāśana. ISBN 9781532345012. LCCN 2017322865. OCLC 992168228 – via University of Oxford.
- Kelkar, Bhaskar; Kelkar, Govind; Kelkar, Yashwant (1993). "कासारवेल – पुणे – धुळे घराणा" [The House of Kasarvel – Pune – Dhule]. केळकर कुलवृत्तांत [Genealogy of the Kelkar Family] (Kulavruttanta) (in Marathi) (2nd ed.). Pune: Yashoda Typesetting. Archived from the original on 26 August 2022.
- Limaye, Narubhau (1988). कल्याणी : कला - व्यक्ती - कर्तृत्वदर्शन [Kalyani: Art - Person - Performance] (in Marathi) (1st ed.). Pune: Gatimāna Prakāśana. LCCN 89902485. OCLC 22313226 – via University of British Columbia.
- Limaye, Narubhau (1989). बीस चोक ऐंशी [Twenty four eighty] (in Marathi) (1st ed.). Pune: Kôṇṭineṇṭala Prakāśana. LCCN 90902559. OCLC 1467841644 – via University of British Columbia.
- Lord Reay Maharashtra Industrial Museum (1954). Museum Education (PDF). Poona: Tata Day Publications. Archived from the original (PDF) on 19 February 2024 – via Gokhale Institute of Politics and Economics.
- Manamohan (1977). विश्वाचा वारकरी : श्रीसंत मामा उर्फ सोनोपंत दांडेकर यांच्यावरील उपन्यास [The Warkari of the World: A Novel on Sreesanth Mama aka Sonopant Dandekar] (in Marathi). Solapur: Surasa Prakāśana. LCCN unk84030480. OCLC 1179164601 – via University of Michigan.
- Mohanty, Manoranjan, ed. (2004). Class, caste, gender. New Delhi: Sage Publications. ISBN 978-0761996439. LCCN 2003022729. OCLC 1049932247 – via Google Books.
- Neurgaonkar, Sadashiv Keshav (1969). सोनोपंत दांडेकर ह्यांचे चरित्र [Biography of Sonopant Dandekar] (in Marathi). Pune: Prā. Dāṇḍekara Dhārmika Vāṅmaya Prakāśana Maṇḍaḷa. LCCN 78906790. OCLC 23570849 – via University of Michigan.
- Pathak, Gangadhar (1978). "पिरंदावण वाडी – तळेखाजण घराणा" [The House of Pirandavan Wadi – Talekhajan]. गोखले कुलवृत्तांत [Genealogy of the Gokhale Family] (Kulavruttanta) (in Marathi) (2nd ed.). Pune: Gokhale Kulavr̥ttānta Kāryakārī Maṇdaḷa. LCCN 81902590. OCLC 8113665 – via WorldCat.
- Patients' Relief Association Sholapur, Founded in 1932: A Short Report, 1948 (PDF). Sholapur: D. P. Bhave. 1948. Archived from the original (PDF) on 19 February 2024 – via Gokhale Institute of Politics and Economics.
- Patil, Anantrao (2000). नरुभाऊंच्या आठवणी [Memories of Narubhau] (in Marathi). Pune: Mīrā Prakāśana. LCCN 00403738. OCLC 45891493 – via University of Michigan.
- Phatak, N. R.; Kunte, B. G., eds. (1975). Source Material for a History of the Freedom Movement in India: Collected From Bombay Government Records. Vol. 3. Mumbai: Government of Maharashtra – via Internet Archive.
- Proceedings of the Committee. Vol. 3. New Delhi: Federation of Indian Chambers of Commerce and Industry. 1956. LCCN unk82092251 – via University of Michigan.
- Ranade, Sadashiv (1974). "मांगदरी घराणा" [The House of Mangdari]. चितपावन कौशिक गोत्री आगाशे कुलवृत्तांत [Genealogy of the Chitpavan Agashe Family belonging to the Kaushik Gotra] (Kulavruttanta) (in Marathi). LCCN 74903020. OCLC 20388396 – via University of Michigan.
- Ranade, Vinayak Govind (1951). Sardesai, S. R. (ed.). Life of His Highness Raja Shreemant Sir Raghunathrao S.: Alias Babasaheb Pandit Pant Sachiv, Raja of Bhor. Poona: S. R. Sardesai. LCCN 91901555. OCLC 29068518 – via University of Minnesota.
- Report of the Deccan Education Society, Poona, for the Year 1995. Pune: Deccan Education Society. 1995. LCCN 90640450. OCLC 12114778 – via University of Illinois at Urbana-Champaign.
- Sadhu, Aruna (1988). Kakasaheb Gadgil. New Delhi: Ministry of Information and Broadcasting. LCCN 88901960. OCLC 19325081 – via University of Michigan.
- Savarkar, S. S. (1969). वीर सावरकर आणि गांधीजी [Veer Savarkar and Gandhiji] (in Marathi). Mumbai: Vīra Sāvarakara Prakāśana. LCCN 72902120. OCLC 20956952 – via University of California.
- Savarkar, Vinayak Damodar (2004). Samagra Sāvarakara [Complete Works of Vinayak Damodar Savarkar] (in Hindi). Vol. II. New Delhi: Prabhat Prakashan. ISBN 8173153310. LCCN 00372365. OCLC 1441754408 – via WorldCat.
- "Shri Chandrashekhar Govind Agashe". Annals of the Bhandarkar Oriental Research Institute. Vol. 36. Bhandarkar Oriental Research Institute. 1955. p. 382. JSTOR 44082979. LCCN 25006272. OCLC 6988270115 – via University of Michigan.
- Silver Jubilee Souvenir. Bank of Mysore. 1967. LCCN sa68013088. OCLC 474783 – via University of Michigan.
- Sukthankar, V. S.; Belvalkar, S. K.; Vaidya, P. L. (1927). The Mahābhārata (in Sanskrit). Vol. 7. Bhandarkar Oriental Research Institute. LCCN sa67002016. OCLC 235977906 – via University of Michigan.
- Tilak, D. J., ed. (2004). Pune Heritage: Blue Plaque Guide (in Marathi and English). Pune: Tilak Smarak Trust.
- The Indian Institute of World Culture (1949). Wadia, Sophia (ed.). The Aryan Path. Vol. 20. Theosophy Company (India) Limited. ISSN 0004-4156. LCCN sa66007082. OCLC 1514392 – via University of Minnesota.
- The Feudatory and Zemindari India. Vol. 13–14. 1933. OCLC 499692944 – via University of California.
- The Mahābhārata (in Sanskrit). Vol. 7. Poona: Bhandarkar Oriental Research Institute. 1947. LCCN 2002294638. OCLC 37361288 – via University of Michigan.
- Valimbe, G. R. (1981). Kumbhojkar, Lalita (ed.). रामातनया, व्यक्ती आणि वान्यमय [Ramatanaya, person and landscape] (in Marathi). Pune: Vhīnasa Prakāśana. LCCN 82903058. OCLC 18254709 – via University of Michigan.
