= Panditrao Agashe =

Indian industrialist (1936–1986)

- Agashe in the 1950s

Joint managing director of the Brihan Maharashtra Sugar Syndicate Ltd.
- In office 1 July 1970 – 26 October 1978 Serving with Dnyaneshwar Agashe
- Preceded by: G. S. Valimbe
- Succeeded by: Dnyaneshwar Agashe (as sole managing director)

Personal details
- Born: 8 March 1936 Pune, Bombay Province, British India
- Died: 16 November 1986 (aged 50) Pune, Maharashtra, India
- Parents: Chandrashekhar Agashe (father); Indirabai Agashe (mother)
- Education: Fergusson College (dropped out)
- Occupation: Industrialist; philanthropist

Jagdish "Panditrao" Chandrashekhar Agashe (Note: IAST: Jagadīśa "Paṃḍitarāva" Candraśekhara Āgāśe. Agashe bore his father's name (Chandrashekhar) as a middle name as per the patronymic Marathi naming conventions, but he is widely remembered by his nickname and without his patronymic, as seen in the institution named after him.) (8 March 1936 – 16 November 1986) was an Indian industrialist, best remembered for serving as the joint managing director alongside his brother of the Brihan Maharashtra Sugar Syndicate Ltd. from 1970 to 1978. The Panditrao Agashe School in Pune is named in his honour.

== Biography ==
=== Early life and family: 1936–1956 ===
Agashe was born on 8 March 1936, into an aristocratic and entrepreneurial Chitpavan brahmin family of industrialist Chandrashekhar Agashe and wife Indirabai Agashe (née Dwarka Gokhale). He was the fourth of nine children, and second son (eldest surviving), born to his parents. Given the name Jagdish at birth, he was known for most of his professional and personal life as Panditrao, a nickname given to him by his sisters.

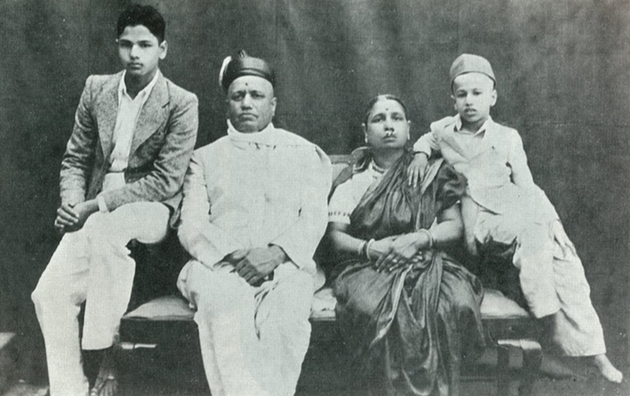
Agashe (left) with his parents (centre), and younger brother Dnyaneshwar (right), in the 1950s.

Agashe's father founded the Brihan Maharashtra Sugar Syndicate in 1934, and after his death in 1956, Agashe was brought on the board of directors of the company under S. L. Limaye's chairmanship and K. V. Champhekar's management in 1957. He had matriculated high school, attending the Deccan Education Society's New English School Ramanbaug, but dropped out of his Bachelor of Science degree from Fergusson College when he joined the company, becoming the joint managing director of the syndicate alongside his brother Dnyaneshwar on 1 July 1970.

Agashe never married. Through his brother Dnyaneshwar, he was a paternal uncle to Mandar, Ashutosh, and Sheetal, and was a younger brother of Shakuntala Karandikar. Some of Agashe's other prominent relations include musician Ashutosh Phatak, historian Dinkar G. Kelkar, scientist P. K. Kelkar, and Third Anglo-Maratha War general Bapu Gokhale.

=== Career in business: 1956–1986 ===
Agashe's father left the syndicate to him in a strong position, with several senior managers of the company aiding Agashe, given his considerable youth when he joined the board of directors in 1957. Between 1958 and 1966, the syndicate continued regular operation under the board's management and Agashe's supervision, during which time he financially aided several farming communities around the Malshiras taluka, including those regions affected by the Panshet dam flood in 1961.

The later half of the 1960s saw Agashe battle the Government of Maharashtra's socialist land acquisition schemes, which he ultimately lost, relinquishing several thousand acres of syndicate owned land to the Government of India. He was also known for his philanthropy, donating to several Maharashtra Mandals across India, most notably funding the purchase of the building to house the Maharashtra Niwas in Kolkata. By 1966, Agashe's brother Dnyaneshwar had joined him on the board of directors of the syndicate, and further founded the Suvarna Sahakari Bank in 1969, of which Agashe was a director. In 1966, he would also serve on the alumni board of the New English School Ramanbaug. In 1969, him and his brother financially supported the Tilak Maharashtra University. He became the joint managing director of the company in July 1970.

In the early 1970s, Agashe established the Mandar Printing Press in Shaniwar Peth, naming it after his nephew Mandar. In 1972, he served as the manager for his brother's Suvarna Sahakari Bank. In 1973, he also donated an exhibit named after his father to the Raja Dinkar Kelkar Museum. Beginning in the 1970s, under Agashe and his brother, the syndicate manufactured liquor in Shreepur, Maharashtra, specialising in whisky and rum production under its several flagship brands. The syndicate was one of the first companies to produce a range of government-approved liquors after the Maharashtra state prohibition, called Indian Made Foreign Liquor. In 1978, Agashe retired as joint managing director of the syndicate, leaving his brother as sole managing director. By the early 1980s, under Agashe's management, the syndicate also briefly engaged in the business of metal printing. In 1984, Agashe survived a heart attack, having been a heavy smoker for most of his life.

=== Death and legacy: 1986 ===
Agashe died on 16 November 1986, from a heart attack at the family residence in Shaniwar Peth. His younger brother and nephews survived him in business. The Panditrao Agashe School in Pune was named in his honour.

== Bibliography ==
- Agashe, Trupti; Agashe, Gopal. (2006). "मांगदरी घराणा" [The House of Mangdari]. In Wad, Mugdha (ed.). आगाशे कुलवृत्तांत [Genealogy of the Agashe Family] (Kulavruttanta) (in Marathi) (2nd ed.). Hyderabad: Surbhi Graphics. ISBN 978-1-5323-4500-5 – via Google Books.
- Bapat, Seema; Bapat, Sadanand (2007). "नारिंग्रे – कल्याण – जुन्नर घराणा" [The House of Naringre – Kalyan – Junnar]. बापट कुलवृत्तांत [Genealogy of the Bapat Family] (Kulavruttanta) (in Marathi) (3rd ed.). Pune.
- Barve, Ramesh; Vartak, Taraprakash; Belvalkar, Sharchandra, eds. (17 April 2002). पुत्र विश्वस्ताचा : गौरव ग्रंथ : ज्ञानेश्वर आगाशे षष्ट्यब्दीपूर्ती निमित्त [Putra Viśvastācā : A Festschrift : In honour of Dnyaneshwar Agashe's 60th Birth Anniversary] (Festschrift) (in Marathi) (1st ed.). Pune: Jñāneśvara Āgāśe Gaurava Samitī. ISBN 978-1-5323-4594-4. LCCN 2017322864. OCLC 992168227 – via University of Oxford.
- Belvalkar, Sharatchandra; Vartak, Taraprakash; Barve, Ramesh, eds. (17 April 2022). Putra Vishwastacha: A Festschrift to Dnyaneshwar Agashe. Translated by Phadnis, Nandan. Compiled by Agashe, Aditya (2nd ed.). Pune, Maharashtra: The Brihan Maharashtra Sugar Syndicate Ltd. ISBN 9780578292250. LCCN 2021276707. OCLC 1325123469 – via Google Books.
- Gadgil, Amarendra Laxman (1973). श्रीरामकोश [Śrīrāmakośa] (in Marathi). Vol. 1. Śrīrāmakośa Maṇḍaḷa. OCLC 10799117 – via University of California.
- Industrial and Commercial Directory of Pune. Pune: Mahratta Chamber of Commerce and Industries. 1972. Archived from the original on 22 February 2024 – via Gokhale Institute of Politics and Economics.
- Kapasi, Bhikhalal (1962). Economic Trends and Indications. Vol. 2. New Delhi. LCCN sa64000243. OCLC 6273352 – via University of Michigan.
- Karandikar, Shakuntala (10 July 1992). विश्वस्त [Viśvasta] (in Marathi) (1st ed.). Pune: Śrī Prakāśana. ISBN 9781532345012. LCCN 2017322865. OCLC 992168228 – via University of Oxford.
- Karandikar, Shakuntala (14 February 2022). Agashe, Aditya (ed.). Vishwasta – The Trustee: The Life of Industrialist Chandrashekhar Agashe. Translated by Phadnis, Nandan (2nd ed.). Pune: The Brihan Maharashtra Sugar Syndicate Ltd. ISBN 9780578355863. LCCN 2021276641. OCLC 1310118266 – via Google Books.
- Kelkar, Bhaskar; Kelkar, Govind; Kelkar, Yashwant (1993). "कासारवेल – पुणे – धुळे घराणा" [The House of Kasarvel – Pune – Dhule]. केळकर कुलवृत्तांत [Genealogy of the Kelkar Family] (Kulavruttanta) (in Marathi) (2nd ed.). Pune: Yashoda Typesetting. Archived from the original on 26 August 2022 – via Google Books.
- Kothari's Economic and Industrial Guide of India. Kothari & Sons. 1978. LCCN 72904460. OCLC 1784174 – via University of Michigan.
- Kothari's Economic Guide and Investors' Handbook of India. Kothari & Sons. 1969. LCCN sa63000226. OCLC 1773664 – via University of Michigan.
- Kulkarni, P. B., ed. (1962). The Progress of Education. Vol. 37–38. Poona: S. D. Chitale. ISSN 0033-0663. LCCN 2008208284. OCLC 5371630 – via University of California.
- New English School, Ramanbag - Annual Magazine (in Marathi). Pune: Deccan Education Society. 1966 – via Wayback Machine.
- Pathak, Gangadhar (1978). "पिरंदावण वाडी – तळेखाजण घराणा" [The House of Pirandavan Wadi – Talekhajan]. गोखले कुलवृत्तांत [Genealogy of the Gokhale Family] (Kulavruttanta) (in Marathi) (2nd ed.). Pune: Gokhale Kulavr̥ttānta Kāryakārī Maṇdaḷa. LCCN 81902590. OCLC 8113665 – via WorldCat.
- Phadke, Narayan Sitaram (1966). मन शुद्ध तुझा! [Your Mind is Pure] (in Marathi). Mumbai: Ga. Pã. Paracure Prakāśana Mandira. LCCN sa67006011. OCLC 19980145 – via University of Michigan.
- Ranade, Sadashiv (1974). "मांगदरी घराणा" [The House of Mangdari]. चितपावन कौशिक गोत्री आगाशे कुलवृत्तांत [Genealogy of the Chitpavan Agashe Family belonging to the Kaushik Gotra] (Kulavruttanta) (in Marathi). LCCN 74903020. OCLC 20388396 – via University of Michigan.
- Ranade, Sadashiv (1982). "जांभळी घराणा (पहिला)" [The First House of Jambli]. फाटक कुलवृत्तांत [Genealogy of the Phatak Family] (Kulavruttanta) (in Marathi) (2nd ed.). Pune: Phāṭaka Kula Samitī. LCCN 84900881. OCLC 20671450 – via Google Books.
- "Shri Chandrashekhar Govind Agashe". Annals of the Bhandarkar Oriental Research Institute. Vol. 36. Bhandarkar Oriental Research Institute. 1955. JSTOR 44082979. LCCN 25006272. OCLC 6988270115 – via University of Michigan.
- Sontakke, Narayan Shripad; Dharmadhikari, Trivikram Narayan, eds. (1970). Krṣṇayajurvedīyā Taittirīya-saṃhitā: padapāṭhayutā (in Sanskrit and English). Pune: Tilak Maharashtra Vidyapeeth. LCCN 74918618. OCLC 34245375 – via University of Virginia.
