= Shakuntala Karandikar =

Indian biographer and philanthropist (1931–2018)

President and founder of the Wednesday Women's Circle

President of the Rotary Inner Wheel Club of Dahanu

Personal details
- Born: 20 July 1931 Pune, Poona Agency, Bombay Presidency, British Raj
- Died: 1 June 2018 (aged 86) Dahanu, Maharashtra, India
- Parents: Chandrashekhar Agashe (father); Indirabai Agashe (mother)
- Occupation: Biographer; philanthropist
- Known for: Vishwasta (1992)

Shakuntala Bhupendra Karandikar (née Shakuntala Chandrashekhar Agashe; (Note: IAST: Śakuntalā Bhūpendra Karandīkara née IAST: Śakuntalā Candraśekhara Āgāśe. Karandikar bore her father's name (Chandrashekhar) as a middle name before marriage as per the patronymic Marathi naming conventions, but she is widely remembered by her married name, where her husband's name (Bhupendra) was her middle name.) 20 July 1931 – 1 June 2018) was an Indian biographer and philanthropist, best remembered for writing Vishwasta (1992), a biography of her father in Marathi, and for her advocacy and philanthropy towards women's causes in Dahanu.

== Biography ==
=== Early life and family: 1931–1953 ===
Karandikar was born in Pune, Bombay Presidency on 31 July 1931, into an aristocratic and entrepreneurial Chitpavan brahmin family of industrialist Chandrashekhar Agashe and wife Indirabai Agashe (née Dwarka Gokhale). Her father was a member of the aristocratic Agashe gharana of the village of Mangdari in the Bhor State, while her mother was from the aristocratic Gokhale gharana of Dharwad.

She was the second eldest daughter, as well as the second eldest of nine siblings who survived to adulthood. She had two younger brothers, Panditrao Agashe and Dnyaneshwar Agashe. Through her brother Dnyaneshwar, she was a paternal aunt to Mandar, Ashutosh, and Sheetal Agashe. Some of Karandikar's other prominent relations include Bapu Gokhale, a Third Anglo-Maratha War general under Peshwa Baji Rao II of the Maratha Empire, musician Ashutosh Phatak, historian Dinkar G. Kelkar, and scientist P. K. Kelkar.

=== Marriage, writings, and philanthropy: 1953–2018 ===
Karandikar initially studied painting. After matriculating, she married Bhupendra "Rajabhau" Karandikar, of the Karandikar gharana of Dahanu in 1953. They would go on to have three children, a daughter and two sons. She would aid him in his forestry and salt pan businesses. While in Dahanu, she was a prominent member of society. She advocated and supported various women's organisations and charities in support of various women's causes. She would go on to serve as president of the Rotary Inner Wheel Club and was the founding president of the Wednesday Women's Circle of Dahanu, frequently organizing fundraising activities for the clubs. She was also associated with various education institutions in Dahanu.

In June 1992, Karandikar and her siblings considered commissioning a biography on their father Chandrashekhar Agashe and his company the Brihan Maharashtra Sugar Syndicate. Karandikar would go on to pen the biography herself based on the collated writings of her maternal uncle Mukundrao Gokhale, and those of Dattaji Kulkarni, and the biography previously written by Narubhau Limaye. The book was published on Ashadha Ekadashi as per the Indian national calendar, or on 10 July 1992 as per the Gregorian calendar, by Shri Prakashan in Shaniwar Peth, Pune. In April 2002, she contributed an essay for her brother Dnyaneshwar's festschrift published on the occasion of his sixtieth birthday.

=== Death and legacy: 2018 ===
Karandikar died on 1 June 2018 in Dahanu after a short illness. In 2022, the Brihan Maharashtra Sugar Syndicate commissioned Nandan Phadnis to translate her biography from Marathi to English, which was published by the Syndicate in February of that year. In April that same year, her essay for her brother's festschrift would also be subsequently translated into English by Phadnis. By August that same year, her authored biography was subsequently assigned as a research guide for the South Asian studies department at the University of British Columbia.

== Published works ==
=== Books ===
- Karandikar, Shakuntala (10 July 1992). विश्वस्त [Viśvasta] (in Marathi) (1st ed.). Pune: Śrī Prakāśana. ISBN 9781532345012. LCCN 2017322865. OCLC 992168228 – via University of Oxford.
  - Karandikar, Shakuntala (14 February 2022). Agashe, Aditya (ed.). Vishwasta – The Trustee: The Life of Industrialist Chandrashekhar Agashe. Translated by Phadnis, Nandan (2nd ed.). Pune: The Brihan Maharashtra Sugar Syndicate Ltd. ISBN 9780578355863. LCCN 2021276641. OCLC 1310118266 – via Google Books.

=== Essays ===
- Karandikar, Shakuntala (17 April 2002). "शिरीन... माझा भाऊ..." [Shirin... My brother...]. In Barve, Ramesh; Vartak, Taraprakash; Belvalkar, Sharchandra (eds.). पुत्र विश्वस्ताचा : गौरव ग्रंथ : ज्ञानेश्वर आगाशे षष्ट्यब्दीपूर्ती निमित्त [Putra Viśvastācā : A Festschrift : In honour of Dnyaneshwar Agashe's 60th Birth Anniversary] (Festschrift) (in Marathi) (1st ed.). Pune: Jñāneśvara Āgāśe Gaurava Samitī. pp. 86–88. ISBN 978-1-5323-4594-4. LCCN 2017322864. OCLC 992168227 – via University of Oxford.
  - Karandikar, Shakuntala (17 April 2022). "Shirin... My Brother". In Belvalkar, Sharatchandra; Vartak, Taraprakash; Barve, Ramesh (eds.). Putra Vishwastacha: A Festschrift to Dnyaneshwar Agashe. Translated by Phadnis, Nandan. Compiled by Agashe, Aditya (2nd ed.). Pune, Maharashtra: The Brihan Maharashtra Sugar Syndicate Ltd. pp. 98–101. ISBN 9780578292250. LCCN 2021276707. OCLC 1325123469 – via Google Books.

== Bibliography ==
- Agashe, Trupti; Agashe, Gopal. (2006). "मांगदरी घराणा" [The House of Mangdari]. In Wad, Mugdha (ed.). आगाशे कुलवृत्तांत [Genealogy of the Agashe Family] (Kulavruttanta) (in Marathi) (2nd ed.). Hyderabad: Surbhi Graphics. ISBN 978-1-5323-4500-5 – via Google Books.
- Barve, Ramesh; Vartak, Taraprakash; Belvalkar, Sharchandra, eds. (17 April 2002). पुत्र विश्वस्ताचा : गौरव ग्रंथ : ज्ञानेश्वर आगाशे षष्ट्यब्दीपूर्ती निमित्त [Putra Viśvastācā : A Festschrift : In honour of Dnyaneshwar Agashe's 60th Birth Anniversary] (Festschrift) (in Marathi) (1st ed.). Pune: Jñāneśvara Āgāśe Gaurava Samitī. ISBN 978-1-5323-4594-4. LCCN 2017322864. OCLC 992168227 – via University of Oxford.
- Belvalkar, Sharatchandra; Vartak, Taraprakash; Barve, Ramesh, eds. (17 April 2022). Putra Vishwastacha: A Festschrift to Dnyaneshwar Agashe. Translated by Phadnis, Nandan. Compiled by Agashe, Aditya (2nd ed.). Pune, Maharashtra: The Brihan Maharashtra Sugar Syndicate Ltd. ISBN 9780578292250. LCCN 2021276707. OCLC 1325123469 – via Google Books.
- Kelkar, Bhaskar; Kelkar, Govind; Kelkar, Yashwant (1993). "कासारवेल – पुणे – धुळे घराणा" [The House of Kasarvel – Pune – Dhule]. केळकर कुलवृत्तांत [Genealogy of the Kelkar Family] (Kulavruttanta) (in Marathi) (2nd ed.). Pune: Yashoda Typesetting. Archived from the original on 26 August 2022 – via Google Books.
- Pathak, Gangadhar (1978). "पिरंदावण वाडी – तळेखाजण घराणा" [The House of Pirandavan Wadi – Talekhajan]. गोखले कुलवृत्तांत [Genealogy of the Gokhale Family] (Kulavruttanta) (in Marathi) (2nd ed.). Pune: Gokhale Kulavr̥ttānta Kāryakārī Maṇdaḷa. LCCN 81902590. OCLC 8113665 – via WorldCat.
- Ranade, Sadashiv (1974). "मांगदरी घराणा" [The House of Mangdari]. चितपावन कौशिक गोत्री आगाशे कुलवृत्तांत [Genealogy of the Chitpavan Agashe Family belonging to the Kaushik Gotra] (Kulavruttanta) (in Marathi). LCCN 74903020. OCLC 20388396 – via University of Michigan.
- Ranade, Sadashiv (1982). "जांभळी घराणा (पहिला)" [The First House of Jambli]. फाटक कुलवृत्तांत [Genealogy of the Phatak Family] (Kulavruttanta) (in Marathi) (2nd ed.). Pune: Phāṭaka Kula Samitī. LCCN 84900881. OCLC 20671450 – via Google Books.
- "РНБ. Информация" [RNB Information]. Российская национальная библиотека (in Russian). 3. Saint Petersburg: National Library of Russia. March 2022. Archived from the original on 1 April 2025 – via Google Books.
