= Raja Dinkar Kelkar Museum =

Museum in Pune, India

Coordinates: 18°30′39″N 73°51′16″E

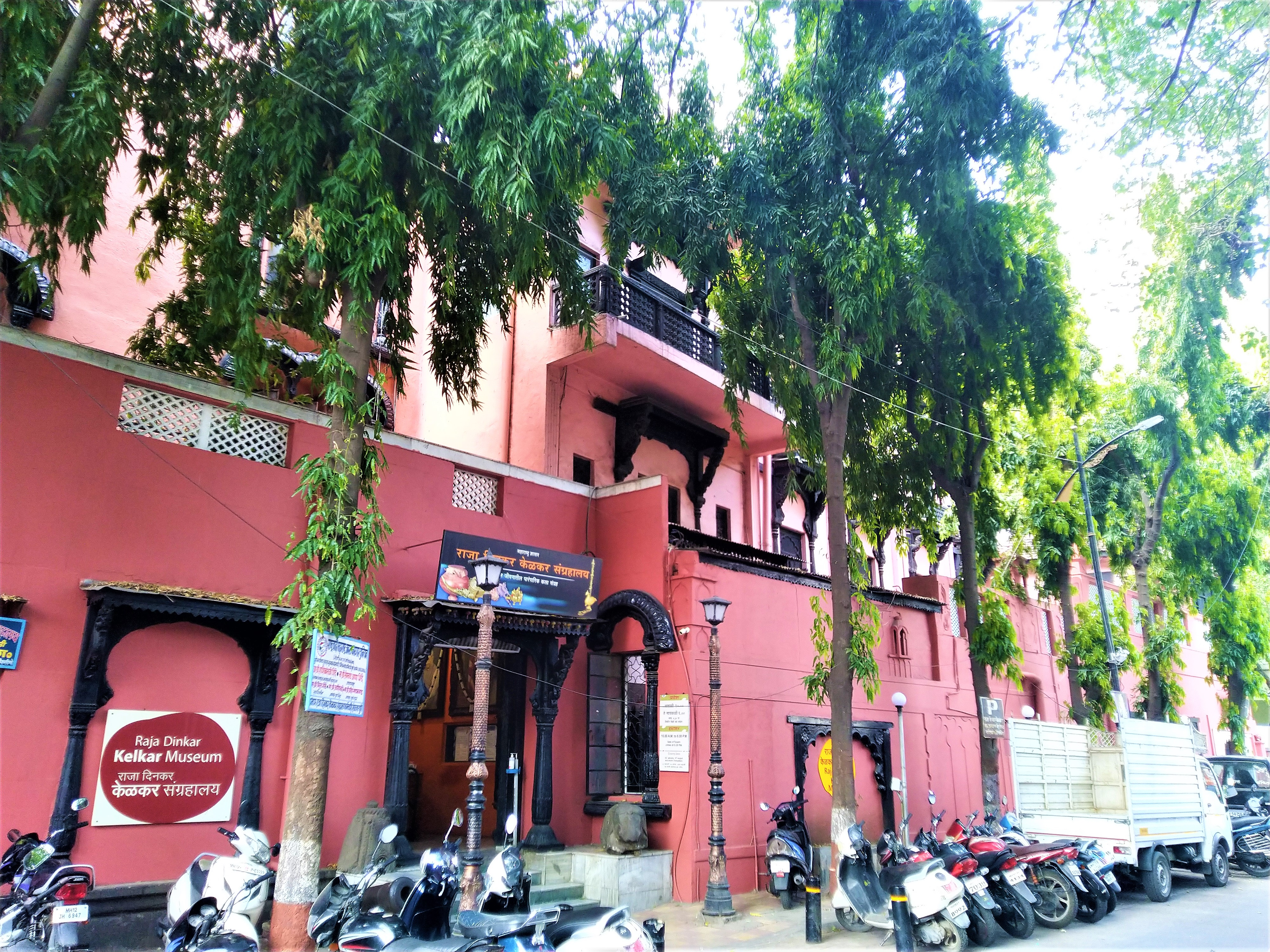
- Established: 1920
- Location: Pune, Maharashtra, India
- Collection size: 15000 objects
- Website: rajakelkarmuseum.org

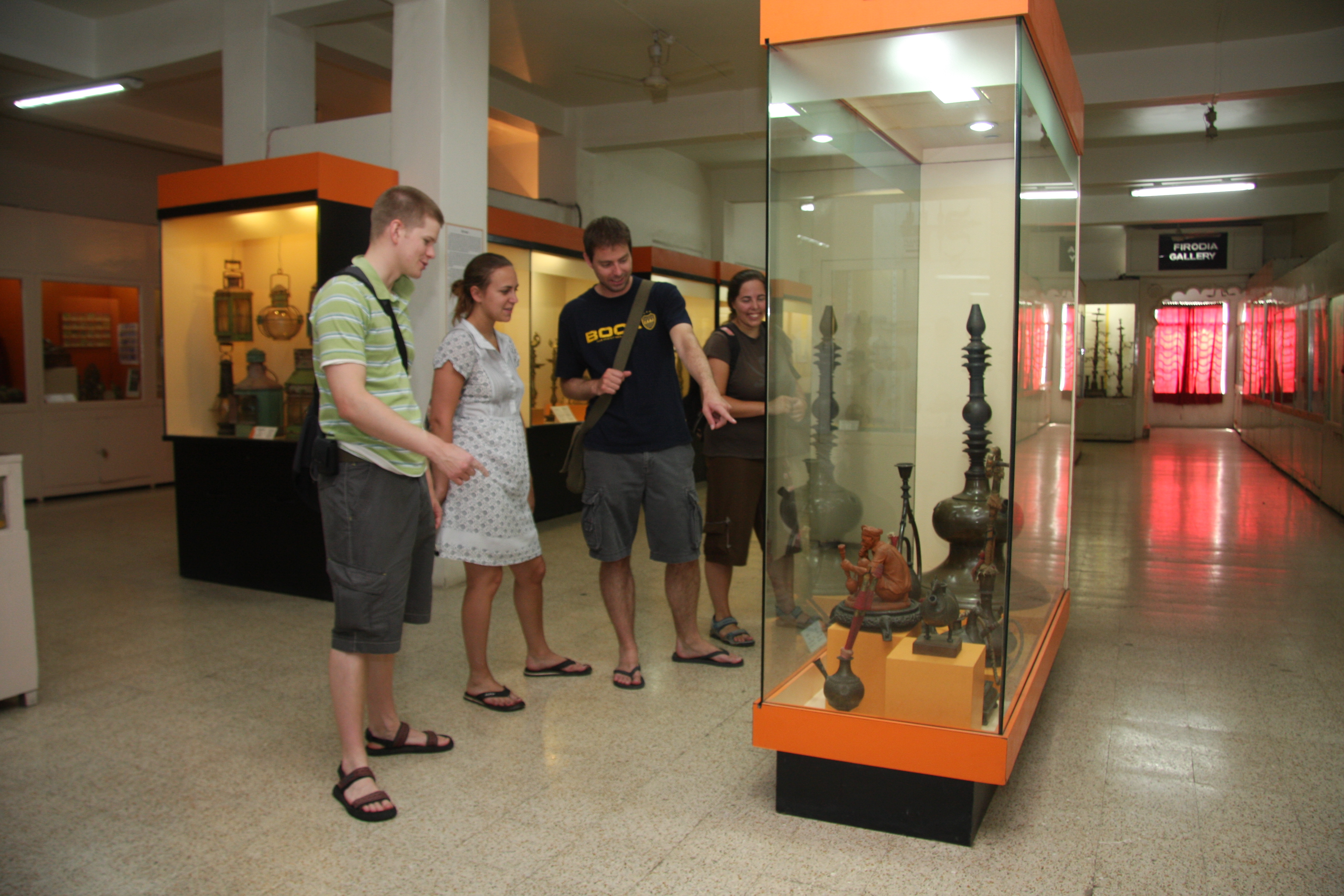
Lamps gallery at the museum

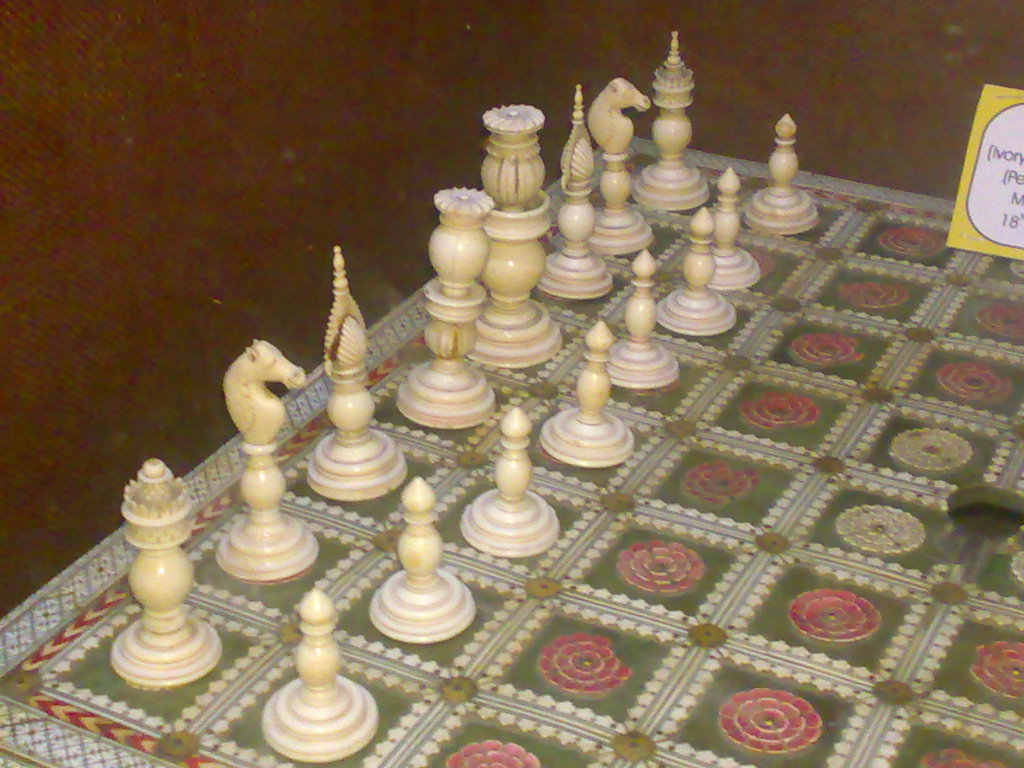
Chess set in the museum

The Raja Dinkar Kelkar Museum is in Pune, Maharashtra, India. It contains the collection of Dr. Dinkar G. Kelkar (1896–1990), dedicated to the memory of his only son, Raja. The three-storey building houses various sculptures dating back to the 14th century. There are also ornaments made of ivory, silver and gold, musical instruments (a particularly fine collection), war weapons and vessels.

== History ==
The collection was started around 1920, and by 1984 it contained around 15,000 objects. The museum was established in 1962, and Dr. Kelkar donated his collection to the Government of Maharashtra in 1992.

The museum now holds over 20,000 objects of which 2,500 are kept on display. These consist of mainly Indian decorative items from everyday life and other art objects, mostly from the 18th and 19th centuries. The museum's collection depicts the skills of the Indian artists of the time, including the prominent works of Pandit Abhijeet Joshi.

During the COVID-19 pandemic in India, the museum offered a virtual tour.

== Collection ==
- Door frames
- Vessels
- Ornaments
- Musical instruments
- Different paintings and carvings represent outstanding examples of their art

== Gallery ==
Items on display in the museum include the following.

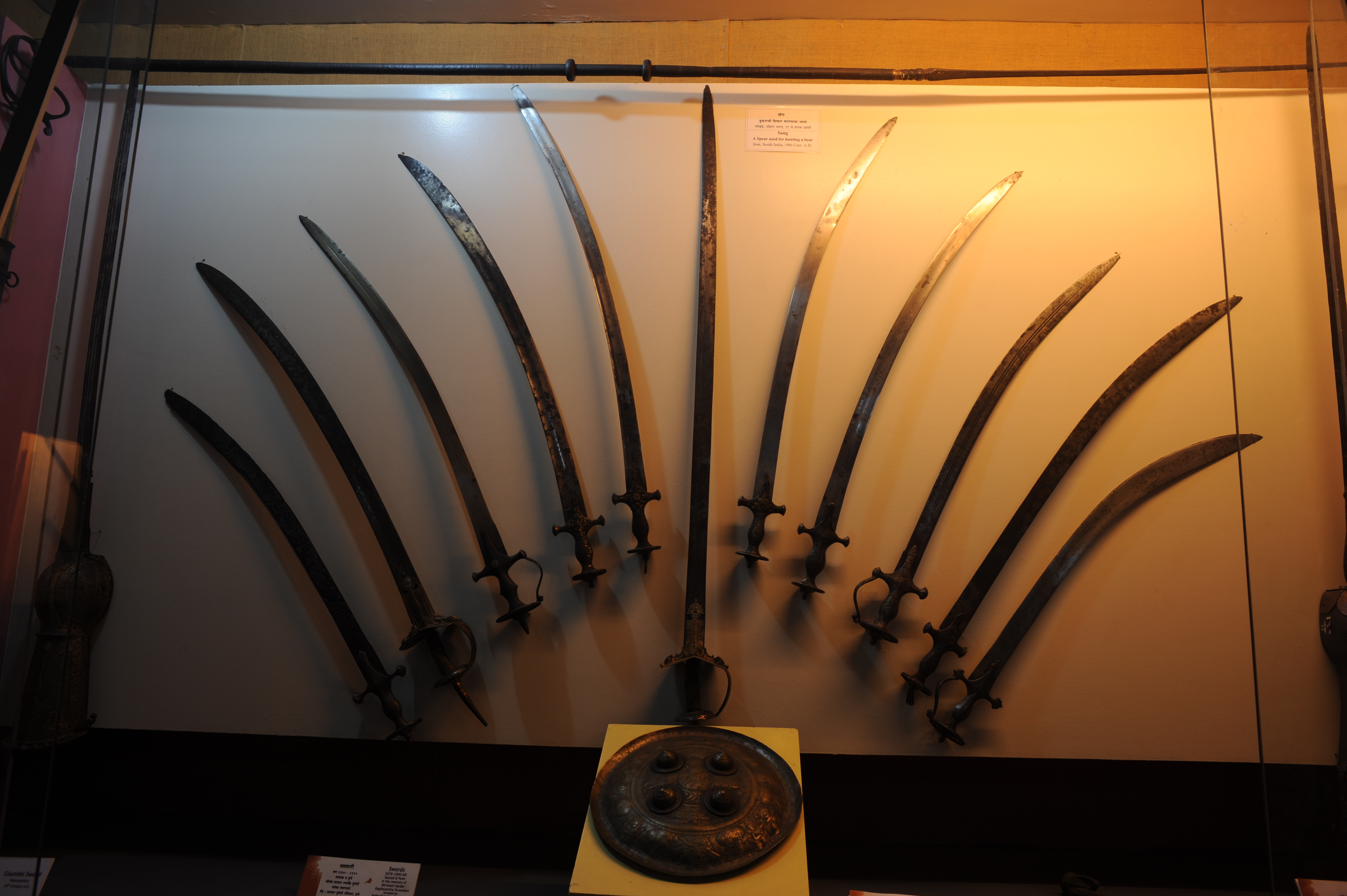
Arms & Armours

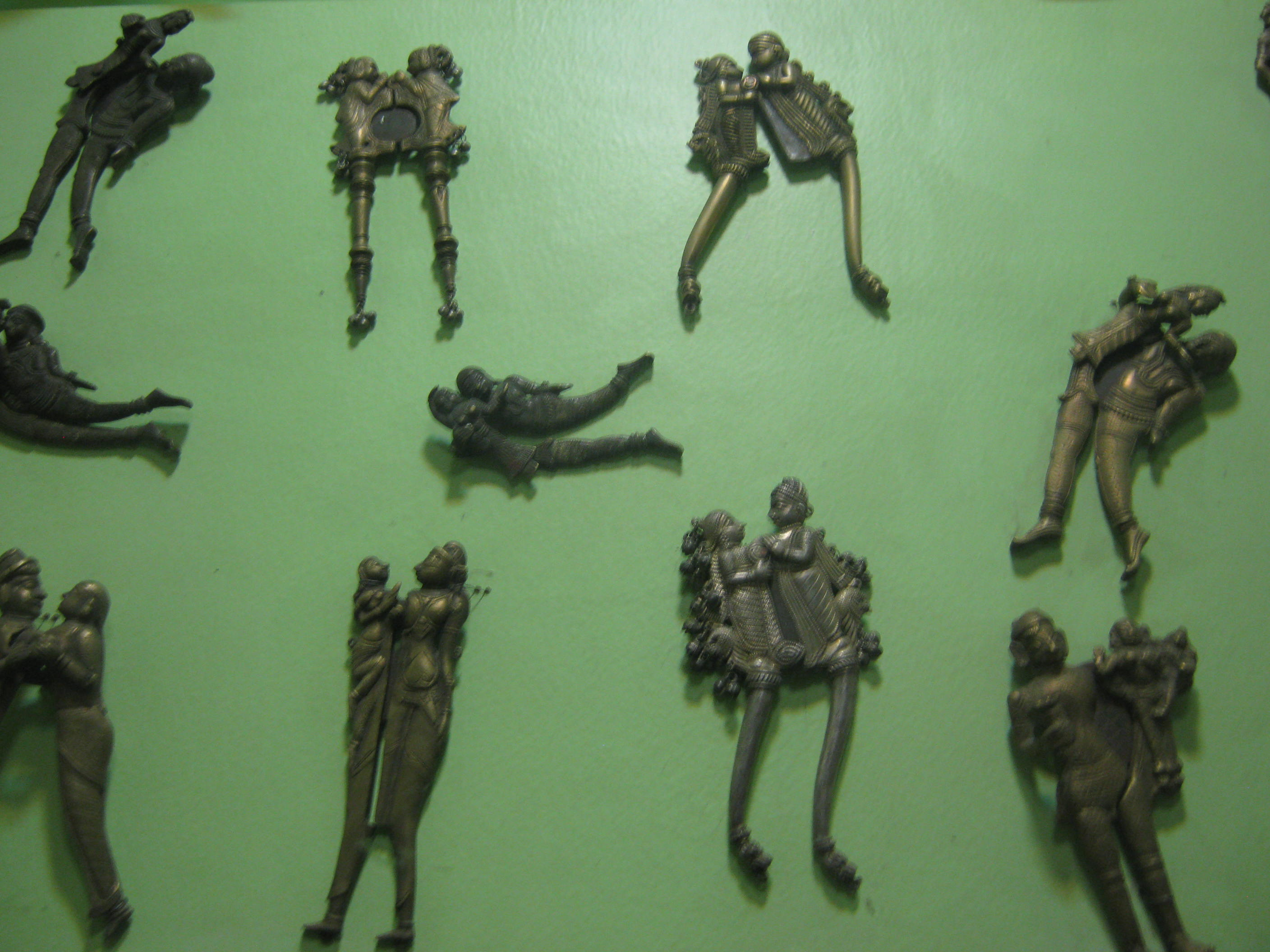
Betel nut crackers

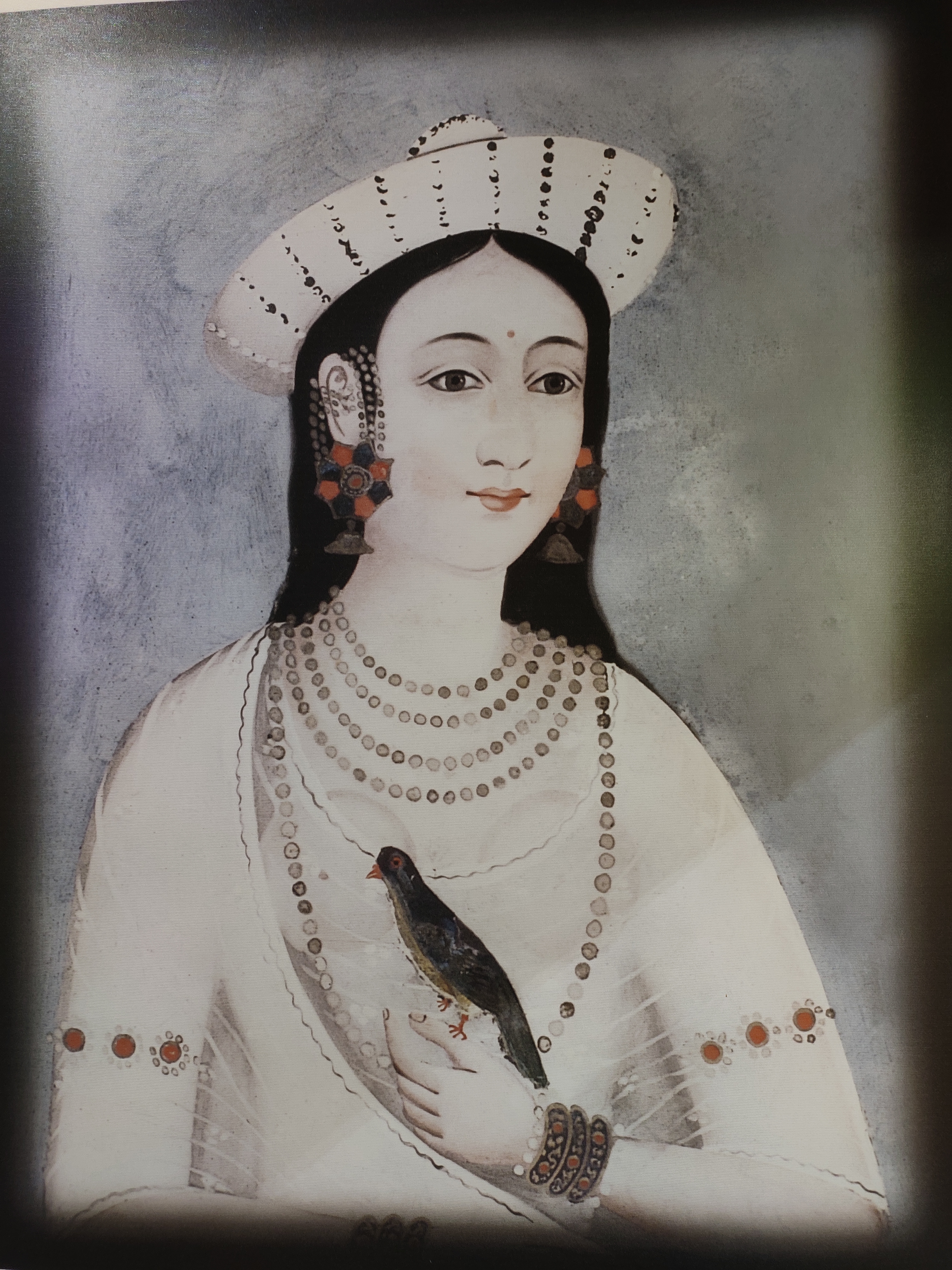
Mastani Peshwa

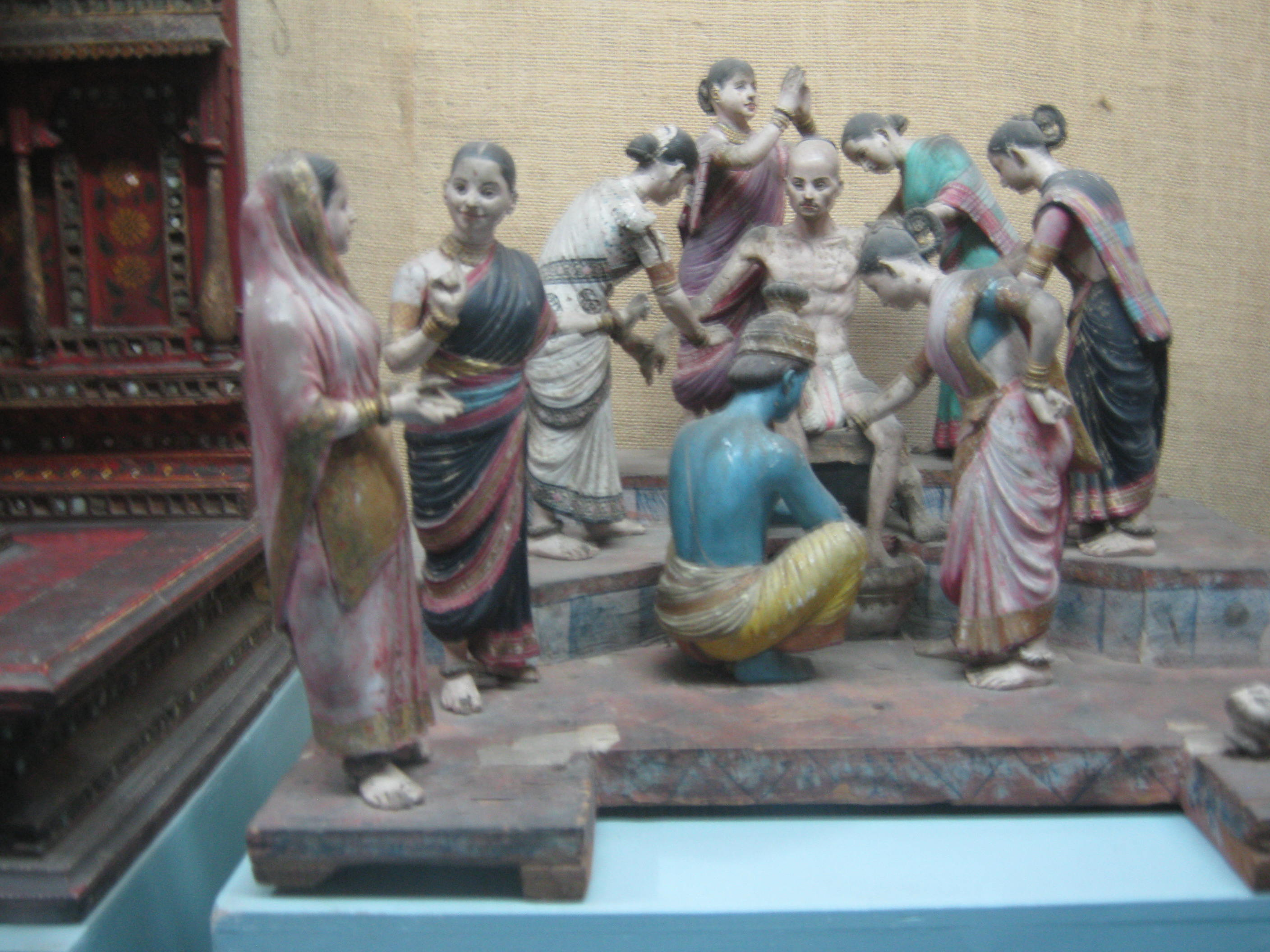
Lord Krishna and maids helping Sudama with his bath

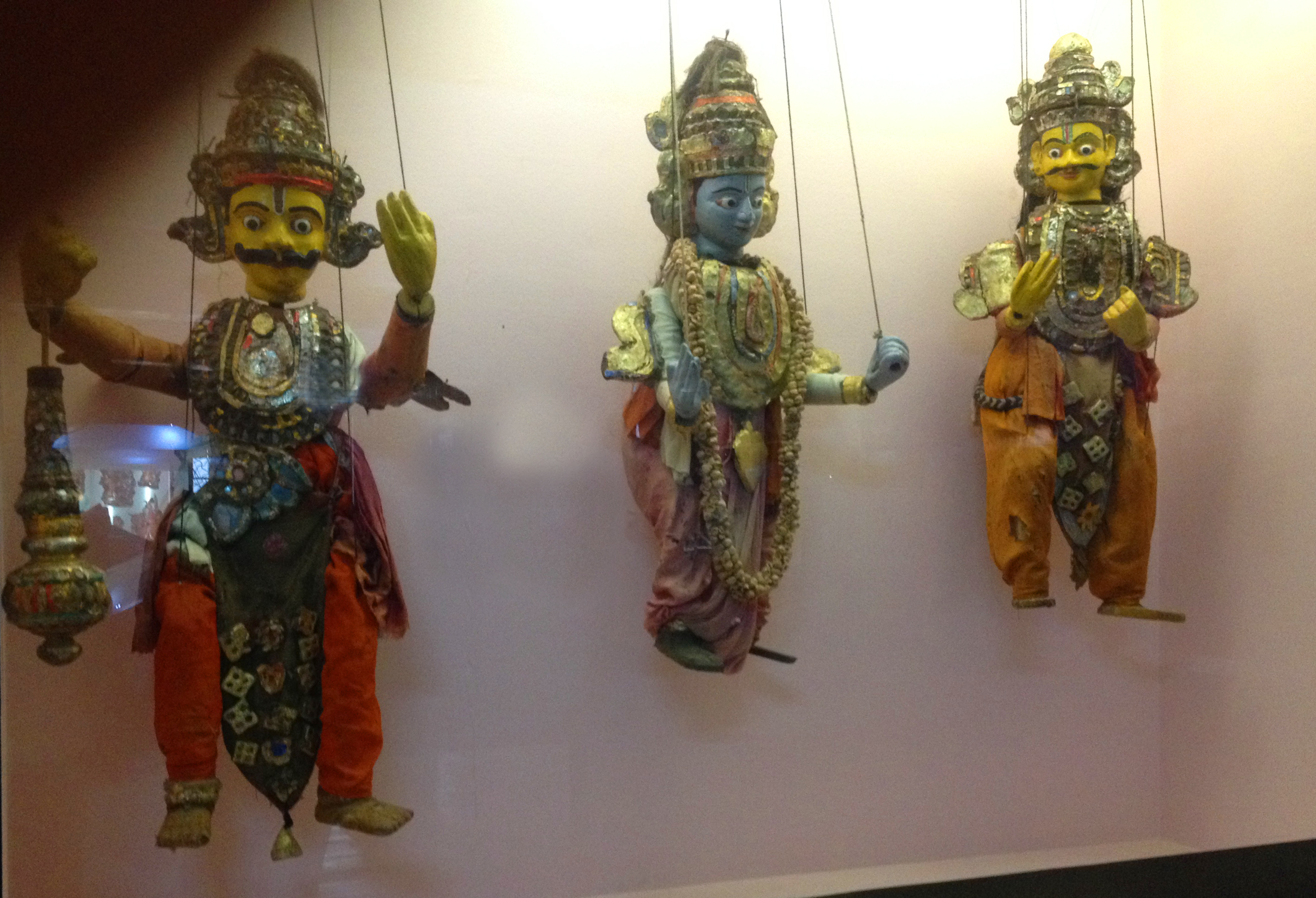
String puppets of Odisha

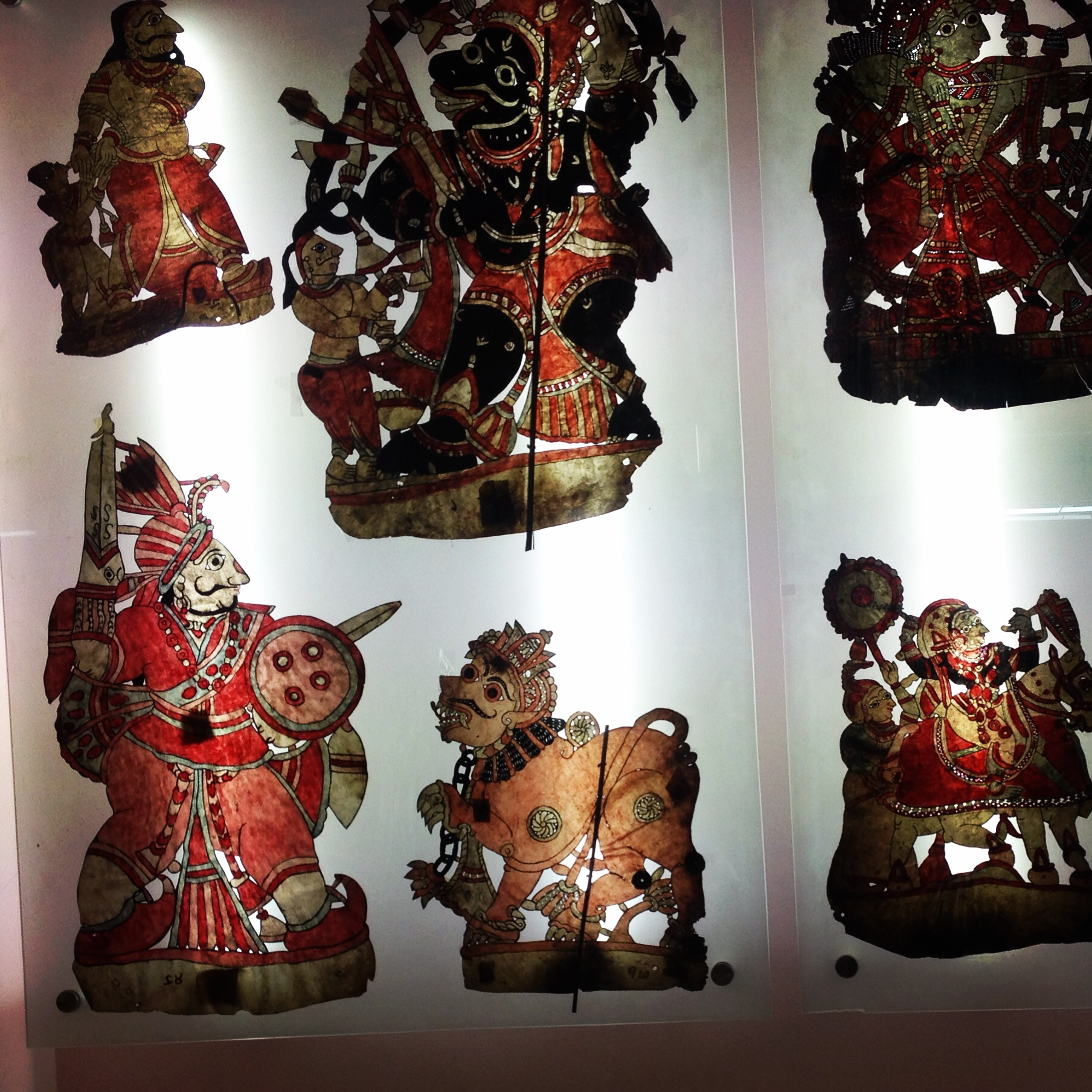
Shadow puppets of Karnataka

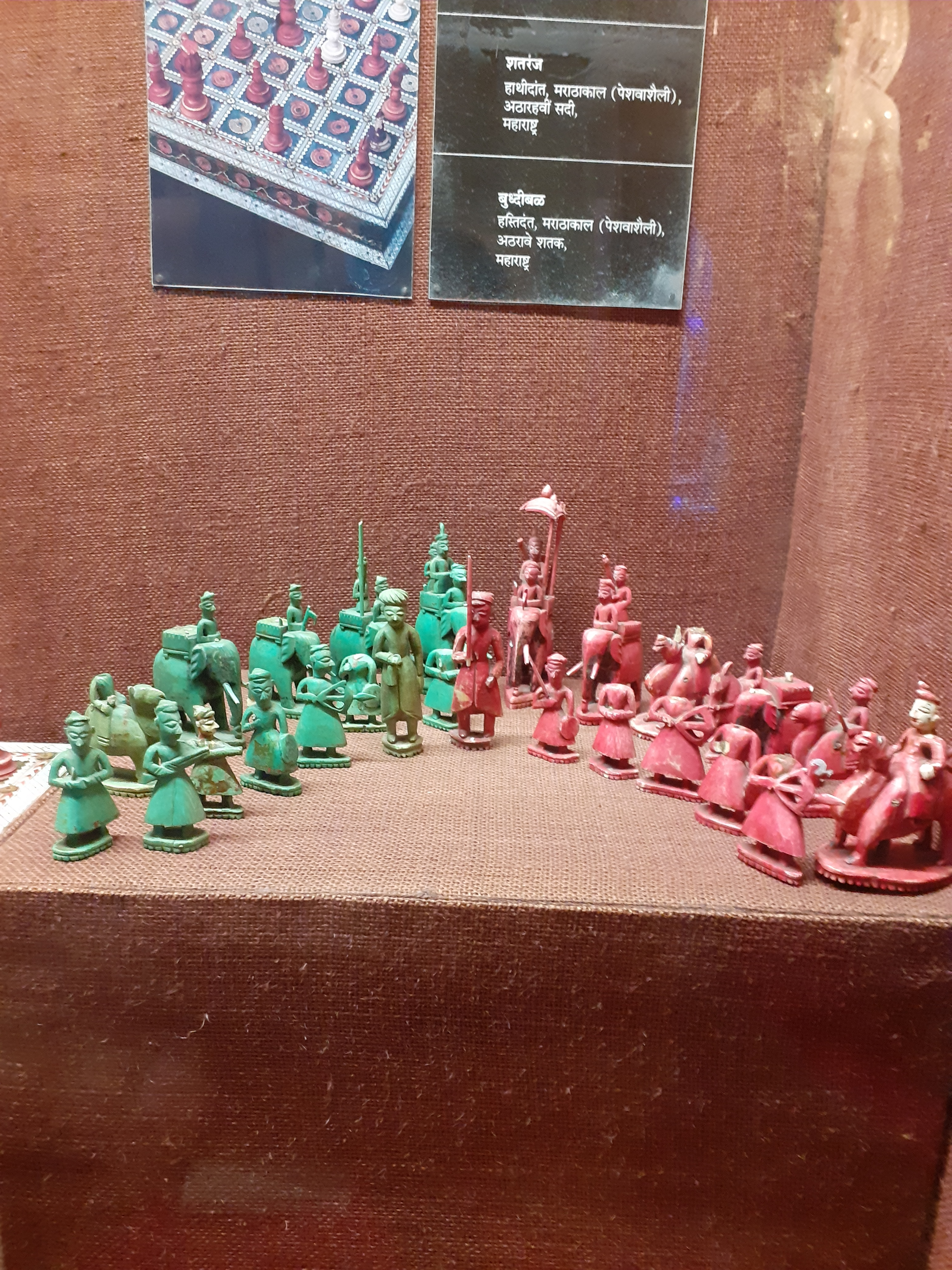
Pawns of Medieval Chess Board

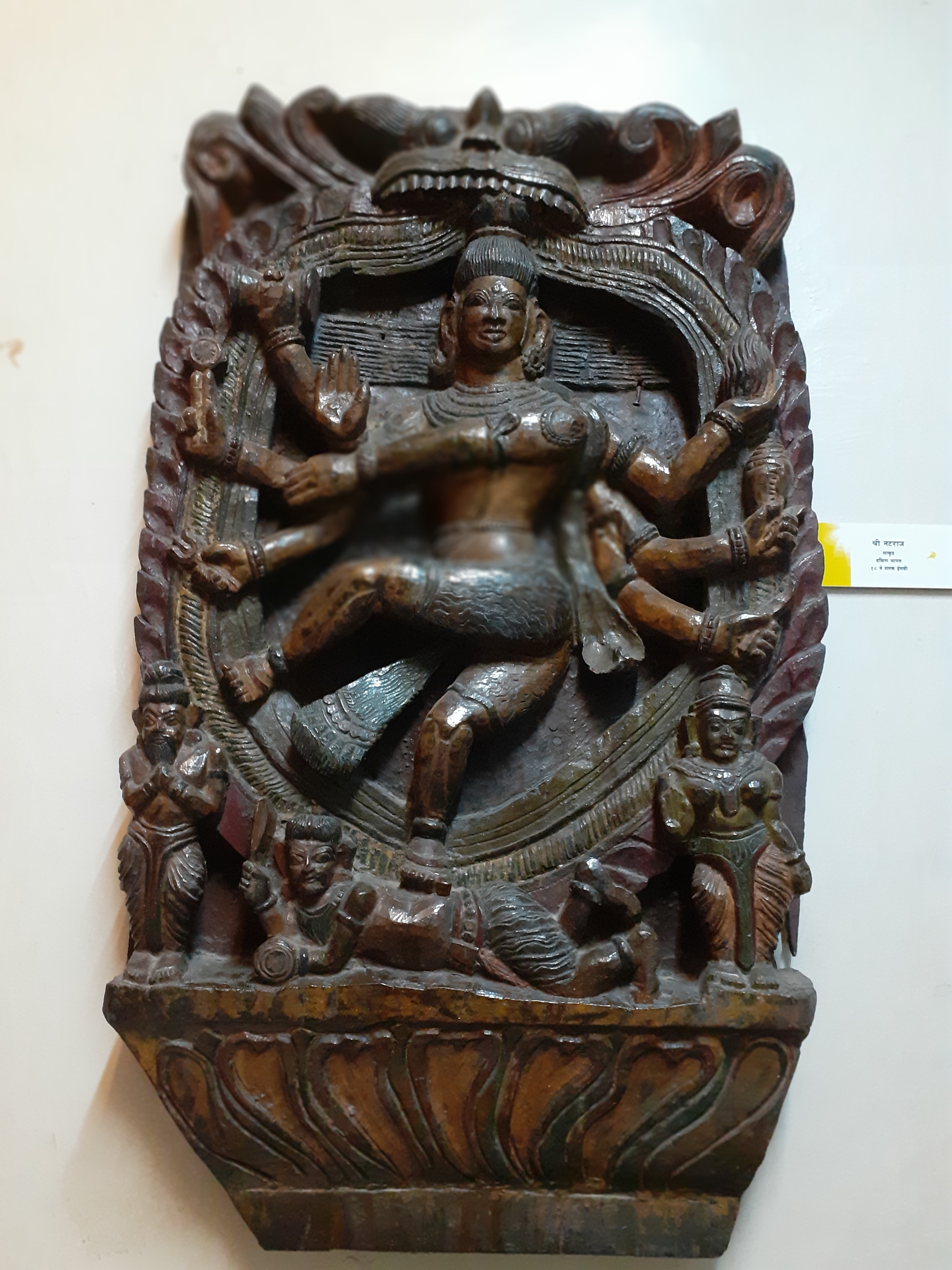
Wooden Sclepture of Shiv Tandav

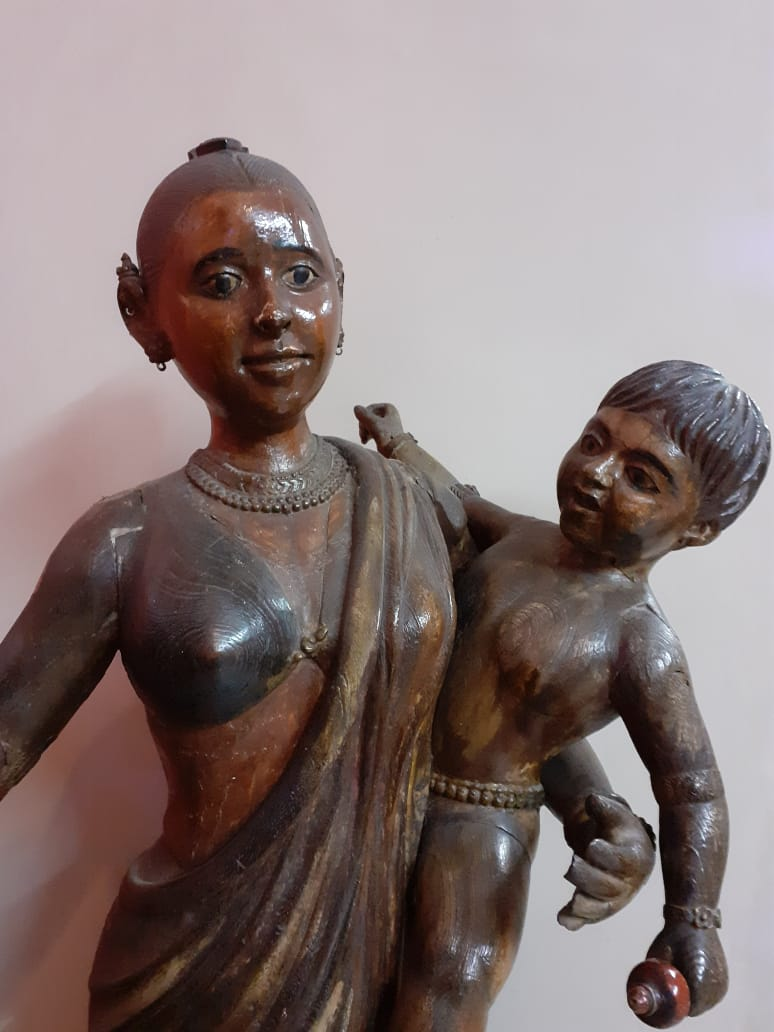
Wooden sculpture from the 18th century

== Chandrashekhar Agashe Museum Wing ==
This wing includes a collection of ancient Indian musical instruments belonging to the late industrialist Chandrashekhar Agashe donated by his sons, Panditrao Agashe and Dnyaneshwar Agashe. Taking his namesake, honoring the kinship of Chandrashekhar Agashe's widow and the founder of the museum, Dr. Dinkar G. Kelkar, with them being fourth cousins.

== See also ==
- List of museums in India
