= Bapat =

Bapat (Marathi: बापट) is a Marathi Chitpavan Brahmin surname.

Gotra: Vashishtha. Kulswamy: Shree Vyadeshwar (Guhagar, Maharashtra). Kulswamini: Yogeshwari (Ambejogai, Maharashtra).

Origin: Chiplun, Dhaulvalli, Ganapati Pule and Ratnagiri.

- Girish Bapat (born 1963), Indian politician
- Priya Bapat (born 1986), Indian actress
- Ravindra Bapat (born 1954), Indian statistician
- Senapati Bapat (1880–1967), Indian revolutionary
- Ulhas Bapat (born 1950), Indian musician
- Vasant Bapat (1922–2002), Indian poet
- Vishnu Vaman Bapat (1871–1927), Indian philosopher
