= Chandrashekhar Agashe College of Physical Education =

Sports college in Pune

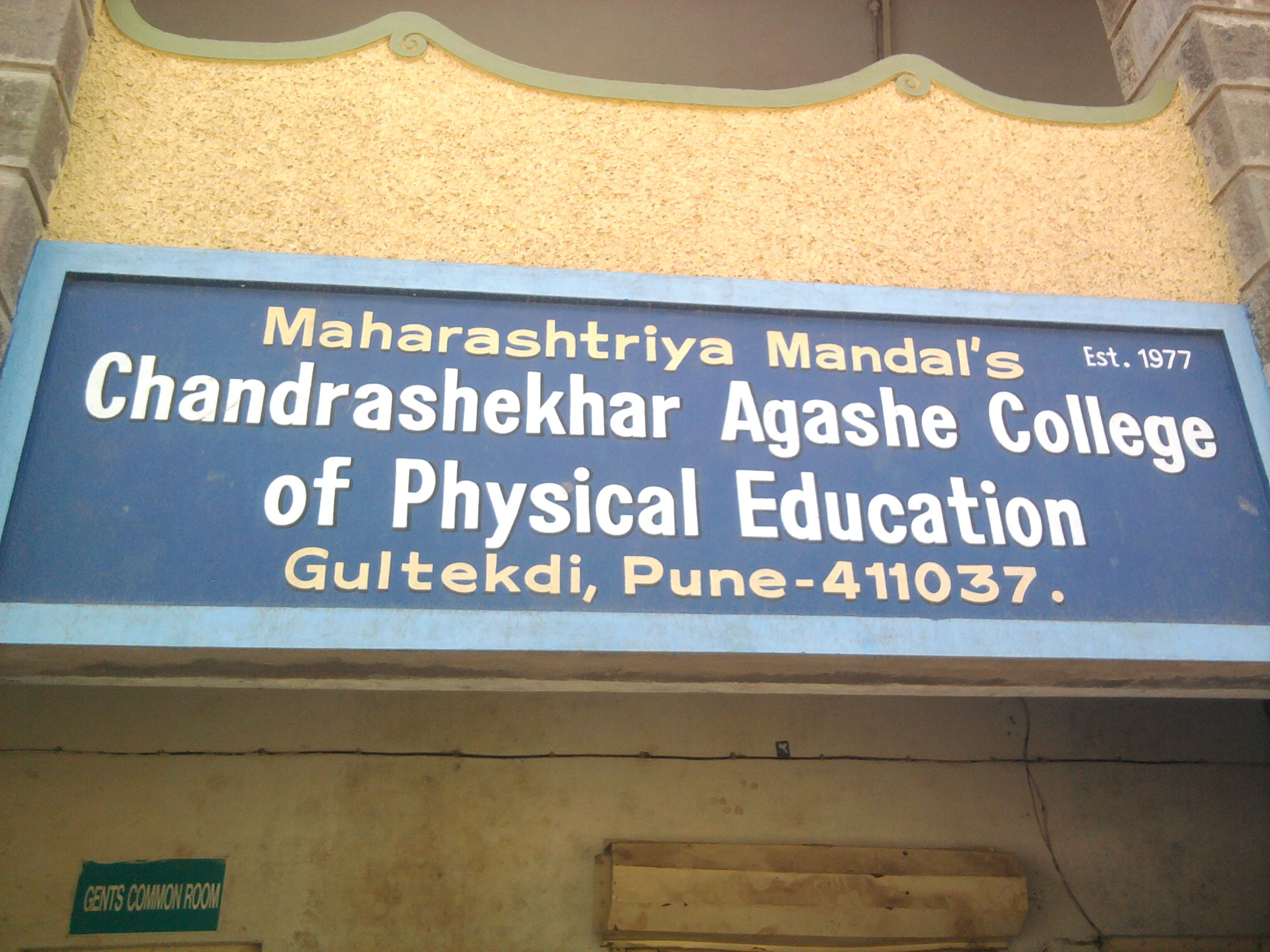
- Type: Autonomous research college
- Established: 1977; 49 years ago
- Founder: Shivrampant Damle
- Location: Pune, Maharashtra, India
- Campus: Urban
- Website: agashecollege.org

Chandrashekhar Agashe College of Physical Education (CACPE) is an Indian autonomous research college based in Gultekdi, Pune, Maharashtra, India. The university specializes in sports and physical education. It was founded on 1 July 1977, by Shivrampant Damle, who began work for its founding in 1938. It was named after Chandrashekhar Agashe. The university is affiliated to the Savitribai Phule Pune University.
