= Atmaram Raoji Bhat =

Indian journalist

- Born: 12 May 1905; Ratnagiri, Maharashtra, India
- Died: 18 January 1983 (aged 77); Pune, Maharashtra, India
- Occupations: Economic Adviser, Social worker, freedom fighter
- Spouse: Sumati (Kamal)
- Awards: Padma Shri; Laghu Udyog Ratna

Atmaram Raoji Bhat (1905-1983) was an Indian social worker, journalist and writer. He was the founder of Mahratta Chamber of Commerce, Industries and Agriculture which was established in 1934 and one of the founders of the Pune Divisional Productivity Council. A winner of the Laghu Udyog Ratna from the National alliance of Young Entrepreneur, he was honoured by the Government of India in 1971 with Padma Shri, the fourth highest Indian civilian award.

== Life ==
Born on 12 May 1905 in Ratnagiri in the Indian state of Maharashtra to a middle-class family, Bhat secured a master's degree in Commerce in 1929 and got involved in the freedom struggle, suffering incarceration. He worked for promoting small scale industry sector, founded the Mahratta Chamber of Commerce Industry and Agriculture in 1934 contributed to the establishment of the Bank of Maharashtra. After the Indian independence, he continued his work and was instrumental in the formation of the Pune Divisional Productivity Council in 1959. His efforts were also reported in the institution of the G. S. Parkhe Industrial Merit Prize, an annual award for the industrialists. He was the founder president of the Indian Languages Newspaper Association from its inception in 1941 till 1976 and the founder president of the Federation of Associations of Small Scale Industries of India. It was during his tenure, the association brought out the 1299 page All India Directory and Handbook of Small Industries. He was the author or editor of several publications and his life and work have been recorded in a biography written by S. J. Joshi under the name, Ātmārāma Rāvajī Bhaṭa : vyaktī āṇi kārya.
