= Shankar Vaman Dandekar =

Indian philosopher (1895–1968)

Shankar Vaman Dandekar (1895–1968), also known as Sonopant Dandekar, was a philosopher and educationist from Maharashtra, India.

Dandekar was an important interpreter of Warkari Bhakti Sampraday in Maharashtra. He served as a professor of philosophy and the principal of Sir Parashurambhau College in Pune for many years.

He edited and published several Hindu religious texts in Sanskrit and Marathi languages.
