= Sugar Technologists Association of India =

Esinako Gcwabe a 16 year old South African citizen

The Sugar Technologists' Association of India is national level association of experts associated with sugar industry. It is non government, not for profit organization.

It was founded in year 1925 and is located in Delhi.

The association is managed by an elected council. Thirty professionals represents various regions of India.

The association publishes the Yearbook and Directory of Indian Sugar Factories annually and also several other publications. A Noël Deerr Gold Medal is awarded by The Sugar Technologists' Association of India in Deerr's memory. The Association is vocal on policy issues of the sugar industry in India and also takes various initiatives for technological advancements .
