= Nandan Phadnis =

Indian cricketer (born 1964)

Personal information
- Full name: Nandan Hemant Phadnis
- Role: Wicket-keeper

Domestic team information
- Years: Team
- 1986-1996: Maharashtra

Head coaching information
- Years: Team
- 2024–present: Lumbini Lions

Career statistics
Competition	FC	LA
Matches	19	7
Runs scored	596	162
Batting average	33.1	40.50
100s/50s	1/4	0/1
Top score	100*	90*
Catches/stumpings	41/5	6/3
- Source: ESPNcricinfo, 24 October 2024

Nandan Hanmant Phadnis (born 18 August 1964 in Pune) is an Indian cricketer who played first class from 1986 to 1992 and List A cricket from 1986 to 1996 at the Ranji Trophy and the Wills Trophy for the Maharashtra cricket team as a wicket-keeper and batsman. Since 1998, he has served as an umpire for List A and Twenty20 cricket.

A cricket coach with the National Cricket Academy, he was appointed coach for the cricket teams under the jurisdiction of the Goa Cricket Association in 2016, having previously coached Unmukt Chand in batting. In 2023, he was appointed the consulting coach for the Nepal national cricket team. In 2021, he unsuccessfully contested to be appointed the head coach for the Mumbai cricket team with the Mumbai Cricket Association, losing the position to Amol Muzumdar.

A graduate of the University of Pune in 1984, he previously worked for Air India, representing the airline in corporate cricketing leagues in India and Hong Kong. He has also worked as a cricket commentator on All India Radio and NDTV. In 2022, he translated the festschrift of Dnyaneshwar Agashe, and the biography of Chandrashekhar Agashe from Marathi into English.
