= Vishnu Vaman Bapat =

Marathi writer

- Born: 22-May-1871
- Died: Unknown
- Known for: Indian Philosophy

Vishnu Vaman Bapat (1871–??) was an Indian philosopher, famous for his commentary in Marathi on ancient Sanskrit texts.

His works include

- Commentary on Adi Shankara's Brahmasutra
- Bauddhadharanisar
- Sankhayttwakoomudisar
