= Mahratta Chamber of Commerce, Industries and Agriculture =

Business advocacy group in Pune, Maharashtra, India

The Maratha Chamber of Commerce Industries and Agriculture (MCCIA) is an Indian business advocacy and networking group located in Pune, serving businesses in the state of Maharashtra. It was established in 1934 by Atmaram Raoji Bhat, and is one of the few trade associations that came into existence before the Indian independence movement. In 2011, the chamber proposed plans to renovate the embankments of the Mula-Mutha River. Dr Sudhir Mehta, the chairman and managing director of Indian vehicle interior manufacturer, Pinnacle Industries, was appointed president of MCCIA in September 2020. His term is due to run until 2022.
