= Shaniwar Peth =

Peth is a general term in the Marathi language for a locality in the Indian cities. These include cities like Pune, Solapur, Madhavnagar, Karad, and Ahmednagar. The term Shaniwar has derived from the day Saturday in Marathi.
