= Shaniwar Peth, Pune =

Shaniwar Peth
- Locality in Pune City
- Location in Maharashtra, India
- Coordinates: 18°31′15.15″N 73°51′5.43″E
- Country: India
- State: Maharashtra
- District: Pune
- Named for: Saturday

Languages
  - Official: Marathi
- Time zone: UTC+5:30 (IST)
- Postal code: 411030

Shaniwar Peth is a historic ward in the centre of the Indian city of Pune. Shaniwar means Saturday in Marathi and other Indian languages.

Under the Muslim rule this place was known as Murujabad/Murtuzabad.

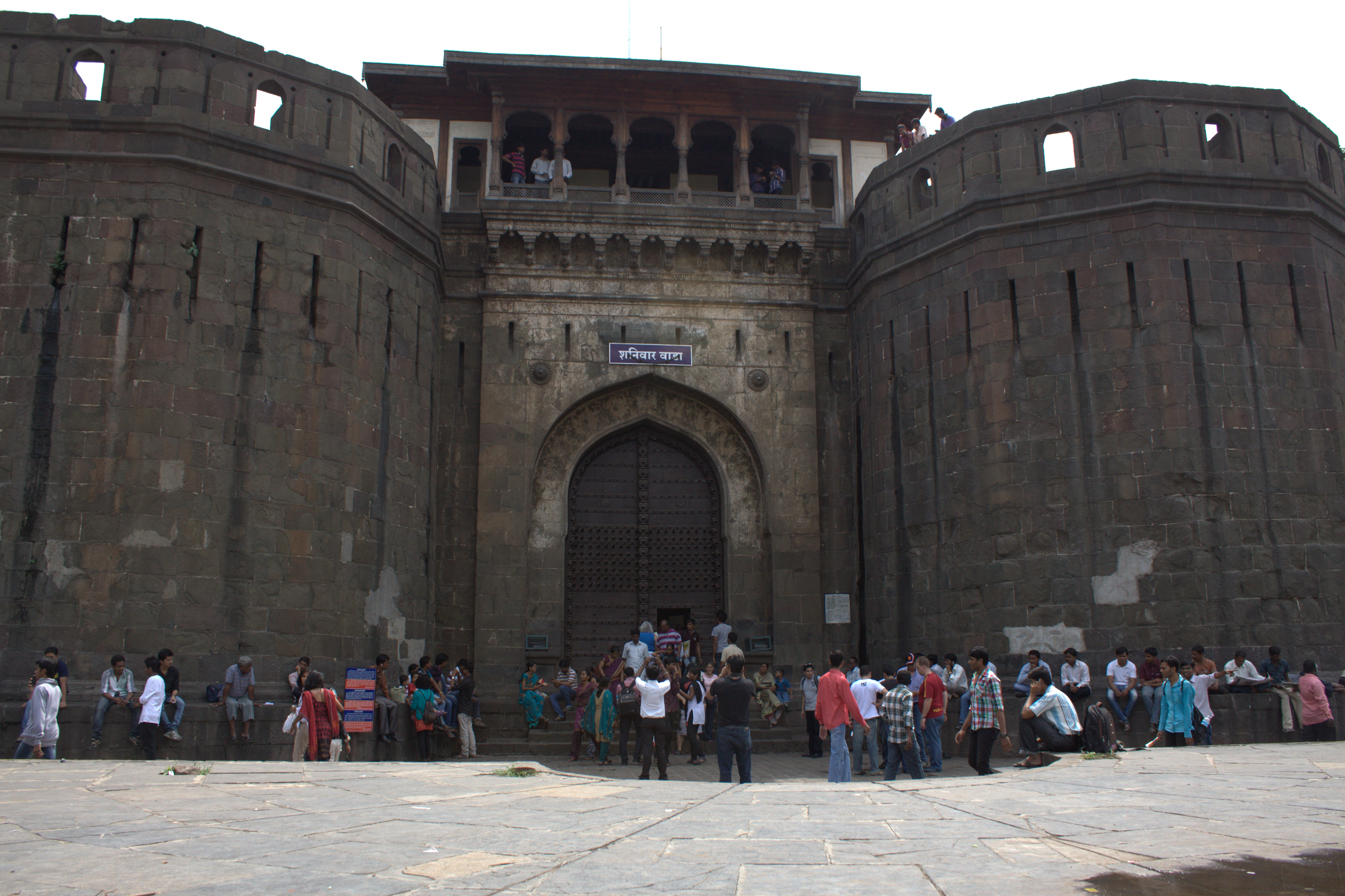
Shaniwar Wada, the palace and administrative headquarters built by Baji Rao I in 1730

== History ==
The area has ruins of Jain temples and ghats dating back to Yadava period. Shaniwar peth also has two Muslim tombs, the Shaikh salah on the bank of the Mutha River. These were built on the ruins of hindu temples of Kedareshwar and Amriteshwar in the 13th century. The systematic development of the area started under the Nizamshahi of Ahmadnagar. The area was named Murtazabad after the sultan ruling at that time.

In 1728, the Peshwa ruler, Bajirao I moved his administration from nearby Saswad to Pune, and in the process, laid the foundation for turning Pune into a large city. Before Bajirao I made Pune his headquarters, the town already had six "Peths" or wards, namely, Kasba, Shaniwar, Raviwar, Somwar, Mangalwar, and Budhwar. Bajirao also started construction of a palace called Shaniwar Wada on the eastern bank of the Mutha River and at the northern end of shaniwar peth. The construction was completed in 1730, ushering in the era of Peshwa control over the city. Many senior officials of the Maratha empire built their own residence in Shaniwar Peth close to Shanwar Wada.

== Businesses and Amenities ==
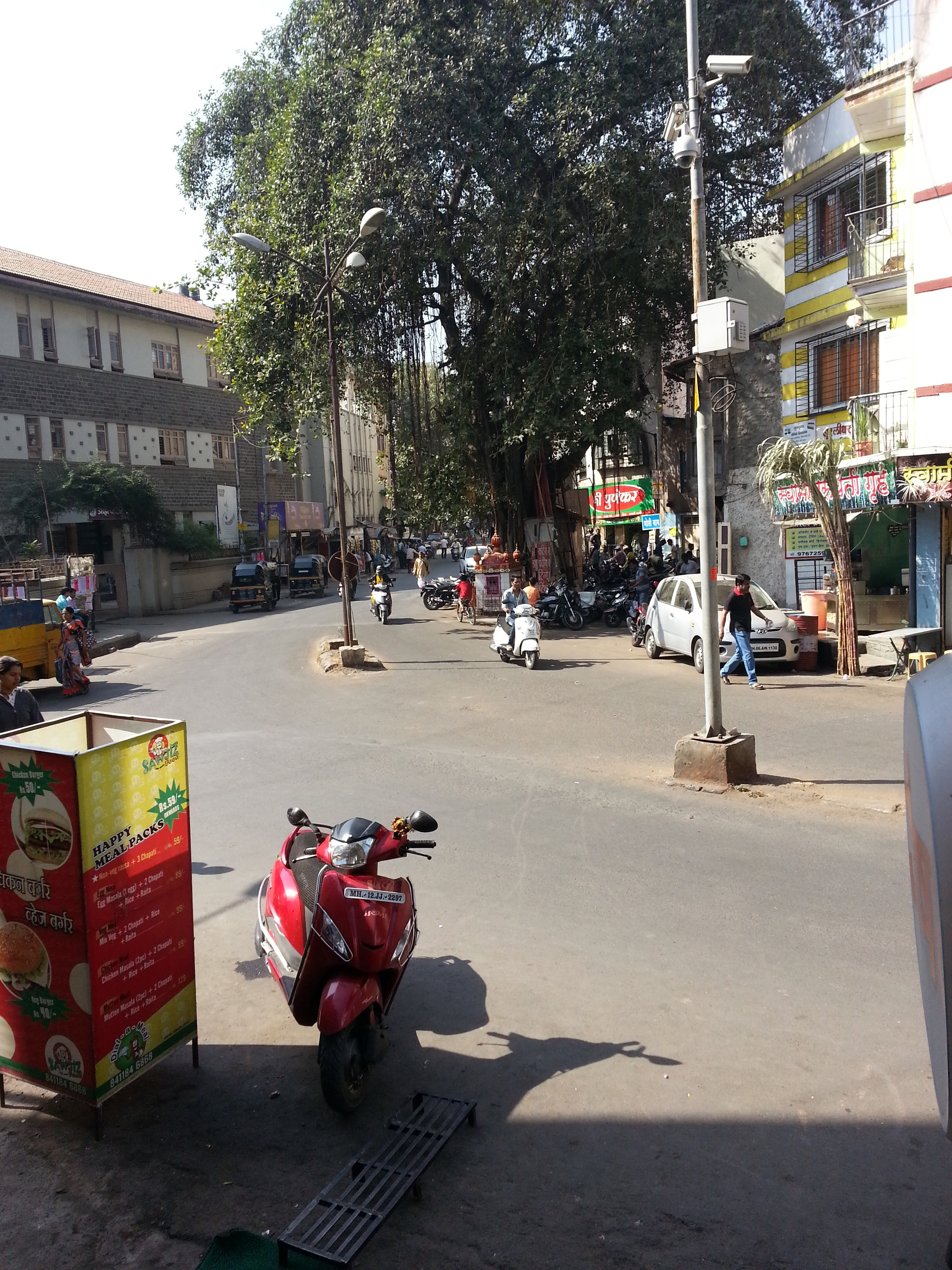
Ahilyadevi Girls High school in Shaniwar peth

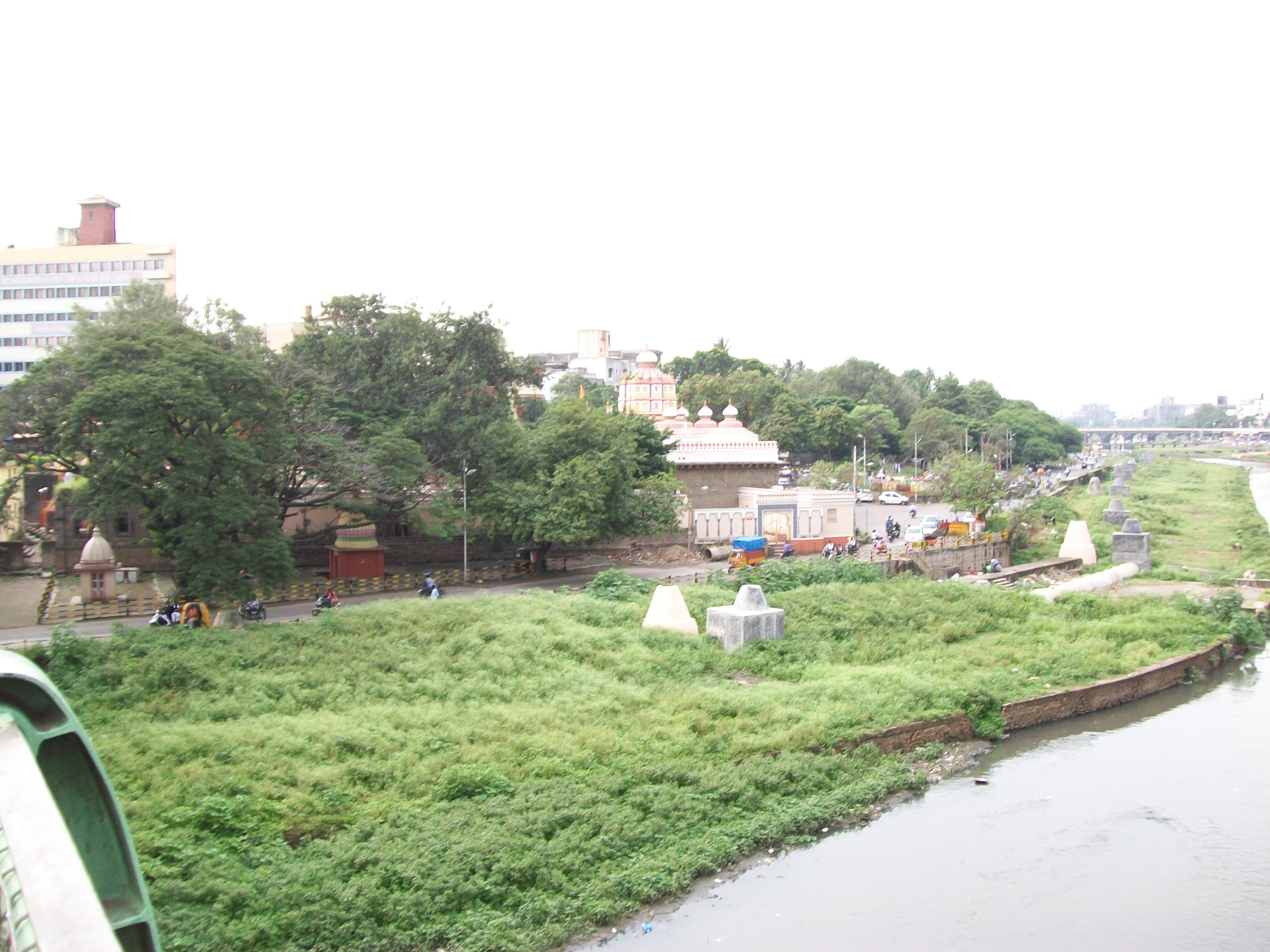
Omkareshwar temple in Shaniwar peth on the banks of the Mutha River

Shaniwar is primarily a residential locality but has pockets of commercial activities. The area has many businesses involved in printing and publishing. The services offered include Offset printing, Paper cutting, paper & cardboard wholesale, and retail sales. Appa Balwant Chowk, the cross roads which has been the go to place for books for many decades in the city is partly in Shaniwar peth.

=== Schools ===
Shaniwar Peth has many Marathi language schools.

- Ranade Balak Mandir
- Navin Marathi Shala
- New English School, Ramanbag (adjacent; in Narayan Peth)
- SNDT Kanya Shala (adjacent; in Narayan Peth. Playground of the school in Shaniwar Peth)
- Ahilyadevi High school

=== Hindu Temples ===
The peth has many old temples dedicated to different Hindu deities. The historic ones include Omkareshwar temple dedicated to Shiva, Dakshin-mukhi Maruti to Hanuman, and Gupchup Ganpati to Ganesh. The ghat on Mutha river, at Omkareshwar used to serve as Hindu cremation ground until 1971.
