= Rohida fort =

Fort in Maharashtra, India

Rohida Fort
- Pune district, Maharashtra
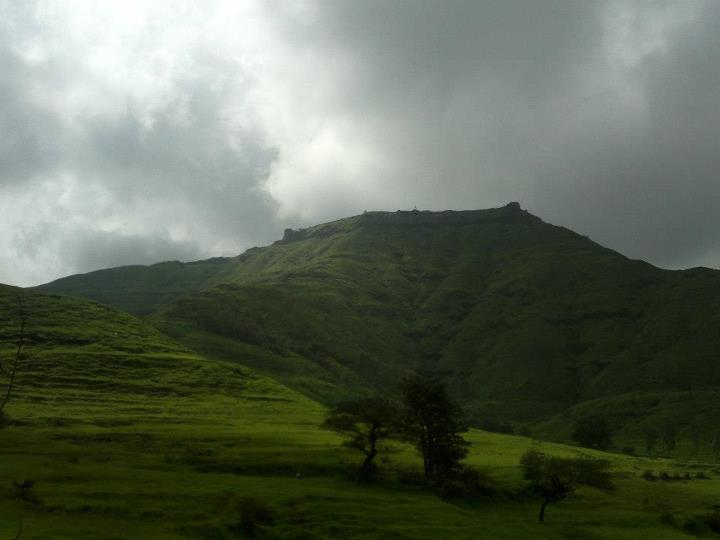
- Rohida fort

Site information
- Type: Hill fort
- Owner: Government of India
- Open to the public: Yes
- Condition: Ruins

Location
- Shown within Maharashtra
- Location within Maharashtra
- Coordinates: 18°06′10″N 73°49′15″E

Site history
- Materials: Stone

Rohida fort / Vichitragad Fort is a fort located 10 km from Bhor, Pune district, of Maharashtra. This fort is an important fort in Pune district. The fort restoration is done by the Shree Shivdurga Samvardhan committee with the help of forest dept. and local villagers.

== History ==
This fort was built during Yadava period. According to the inscription on the third gate, Mohammed Adil Shah of Bijapur had repaired this fort in May 1656. Rohida was among the 23 forts Chatrapati Shivaji Maharaj handed over to Mughals (to Aurangzeb) as part the Treaty of Purandar(1665). On 24 June 1670, this fort was again captured by Shivaji Maharaj. The Jedhe and the Khopade families held the fiefdom of lands around the fort during Nizamshahi and later during Adilshahi. The fort was recaptured by the Mughals during the Maratha Mughal war.In the early 1700s, the fort came under the control of the Pant Sachivs, the ruling family of Bhor State.It remained part of bhor state until Indian independence in 1947. The Pant sachivs renamed the fort, Vicitragad.

== How to reach ==
The nearest town is Bhor which is 61 km from Pune. The base village of the fort is Bajarwadi which is 7 km from Bhor. There are good hotels at Bhor, now tea and snacks are also available in small hotels at Bajarwadi and Khanapur. The trekking path starts from the hillock west of the Bajarwadi Highschool. The route is very safe and wide. There are no trees on the trekking route. It takes about an hour to reach the entrance gate of the fort. The night stay on the fort can be made in the Rohidamalla temple on the fort. Bhairu bhiva Hawaldar rohida fort rakhwaldar. The villagers from the local fort restoration committee in the Bajarwadi make night stay and food arrangements at reasonable cost.

== Places to see ==
There are three gates on the main entrance path of the fort. The main entrance gate has a Ganesh patti and Miharab. There is a rock cut water cistern near the second gate. The water is available round the year for drinking purpose. There are idols of Lion and Sharabha on the second gate. After climbing 57 steps the third gate is reached. There are idols of heads of elephants on either side and rock cut inscripture in Persian and Marathi on the outer side of the gate. There is a temple of Rohidamalla in good condition on the fort. There are seven Bastions on the fort, they are Shirawale Buruj, Patane buruj, Damugade buruj, Waghjai Buruj, Sarja Buruj, Fatte Buruj and Sadar buruj. In some books presence of Shirja buruj is also mentioned, but its location is unknown. There is a series of rock-cut water cisterns on the southern side of the fort. It takes about an hour to visit all places on the fort.

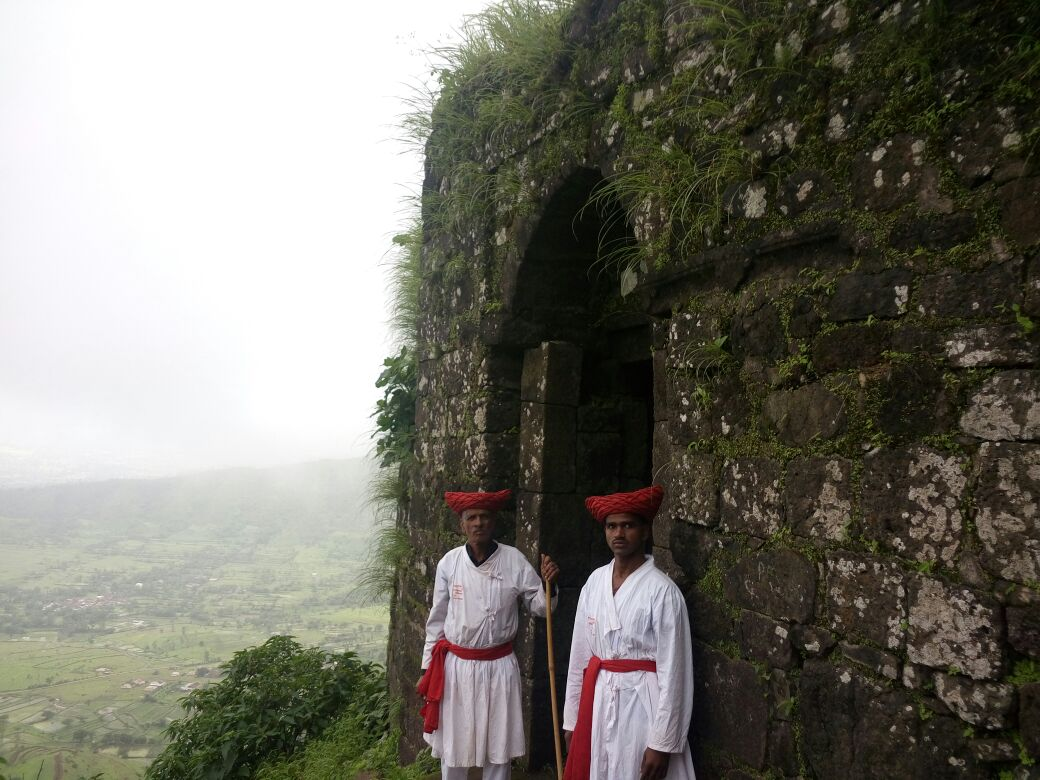
Main gate of Rohida Fort

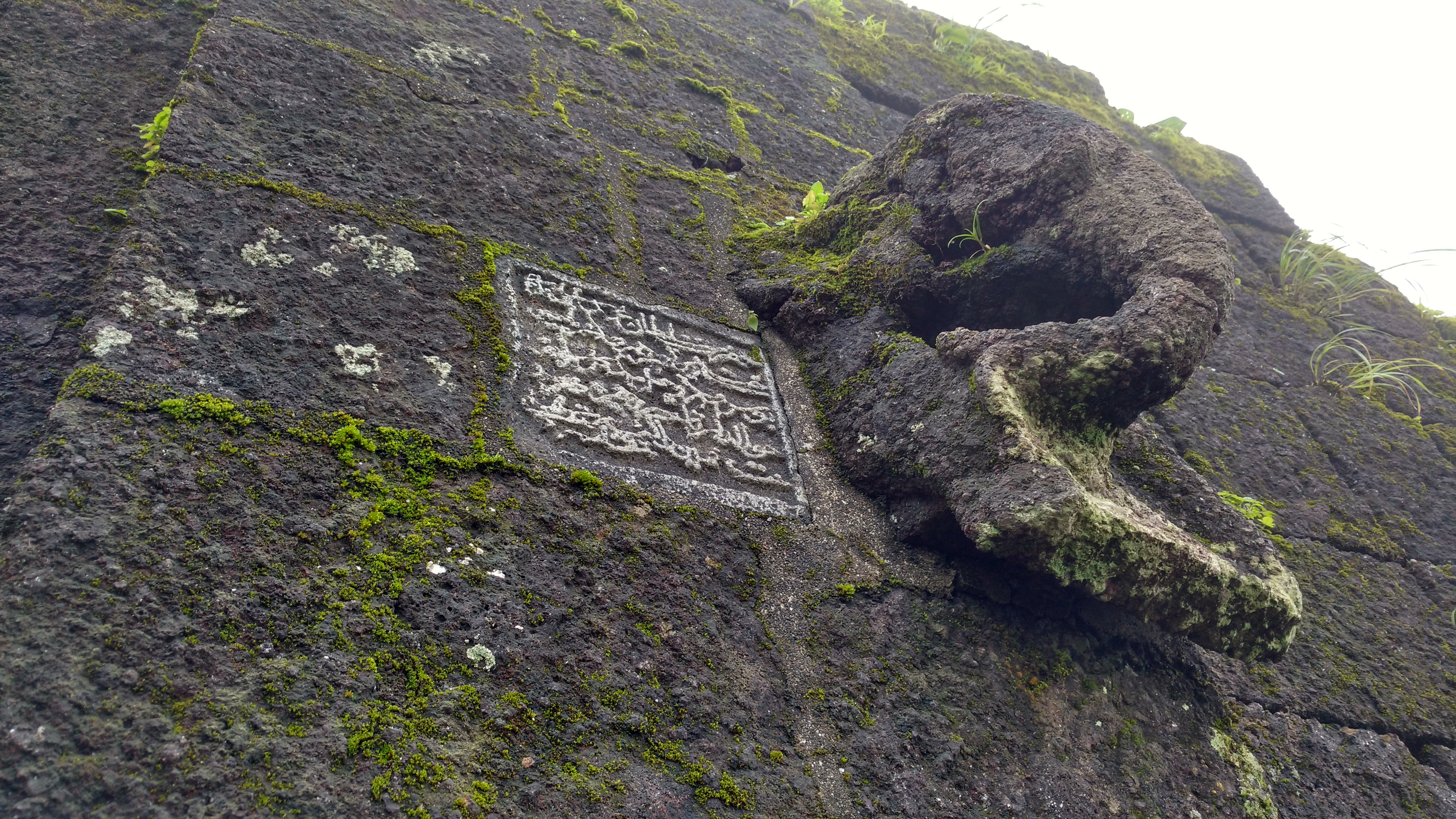
Inscription in Farasi

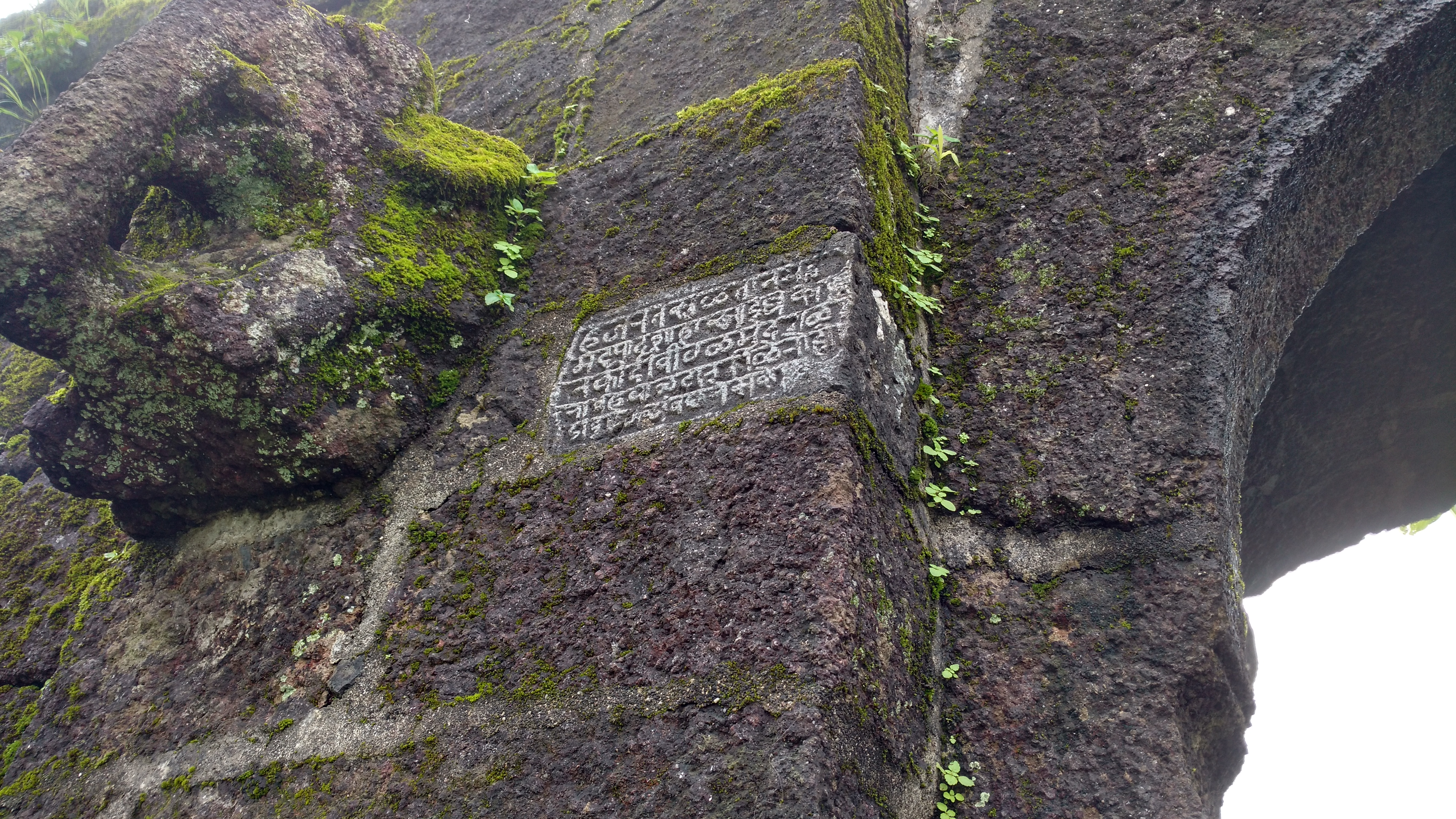
Inscription in Marathi

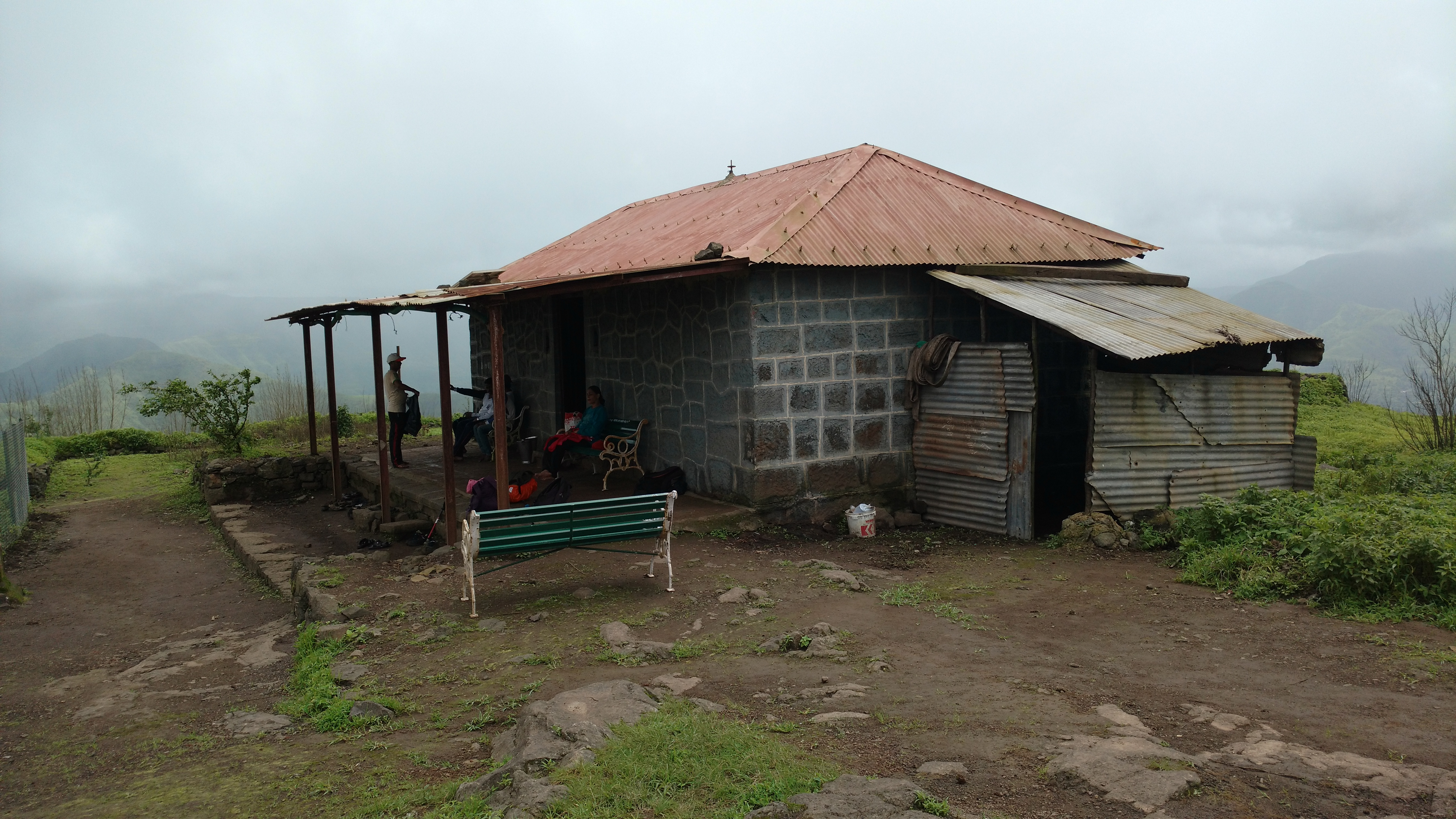
Rohidmalla temple

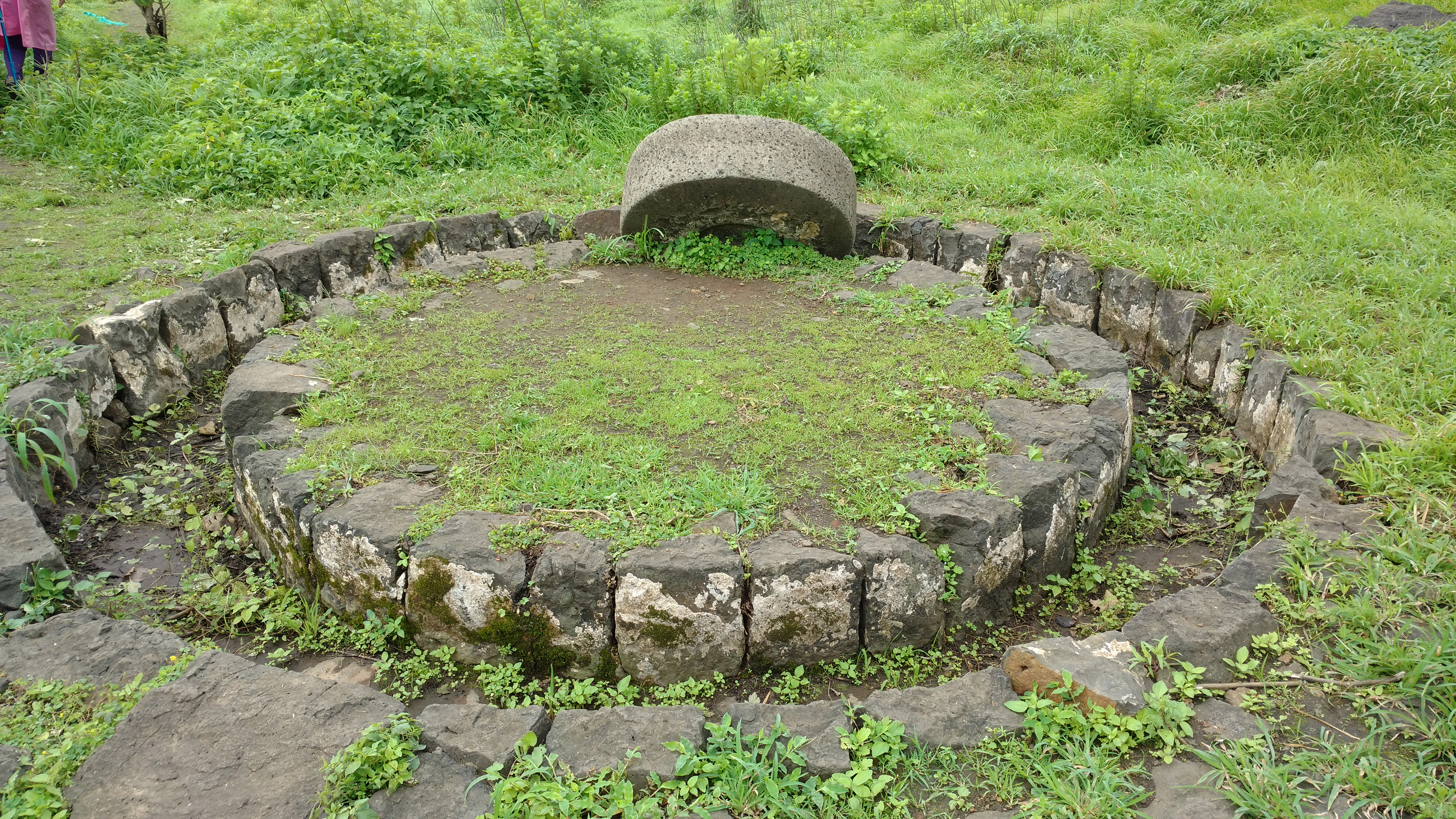
Limestone mixer

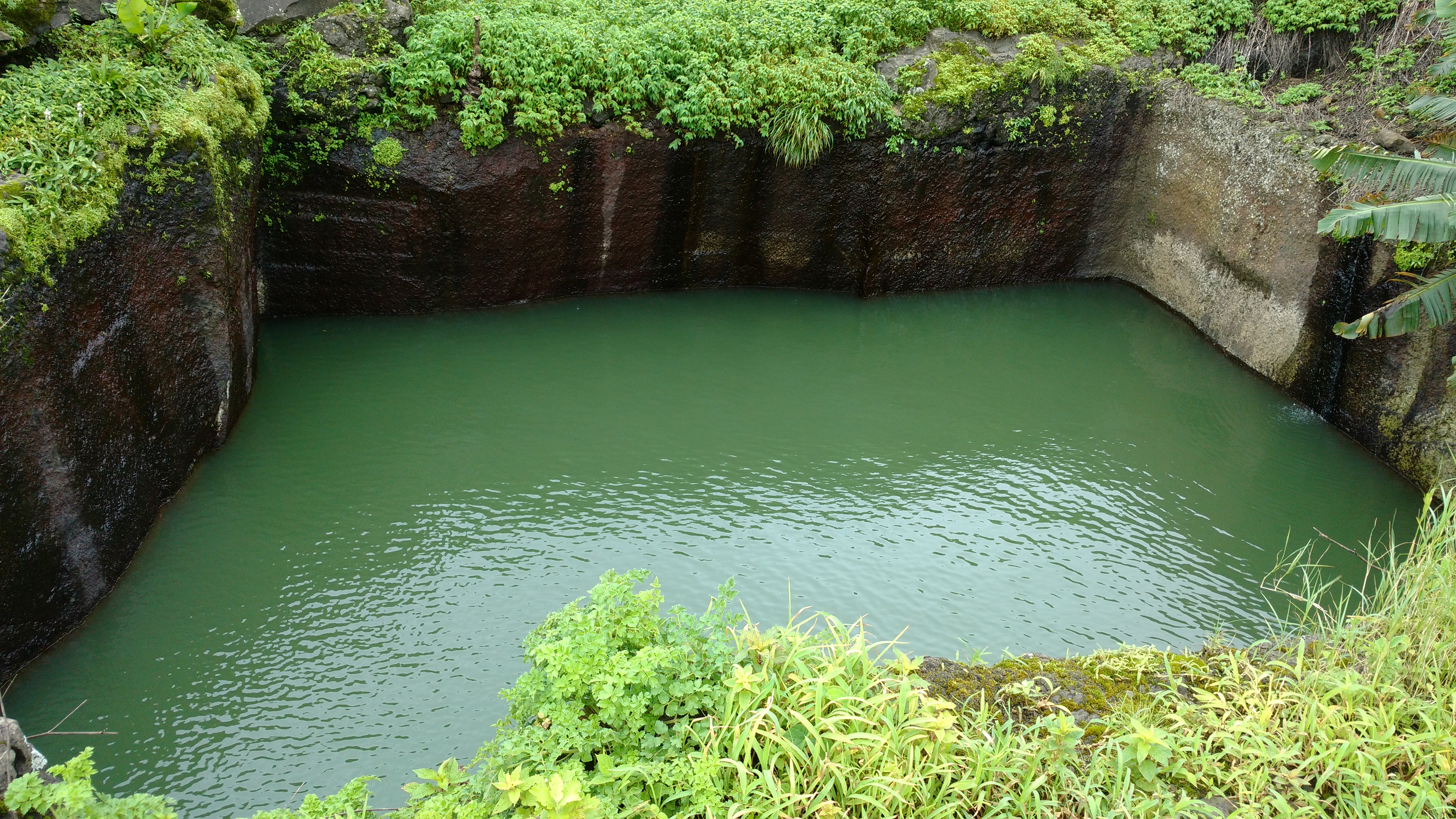
Rockcut water cistern

== See also ==
- List of forts in Maharashtra
- List of forts in India
- Baji Prabhu Deshpande
