= Raghunathrao Shankarrao Gandekar =

11th Raja of Bhor (1878–1951)

Raghunathrao Shankarrao Gandekar KCIE KGSJM KECM KGCM DD
- Meherban Shrimant Raja (ruler of Bhor), Madar-ul-Maham (Most faithful ruler)
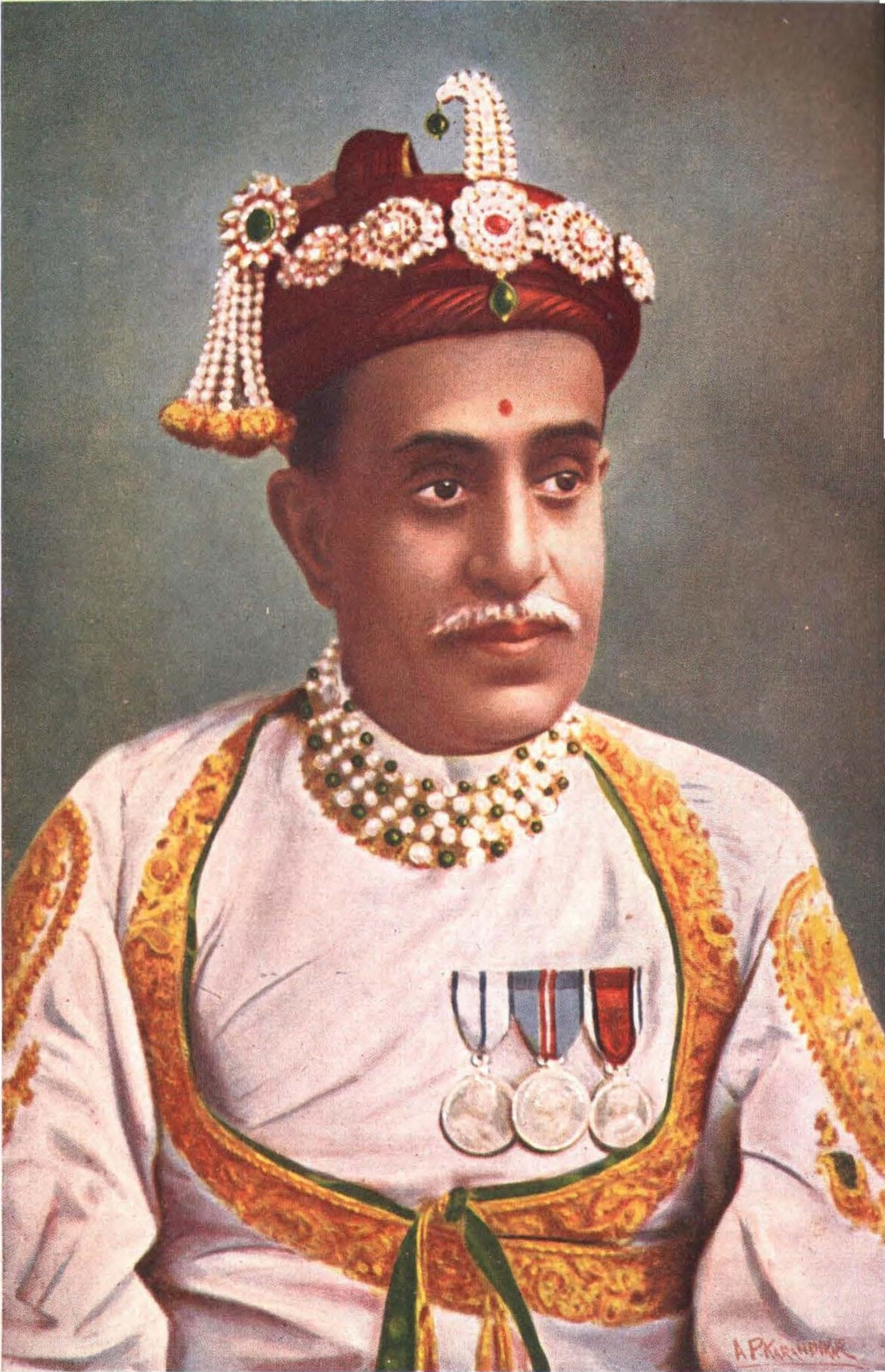

11th Raja of Bhor State
- Reign: 18 July 1922 – 8 March 1948
- Coronation: 18 July 1922, Bhor Rajwada
- Predecessor: Shankarrao Chimnajirao Gandekar (father)
- Successor: Sadashivrao Raghunathrao Gandekar (son)
- Born: 20 September 1878; Bhor, Bhor State, British India
- Died: 27 August 1951 (aged 72); Bhor Rajwada, Bhor, Bombay state, India
- Spouse: Gangutaisaheb (1 June 1893 – 1907); Laxmibai Ranisaheb
- Issue: Raja Shrimant Sadashivrao Ragunathrao; Anandrao Raghunathrao; Narayanrao Raghunathrao; Vijayadevi
- House: Gandekar
- Father: Shankarrao Chimnajirao Gandekar
- Mother: Jijibai
- Religion: Hinduism

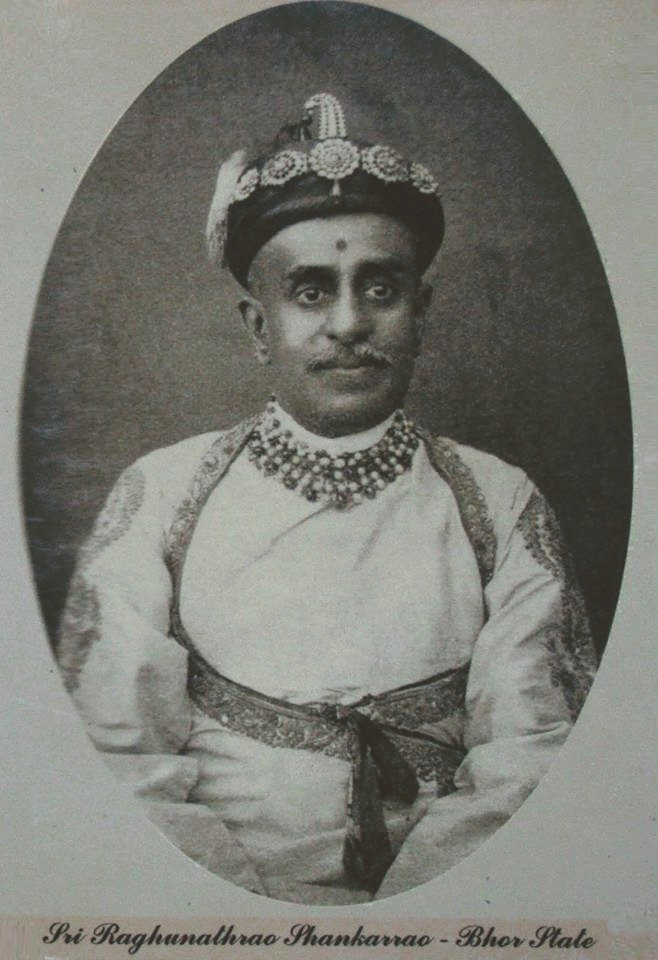
Raja Raghunathrao in 1950

Raja Sir Raghunathrao Shankarrao Gandekar (also known as Babasaheb Pandit Pant Sachiv) KCIE, KGSJM, KECM, KGCM, DD (20 September 1878 – 27 August 1951) was the 11th ruler of the princely state of Bhor of British Raj during the reign (1922–1951). During his reign, he implemented many reforms such as abolition of untouchability, freedom of association and introduction of representative government. He signed the accession to the Indian Union on 8 March 1948 which ended the separate existence of Bhor state.

== Early years ==
Raghunathrao Shankarrao was born to Pant Sachiv Shankarao II Chimnajirao (10th Raja of Bhor) and Jijibai Ranisaheb on 20 September 1878. His thread ceremony took place on 4 April 1887. He succeeded as 11th Raja of Bhor on 18 July 1922 following the death of his father.

Raghunathrao attended the Poona Government High School, Poona and he passed his matriculation examination of the University of Bombay in the year 1899. He completed his higher education from Deccan college, Poona. While at the college he also attended the Law lectures regularly till 1905. After leaving the college, he read the Civil, Criminal and Revenue laws with a celebrated Government Law lecturer and Public prosecutor at Poona to prepare himself for the future as the Raja of Bhor. On the advice of the then Political agent of Bhor Mr. L. C. Swifte, he used to attend the court of H. F. Carvalho, the city magistrate of Poona in order to gain some knowledge of the practical working of Law in 1905. He took an intelligent interest in the proceedings of the court and also read through and studied several important cases that were placed at his disposal.

After the observation for a long time, Mr. Carvalho wrote to Mr. Swifte that:

I think Shrimant Babasaheb now fully understands the procedure of a criminal court and he has no doubt profited by attending the court.

In 1907, on the recommendation of Mr. Swifte, he was appointed to the bench of Magistrates in Poona to gain practical experience in criminal law. He served in this capacity as an honorary bench magistrate for the next six years, during which he became familiar with the conduct of criminal court proceedings. While living and working in Poona, his role and education brought him into regular contact with local officials, statesmen, successive Governors of Bombay, commissioners, and political agents.

Mr. W. D. Sheppard the political agent and the Collector of Poona wrote a letter addressing Shrimant Babasaheb to his father His Highness Shankarrao Raosaheb:

He is held in high esteem by all who have been brought in contact with him, as an honourable and unassuming young nobleman of the highest character, actuated my strong desire to get for himself, by such steady habit, such experience as is open to him.

Raja Ragunathrao received two coronation medals as Yuvaraja, the first at the time of Coronation Darbar of King Edward VII in 1903 and the second at the time of coronation darbar of Imperial King George V in 1911. In June 1903 Shrimant Babasaheb was honoured with a Silver Medal at the hands of Lord Northcote, the then Governor of Bombay. In 1912 he was honoured by the same silver medal by Mr. L. C. Swifte, the political agent of Bhor and Collector of Poona on the behalf of Government.

As Yuvaraja (crown prince) Raghunathrao also administered Vichitragad taluka. As a Yuvaraja he was well prepared by the knowledge of law and its procedure. His father rightly thought it proper to entrust him the management of Vichitragad taluka. He conferred with the powers of Assistant Collector, Sub-divisional Magistrate and Assistant Judge in 1913. From thence till his accession he looked to the affairs of that taluka with great ability, interest and zeal.

In the year 1916 the Honorable Mr. W. D. Sheppard, Member of the executive council in his speech before proceeding to England, observed with the reference to Shrimant Babasaheb as follows:

You were Young when you were first introduced to me and although at that time you were in poor state of health, you were studious and I have now very great pleasure to find that you have fulfilled the expectation that I had formed of you that time you have justified what I had then thought of you.

In 1918 Shrimant Babasaheb was appointed Assistant Recruiting Officer for the whole State and his vigorous and successful measures in obtaining recruits were highly appreciated by the Government of Bombay.

== Marriage ==
Raghunathrao married Gangutai, the daughter of Balasaheb Vinchurkar on 1 June 1893. The couple had their first son Sadashivrao Raghunathrao Gandekar on 27 September 1904. Gangutai died in the year 1907. The death of her was a heavy blow to Raghunathrao. The dejection made him never to think of marriage again but at the Express and solicitous wish of his parents he married Laxmibai Ranisaheb, the daughter of Vasudeorao G. Puranik of Poona in 1909. Raghunathrao had two sons and a daughter with Laxmibai. They were called Anandrao Raghunathrao Gandekar, Narayanrao Raghunathrao Gandekar and Vijayadevi. Rajasaheb's, second son Anandrao Raghunathrao Gandekar was born on 29 June 1922, the third son Narayanrao Raghunathrao Gandekar was born on 18 May 1924 and the daughter Vijayadevi was born on 4 January 1927.

== Reign ==
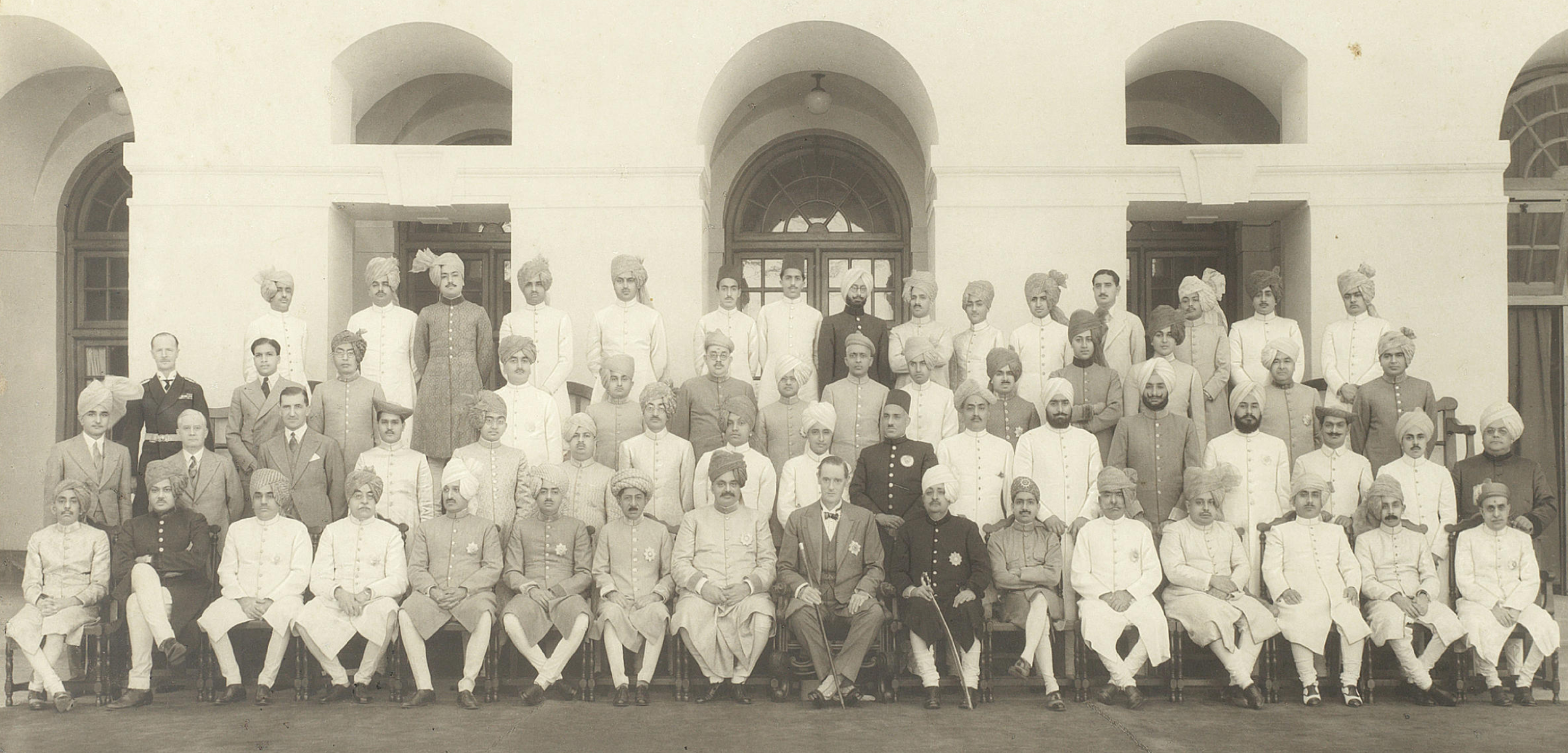
Raja of Bhor, Raghunathrao Shankarrao Pant Sachiv with the other members of Chamber of Princes.

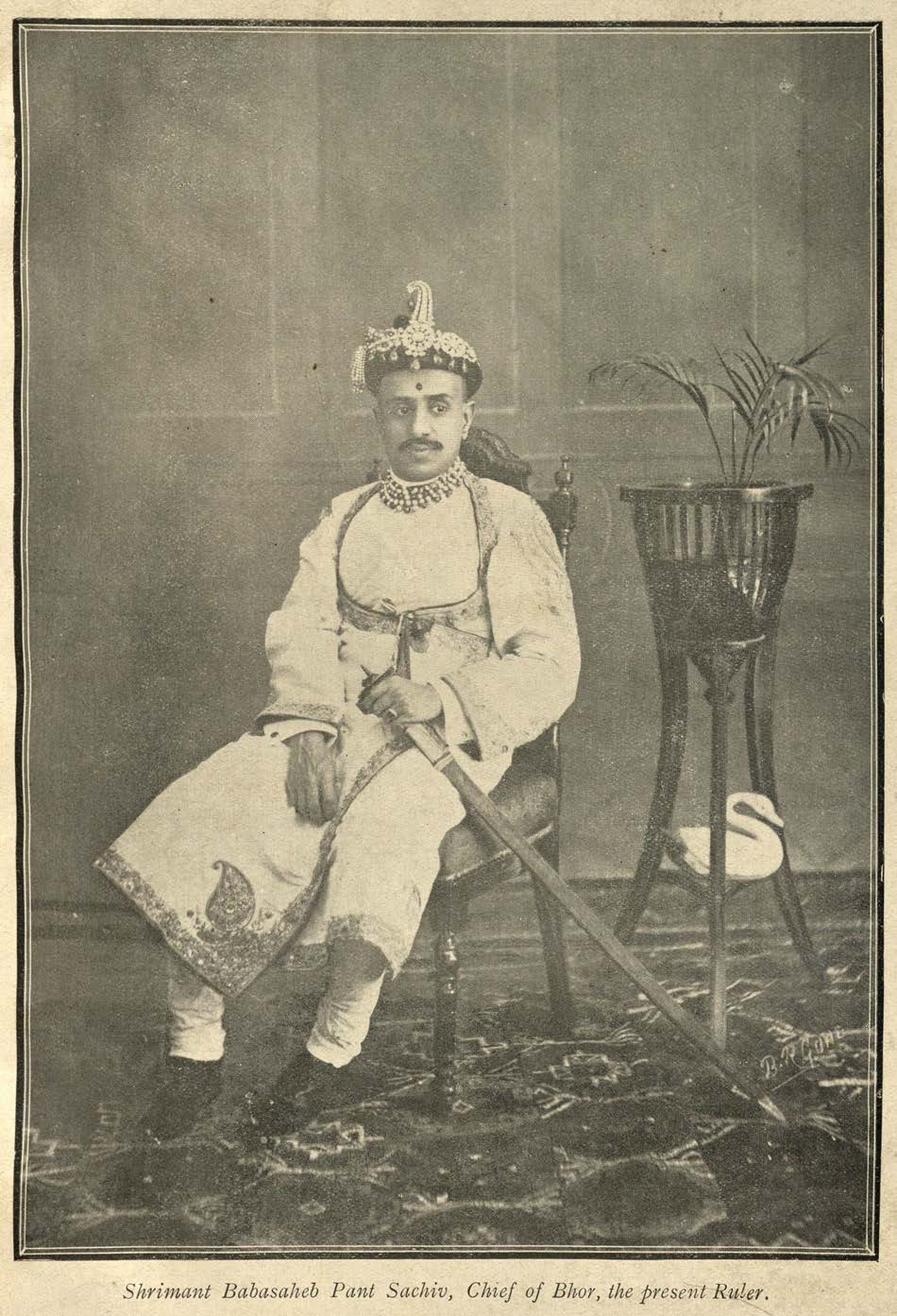
Raja Raghunathrao at his palace in 1930.

As a prince, he is noted for his love of learning, progressive democratic views, Sociable nature and nobility of character. His accession to the gadi of Bhor State was heralded as new era in the history of State. At the very outset, Rajasaheb removed the longstanding and legitimate grievances of his subjects by giving them the freedom of thought, speech, and association and by abolishing certain invidious medieval type of taxes. The most outstanding feature during his reign is the rapid progress of the constitutional reforms. He also established a Lokpaksh to resolve conflicts between the common-folk and the gentry of the State, with the help of Chandrashekhar Agashe, who had been appointed by his father, the 10th Raja, as chief justice to the royal court in 1920.

He started an independent high court scheme and inaugurated it in 1928. He made Primary Education free in 1921. He introduced Scholarships and Freeships for higher education. He built a Library in 1928 in Bhor. He also built Raghunathrao High School at Bhor in 1937.

In order to facilitate the speedy disposal of the routine work of the various departments and to derive the help and advantage of joint views and deliberations in deciding important matters, an Executive council or Cabinet of five members, including Shrimant Rajasaheb was created in 1925. This step was taken as an auspicious beginning to replace the old and Moribund System of aristocratic rule by Democratic System of Government to meet modern requirements in accordance with the assurance given by him at the time of his accession.

The constitution of the Cabinet is as given below:

1. President – The head of the council
2. Diwan – General charge of all the departments (Vice President)
3. Nyayamantri (Judicial Officer) – in charge of the educational, jail and medical departments
4. Daftardar (Chief Revenue Officer) – in charge of the revenue, the forest and P. W.Departments
5. Private Secretary

From 1925 Shrimant Babasaheb has been conducting the administration with the aid of this council.

During his reign as Raja, Raghunathrao had the following diwans (prime ministers):

1. G. V. Dhayagude
2. Rao Sahib V. G. Ranade

The following are the Shaladikharis (education superintendents):

1. V. N. Joshi

== Reforms ==
=== Reforms in education ===
Ever since his accession, to eradicate illiteracy and ignorance among the masses Shrimant Rajasaheb has done utmost to advance the cause of education in his State. Rajasaheb had constructed primary and secondary schools in more than 56 villages with a population of 500 and more. Raja constructed a High School and a separate girls school in Bhor, the headquarter of the State. He also constructed many private schools, Public Libraries and he also constructed institutions like S. S. Gangutaisaheb Pant Sachiv Vachanalaya at Bhor, the Sarvajanik Vachanalaya at pali, etc. In order to facilitate poor and deserving students of the state for higher education Shrimant Rajasaheb has given a donation of Rs.10,000 to the Willingdon College of the Deccan education society, in appreciation of which the society agreed to allow four students of the Bhor State to study as free students in the Willingdon College or Ferguson College every year. The liberal-minded ruler also set apart a sum of Rs.20,000 from his ancestral charitable fund, the interest on which is being utilised in giving scholarships to most promising but poorly circumstanced students of the State irrespective of consideration of caste, creed and religion, to enable them to pursue higher education.

== Titles ==
Raghunathrao Shankarrao was also known with his full name His Highness, Meherban, Shrimant, Madar-Ul-Maham, Raja Sir Raghunathrao Shankarrao Pandit Babasaheb Pant Sachiv, Raja of Bhor.

The hereditary title of "Raja" was conferred on the Ruler in 1935. He was made a permanent Member of the Chamber of Princes in 1940 and a Knight Commander of the Indian Empire in 1941.

During his life he acquired several titles and honorific-prefix names:

- 1903–1922 Rajkumar Raghunathrao Shankarrao Pant Sachiv
- 1922–1935 Meherban, Madar-Ul-Maham Raghunathrao Shankarrao, Pant Sachiv of Bhor
- 1935–1941 His Highness Shrimant Meherban, Madar-Ul-Maham, Raja Raghunathrao Shankarrao Pandit Pant Sachiv, Raja of Bhor
- 1941–1948 His Highness Shrimant Meherban, Madar-Ul-Maham, Raja, Sir Raghunathrao Shankarrao Pandit Pant Sachiv, Raja of Bhor, KCIE

== Honours ==
(Ribbon bar, as it would look today; UK decorations only)

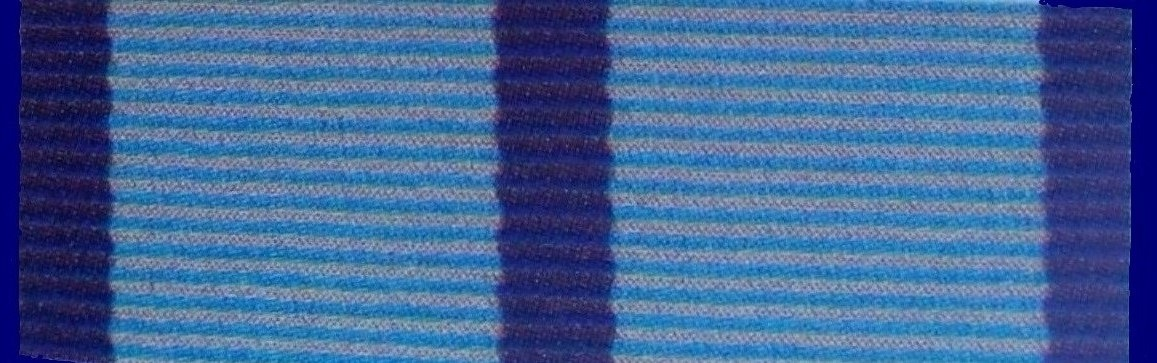

- In 1903, he was honored with King Edward VII Coronation Medal.
- Delhi Durbar Medal - Silver, 1903.
- In 1911, he was awarded with King George V Coronation Medal.
- Delhi Durbar Medal - Silver, 1911.
- In 1927, he was granted 9-gun salute.
- On 3 June 1935, he was honoured with hereditary title "Raja".
- In 1935, he was awarded the King George V Silver Jubilee Medal.
- In 1937, he received King George VI Coronation Medal.
- On 1 January 1941, he was awarded Knights Commander of the Order of the Indian Empire (KCIE).
- In 1949, Rajasaheb received the Indian Independence Medal.

== Books ==
The books written by Rajasaheb are:

- Twentyone weeks in Europe (1930)
- Annual Administration Report of the Bhor State for 1924-25.
- Royal Coronation and my second trip to Europe, 1937.

Biography of Rajasaheb
The biography of the Raja is written by his Dewan V. G. Ranade and the book is:

- Life of His Highness Raja Shreemant Sir Raghunathrao S.: Alias Babasaheb Pandit Pant Sachiv, K.C.I.E., Raja of Bhor by V. G. Ranade.

Other books
Dewan V. G. Ranade along with Shaladikhari V. N. Joshi wrote a book on the progress, sacrifices of the Rajas right from the establishment by Shankaraji Narayan Sacheev Gandekar to the Last ruler Raghunathrao Shankarrao Gandekar, the book is:

- A short history of the Bhor state.

== See also ==
- Bhor State
- Shankaraji Narayan Sacheev

== Bibliography ==
- McClenaghan, Tony (1996). Indian Princely Medals: A Record of the Orders, Decorations, and Medals of the Indian Princely States. Lancer Publishers. ISBN 9781897829196.
- Tagare, Ganesh Vasudeo (1987). Historical Grammar of Apabhraṁśa. Motilal Banarsidass Publications. ISBN 9788120802902.
- Bhargava, R. P. (1991). The Chamber of Princes. Northern Book Centre. ISBN 9788172110055.
- Ranade, V. G. (1930). A Short history of the Bhor State. Bhor.
- GOI, Central (1931). List Of Ruling Princes And Chiefs In Political Relations With The Government Of Bombay And Their Leading Officials Nobles And Personages.

Raghunathrao Shankarrao Gandekar Royal family of Bhor Born: c. 20 September 1878 Died: 1951
Regnal titles
Preceded by Shankarao II Chimnajirao Pant Sachiv	Raja of Bhor; 1922 – 1951	Succeeded by Monarchy abolished, Bhor merged into Republic of India
