= Shankarrao Chimnajirao Gandekar =

10th Raja of Bhor

- His Highness Raja Meherban Shrimant Pant Sachiv
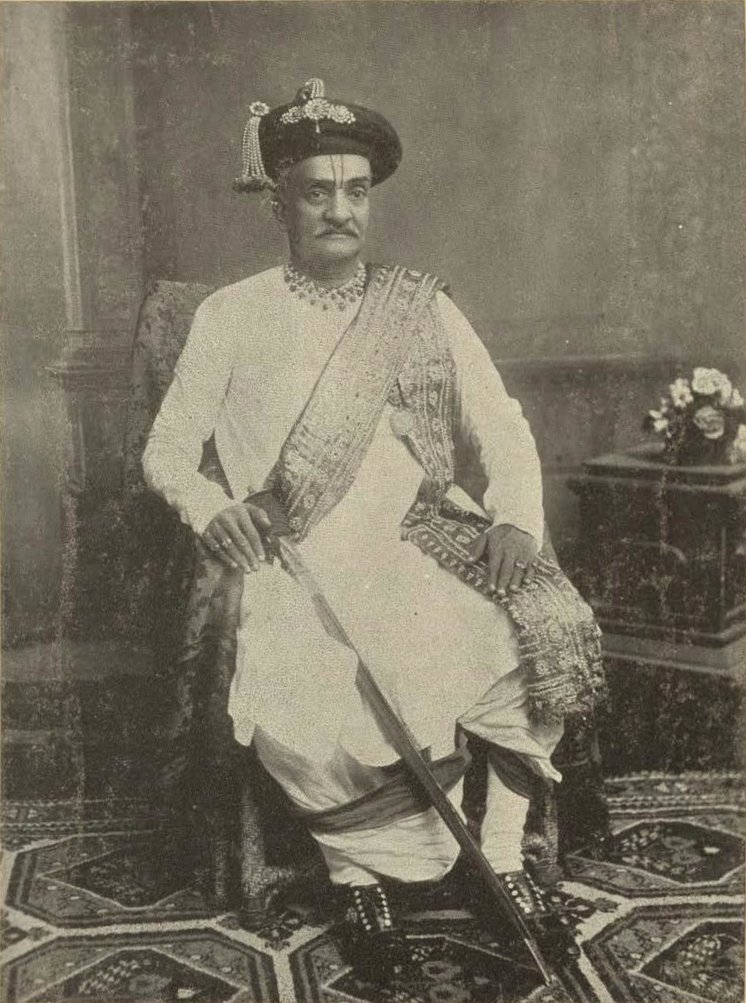
- Photograph of Shankarrao Chimnajirao Gandekar, published in 1911

10th Raja of Bhor State
- Reign: 12 February 1871 – 17 July 1922
- Predecessor: Chimnajirao Raghunathrao Gandekar (father)
- Successor: Raja Raghunathrao Shankarrao Gandekar (son)
- Born: 30 March 1854; Bhor, Bhor State, British India
- Died: 17 July 1922 (aged 68); Bhor Rajwada, Bhor State, British India
- Spouse: Jijibai
- Issue: Raja Raghunathrao Shankarrao Gandekar
- House: Gandekar
- Father: Chimnajirao Raghunathrao Pant Sachiv
- Mother: Saraswatibai (alias Maisaheb)
- Religion: Hinduism

Shrimant Raja Shankarrao Chimnajirao Gandekar, was the 10th ruler of the princely state of Bhor of British Raj during the reign (12 February 1871 – 17 July 1922).

With Doctrine of lapse of the Satara State in 1849, the Pant Sachiv became a tributary of the British Government. In 1820, a Treaty was concluded between the British Government (East India Company). As original British grantee of 1820, Chimnajirao Raghunathrao was made the ruler of Bhor. On 20 July 1874, Shankarrao Chimnajirao Pant Sachiv was installed with full ruling powers on Bhor State.

== Early years ==
Shankarrao Chimnajirao Pant Sachiv was born to Chimnajirao Raghunathrao Pant Sachiv (9th Ruler of Bhor) on 30 March 1854. In 1867 he joined the Poona High School for further studies, which lasted till he came to the Gadi with full powers of Bhor State.

=== Minority Administration ===
Shrimant Raosaheb was 17 years when his father died in 1871. The British Government there upon entrusted the management of the state affairs to his mother Maisaheb as the Regent, who was assisted in her work by two Karbharis, One is appointed by the state government and the other by the British Raj. However Ranisheb Maisaheb died in the year 1873, and the British government on seeing Raosaheb come of age, handed over to him the rulership of his State with full powers in July 1874.

== Marriage ==
Raosaheb married daughter of Sardar Madhavrao Vithal Vinchurkar in 1861, but she died with Cholera within a month after a marriage. Then Raosheb the following year married Jijibai Ranisaheb the daughter of Sardar Krishnarao Vitthal Vinchurkar of the same family.

== Titles ==
Shankarrao Chimnajirao Gandekar was also known with his full name His Highness, Meherban, Shrimant, Raja Shankarrao Chimnajirao Gandekar Pandit Pant Sachiv, Raja of Bhor

== Honours ==
- In 1903, he was honored with King Edward VII Coronation Medal.
- He attended the 1903 Delhi Durbar, and received the Delhi Durbar Medal – Silver, 1903
- In the 1903 Durbar Honours he received the grant of a personal salute of 9 guns.
- In 1911, he was awarded with King George V Coronation Medal.
- Delhi Durbar Medal – Silver, 1911.
- In 1911, he was granted 11-gun salute and honoured with the titles "His Highness" and "Raja".

== Bibliography ==
- McClenaghan, Tony (1996). Indian Princely Medals: A Record of the Orders, Decorations, and Medals of the Indian Princely States. Lancer Publishers. ISBN 9781897829196.
- Ranade, V. G. (1930). A Short history of the Bhor State. Bhor.

Shankarrao Chimnajirao Gandekar Royal family of Bhor Born: c. 30 March 1854 Died: 17 July 1922
Regnal titles
Preceded by Chimnajirao III Raghunathrao Pant Sachiv	Raja of the Bhor State; 1871 – 1922	Succeeded by Raja Shrimant Ragunathrao Shankarrao Pandit Pant Sachiv
