= Bhor State =

Historical Indian state

Coordinates: 18°10′N 73°51′E

- 1697–1948
- Flag

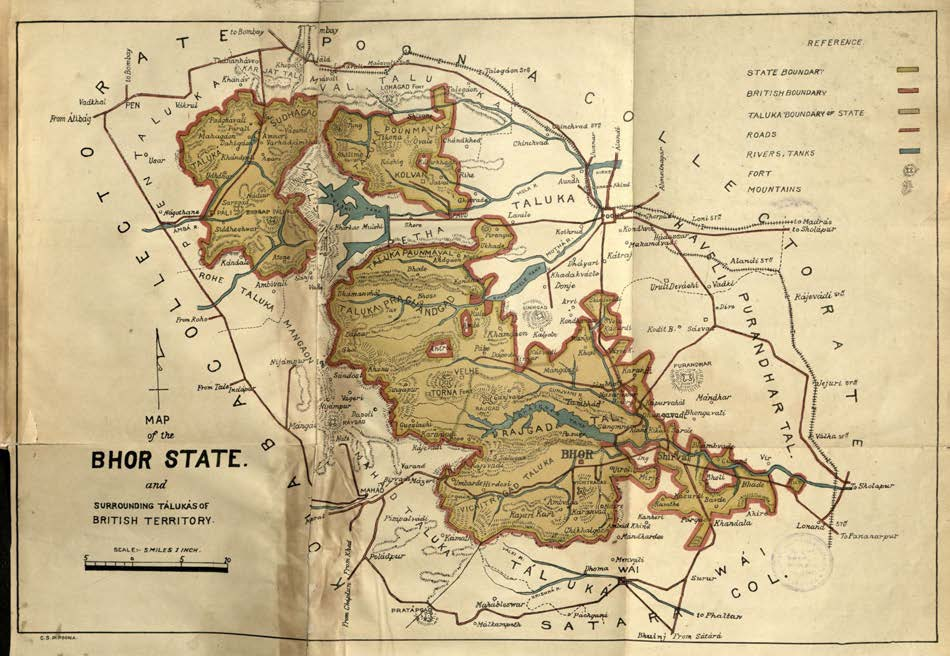
- Map of Bhor State, 1930
- Government: Jagir (until 1849); Princely state (from 1849)
- History
  - Established: 1697
  - Independence of India: 1948

Area
- 1901: 2,396 km^{2} (925 sq mi)

Population
  - 1901: 137,268
Preceded by	Succeeded by
Maratha Empire	India
- Today part of: Maharashtra, India
- This article incorporates text from a publication now in the public domain: Chisholm, Hugh, ed. (1911). "Bhor". Encyclopædia Britannica (11th ed.). Cambridge University Press.

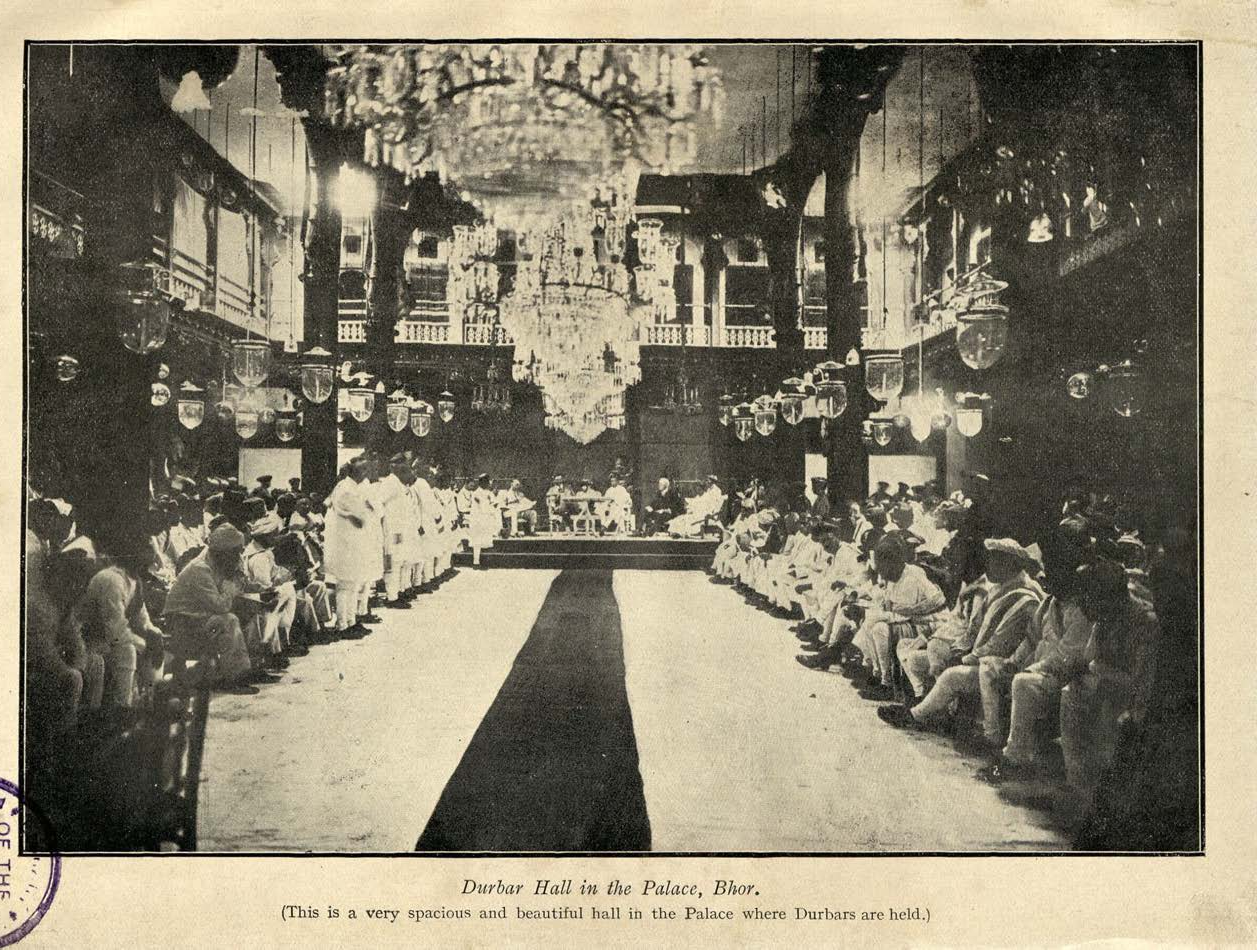
Image of Darbar hall, Bhor Rajwada Palace in 1920s.

Bhor State was one of the 9-gun salute Maratha princely states of Deccan States Agency. It was the only state belonging to the Poona Agency under the Bombay Presidency, which became later part of the Deccan States Agency. Along with Akkalkot State, Aundh State, Phaltan State and Jath State, it was one of the Satara Jagirs. The state merged with the newly independent Indian union in 1948.

Situated among the eastern slopes of the Western Ghats, the state covered an area of 2,396 square kilometres, and had a population of 137,268 in 1901.

The town of Bhor, once the capital of the state, is located in the state of Maharashtra, about 51 kilometres south of Pune, adjacent to Bhatghar Dam. Lord Rama is the family deity of the Gandekars, the former rulers of the state. The seal of the state had images of Sita, Rama and Lakshmana. Every year Ramanavami is celebrated with pomp and grandeur at Bhor Rajwada, the palace of the royal family.

== History ==
The Jagir (fiefdom), which was the forerunner of the state, was granted to Shankaraji Narayan Gandekar for his services as the Pant Sachiv, one of the eight hereditary Maratha ministers, by Rajaram Chhatrapati in 1697.The jagir remained part of the Maratha Empire until the 1818 when Peshwa rule came to an end. The jagir then became part of the shortly lived Satara state with an agreement signed with the British East India Company in 1820. In 1838–39, the state experienced uprising by the Ramoshi against the British.It is believed that personalities associated with the deposed Bajirao II instigated the troubles.

Akalkot, Aundh, Bhor, Daphlapur, Jath, and Phaltan, which were Jagirs of Satara State, became tributaries to the British when Satara state was abolished in 1849.

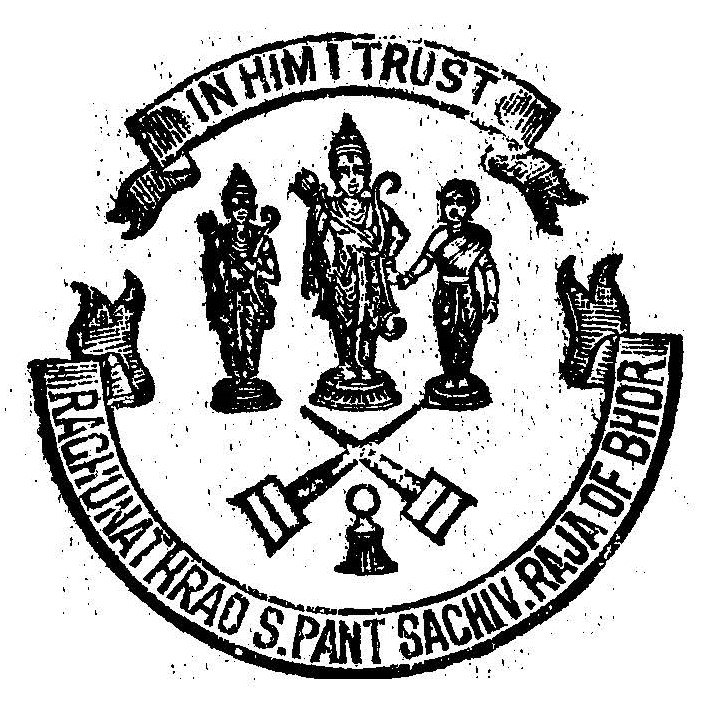
Personal Emblem or Seal of the Gandekar Royal Family

Gandekar, the ruling family of Bhor belonged to a Hindu caste of Deshastha Rigvedi Brahmin community. They used the Maratha title Pant Sachiv until 1935 when the ruler was granted a 9 gun salute and the title of Raja by the British The family deity of the rulers was Lord Rama. Every year the family celebrated the festival of Ramanavami with pomp and grandeur at the Bhor Rajwada (palace). The seal of the state also had images of Sita, Rama and Lakshmana with two swords and a bell at the bottom. The state also controlled other historic forts such as Rajgad, Rohida and Sarasgad.

Raghunathrao Shankarrao Gandekar was the last Raja of the state. During his reign, he implemented many reforms such as abolition of untouchability, freedom of association and introduction of representative government. He signed the accession to the Indian Union on 8 March 1948 which ended the separate existence of Bhor state.

== Rulers ==
Bhor Hindu rulers used the titles of "Pant Sachiv" and "Raja".

=== Pant Sachivs ===
- 1697 – death 1707: Shankaraji Narayan Sacheev
- 1707 – death March 1737: Naro Shankaraji
- 1737 – death 1757: Chimnaji I
- 1757 – death 1787: Sadasiv Rao
- 1787 – death 1791: Raghunath Rao
- 1797 – death 1798: Shankr Rao I
- 1798 – death 1827: Pantsachiv Chimnaji Rao II
- 1827 – death 1837: Pantsachiv Raghunath Rao I Chimnaji Rao
- 1837 – death 12 February 1871: Pantsachiv Chimnaji Rao III Raghunath Rao

=== Rajas ===
- (12 February 1871 - 17 July 1922) - His Highness Raja Shrimant Shankarrao Chimnajirao Pandit Pant Sachiv
- (18 July 1922 -15 August 1947) - Raja Shrimant Sir Raghunathrao Shankarrao Babasaheb Pandit Pantsachiv "Baba Sahib"; (died 1951), last ruler

== Gallery ==
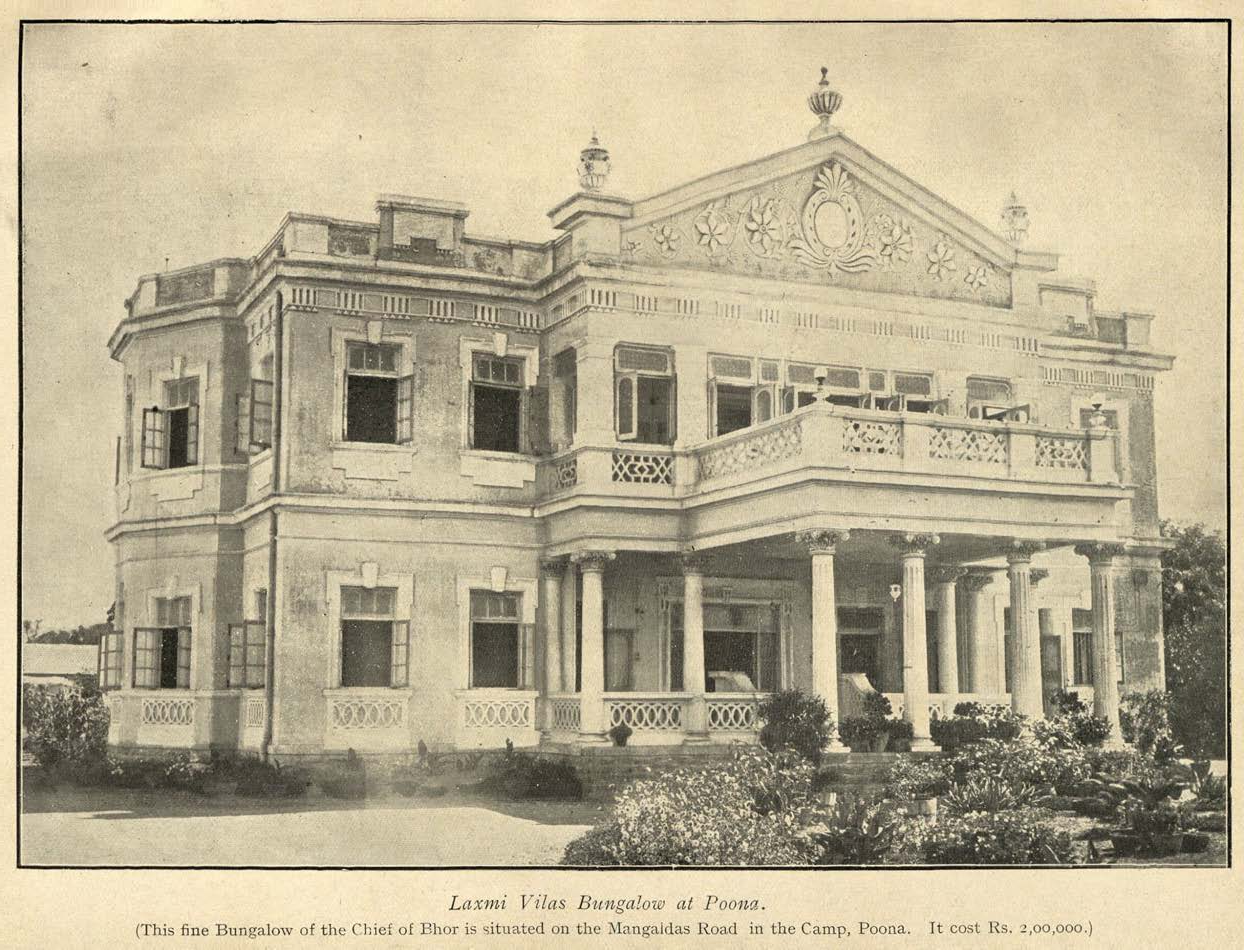
1930s Portrait of Lakshmi Vilas Palace, Pune of Gandekar Royal family.

== See also ==
- List of Maratha dynasties and states
- List of Brahmin dynasties and states
- Pant Sachiv family
- Political integration of India
