= Gaurishankar Hirachand Ojha =

Indian historian (1863–1947)

Dr. Gaurishankar Hirachand Ojha
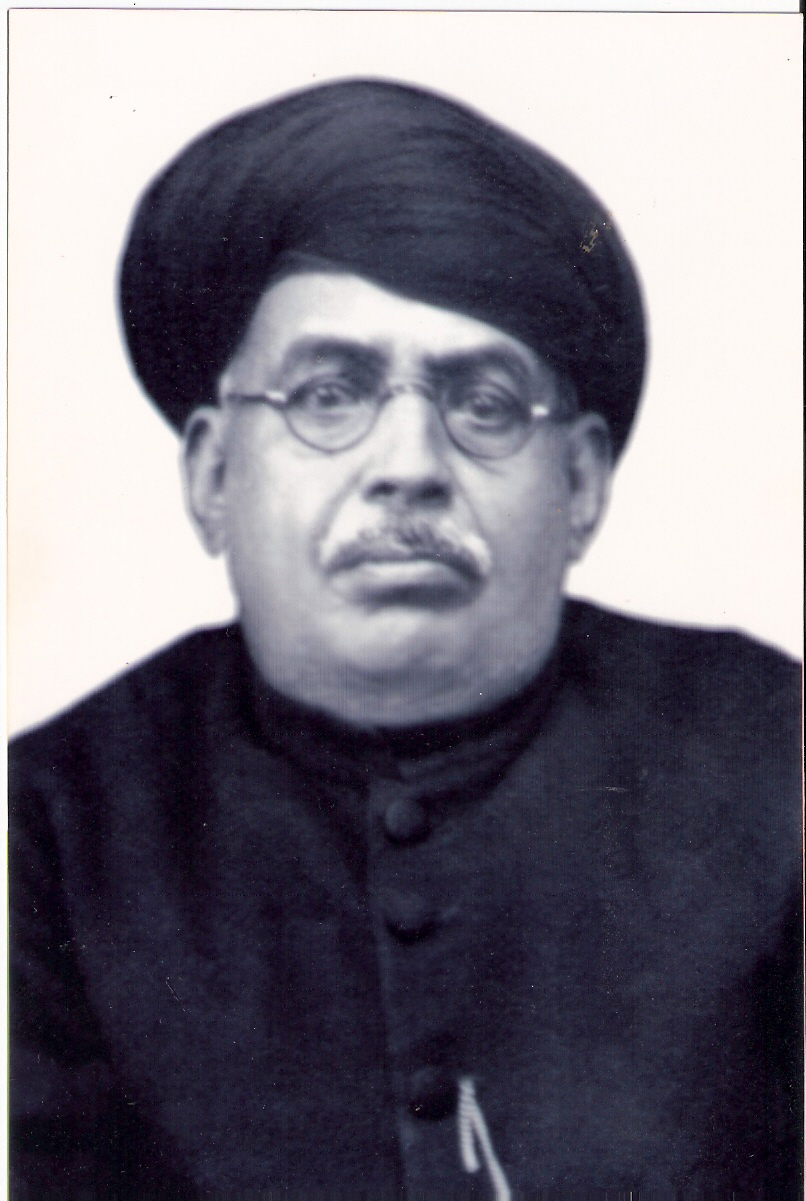

Personal details
- Born: 15 September 1863 Rohida, Sirohi State, Rajputana
- Died: 17 April 1947 (aged 83) Rohida, Sirohi State, Rajputana

Gaurishankar Hirachand Ojha, Rai Bahadur, (15 September, 1863– 17 April, 1947), born in Rohida village of Sirohi District, was a historian from the Indian state of Rajasthan. A prolific author, he wrote several books (in Hindi) on the history of Rajasthan and other historical subjects. Subsequent historians from Rajasthan have referred to him as Guruvara Mahamahopadhyaya (e.g. Dasharatha Sharma in Early Chauhan Dynasties). Ojha regarded Kaviraj Shyamaldas as his guru and worked under him as assistant secretary of the historical department, Udaipur

== Early life and education ==
Dr. Ojha was born in a Audichya Brahmins family, his father's name was Hirachand Ojha. His primary education was completed at his home and then he moved to Bombay for further education, where he learnt about Scripts, Archaeology and History. Thereafter, he came to Udaipur, where Maharana Fateh Singh appointed him as Head of State Archaeological Department.

In 1908, Dr. Ojha was appointed as Head of Rajputana Museum, Ajmer. He worked on this post for 38 years.

== Authorship ==
In 1894, Dr. Ojha published his Bharatiya Prachin Lipimala (the first book devoted to the palæography of India), a revised edition was published in 1918. Dr. Ojha penned Solankiyon ka Itihasa (History of the Solanki) in 1907 and Sirohi Rajya ka Itihasa (History: Kingdom of Sirohi) in 1911. In 1926, Ojha published the first book of his History of Rajputana series. Histories of the princely states of Udaipur, Jodhpur, Bikaner, Dungarpur, Banswara released over a twelve-year period (1929–1941). Ojha also wrote a biography of James Tod titled Supraprasiddha itihaskara Karnala James Tod ka jivan charitra. A 1928 lecture series at the Hindustani Akademi, Allahabad was published as Madhyakalina Bharatiya Sanskriti and later translated into Urdu.

== Honours and awards ==
- Rai Bahadur in 1914.
- In 1927, the All India Hindi Sahitya Sammelan conferred the honorary degree of Mahamahopadhayaya (greatest of venerable teachers) on Ojha. In celebration of his seventieth birthday, the Hindi Sahitya Sammelan, Allahabad brought out and presented to Ojha a felicitation volume (containing original articles from several scholars) titled Bharatiya Anushilana Grantha.
- Sahitya Vachaspati in 1937.

== Bibliography ==
=== Books on history of Rajasthan and constituent kingdoms ===
- Banswara Rajya ka Itihasa (History: Kingdom of Banswara). First published 1937. Publisher: Rajasthani Granthaghar, Jodhpur 1998.
- Bikaner Rajya Ka Itihasa (History: Kingdom of Bikaner), First published 1937. Publisher: Rajasthani Granthaghar, Jodhpur 2007. ISBN 8186103139 (Vol I) ISBN 8186103147 (Vol II).
- Dungarpur Rajya ka Itihasa (History: Kingdom of Dungarpur). First published 1936. Publisher: Rajasthani Granthaghar, Jodhpur 2000. ISBN 8187720018.
- Jodhpur Rajya ka Itihasa (History: Kingdom of Jodhpur). Publisher: Vaidika Yantralaya, Ajmer 1938.
- Marwar Rajya ka Itihasa (History: Kingdom of Marwar),1938.
- Pratapgarh Rajya ka Itihasa (History: Kingdom of Pratapgarh). Publisher: Rajasthani Granthaghar, Jodhpur 2000. ISBN 8187720026.
- Rajputane ka Itihas (History of Rajputana), Publisher: Vaidika Yantralaya, Ajmer 1927.
- Sirohi Rajya ka Itihasa (History: Kingdom of Sirohi), 1911.
- Solankiyon ka Pracin Itihas (Early history of the Solanki). First published 1907. Publisher: Sabda Mahima Prakasan, Jaipur, 1995.
- Udaipur Rajya ka Itihasa (History: Kingdom of Udaipur). Publisher: Rajasthani Granthaghar, Jodhpur 1999–2006. ISBN 818610318X (Vol I) ISBN 8186103198 (Vol II).
- Vir-Siromani Maharana Pratapsimha:Sacitra (Exploits of Pratapsingh: Maharana of Mewar) First published 1928. Publisher Rajasthani Granthaghar, Jodhpur 1998. ISBN 8186103392.
- Bharatiya Pracheen Lipimala Publisher: Publication Scheme, Jaipur 2008 ISBN 8181760425

=== Books on other subjects ===
- Asokakalina dharmika abhilekha (Religious inscriptions from the reign of Ashoka). G.H. Ojha and Shyam Sunder Das; Prastavana, V.K. Mathura. Publisher: Bharatiya Kala Prakashan, Delhi 2002 (In Prakrit, Sanskrit and Hindi). ISBN 81-86050-76-0.
- Bharatiya Prachin Lipimala (The palæography of India). First published 1894. Publisher of 3rd edition Munshiram Manoharlal, New Delhi 1971.
- Bharatiya Sahitya ki Ruparekha (Outline of Indian Literature). Publisher: Bharatiya Granthaghar, Lucknow 1956.
- Madhyakalina Bharatiya Sanskriti (Indian culture in the Middle Ages). Publisher: Hindustani Akademi, Allahabad, 1945.
- Quarun-i Vusta men Hindustani Tahzib, sanah 600 se sanah 1100 tak (Urdu translation of above listing) Translated by Prem Chand. Publisher: Hindustani Akademi, Allahabad.
- Nagari Anka aur Akshara (Evolution of Devnagari numerals and alphabet). G.H. Ojha, Keshavdev Mishra. Tenth edition 1949. Publisher: Hindi Sahitya Sammelana, Prayaga 2006.
- Prachin Bharatiya Abhilekha (Ancient Indian inscriptions). Publisher: Bharatiya Kala Prakashan, Delhi 2006. ISBN 8180900924.
- Suprasiddha itihaskara Karnala James Tod ka jivana charitra (Biography of Col. James Tod). Publisher: Rajasthani Granthaghar, Jodhpur 2002.
- Ojha Nibandh Sangrah (Collection of Article)by publisher: Shabd Mahima Prakashan, Jaipur 2010. ISBN 978-81-9265575-8.

=== Commemorative volume ===
- Bharatiya anushilana grantha [Festschrift (festival of writing/celebratory publication) honouring Gaurishankar Hiranchand Ojha on his seventieth birthday, includes articles on Hindi literature]. Publisher: Hindi Sahitya Sammelana, Prayaga 1933.

=== Collected works ===
- Ojha Nibandha Sangraha. Publisher: Udayapura Sahitya Samsthan, Rajasthan Visva Vidyapith, 1954.

=== Edited books ===
- Muhonata Nainasi ki khyata. Hindi translation by Ramanarayan Dugar. In 2 volumes. Editor Volume 2: G.H. Ojha. Publisher: Nagaripracharini Sabha, Kashi 1934.
- Prachina Mudra (Coins of ancient India) by Rakhal Das Banerji, translated by Ramchandra Varma. Editor G.H. Ojha. Publisher: Nagaripracharini Sabha, Varanasi 1992.
- Prithvirajavijaya (Poem in Sanskrit on Prithviraja III by Jayanaka in 12th century CE and commentary of Jonaraja). Edited by G. H. Ojha and Chandradhar Sharma Guleri. First published 1941. Publisher: Rajasthani Granthaghar, Jodhpur 1997.

=== Edited commemorative volume ===
- Koshotsava Smaraka Sangraha. Collection of articles on Hindi language and literature to mark completion of Hindi shabdkosh (dictionary). Dedicated to the memory of Shyam Sundar Das. First published 1927. Editor: G.H. Ojha. Publisher: Nagari Pracharini Sabha, Varanasi 1985.

=== Catalogue of publications ===
- Mahamahopadhyaya Raibahadur Pandit Gaurishankar Hirachand Ojha Sangraha Suchee. Principal Editor Dharmapala Sharma; Editors Ishvarsingh Ranawat, Mohabbatsingh Rathore. Publisher: Pratap Shodha Prathishtan, Udaipur 2008.
