= Shankaraji Narayan Gandekar =

Shankaraji Narayan Gaudekar

Rajadnya to Chhatrapati Sambhaji, Sacheev of the Maratha Kingdom, First Chief of Bhor (founder)
- Reign: 1699 – November 1707
- Successor: Naro Shankaraji
- Born: 1665; Maval (Pune District, Maharashtra)
- Died: November 1707 (aged 41–42); Ambawde (Pune District, Maharashtra)
- Issue: Naro Shankaraji Gandekar
- House: Gandekar
- Religion: Hindu, Deshastha Brahmin

Shankaraji Narayan Gaudekar (1665–1707), also known as Shankaraji Narayan Sacheev or Shankaraji Narayan, was a popular Minister (Pradhan) and Count (Sardar) of the Maratha Kingdom. He also served as Imperial Secretary (Sacheev) during Rajaram's reign. He also served as Deputy to the Crown (Rajadnya) under Sambhaji. His contribution to the war of independence against Mughal rule is considered to be immensely supportive. He was also the founder of the princely state of Bhor located, in Pune district.

== Early life and career ==
Shankaraji was born in a Deshastha Brahmin family in or around 1665. His grandfather was an Officer-in-confidence of Shivaji's father Shahaji, and his father Naro Mukund was a Sabnis of Fort Sudhagad during Shivaji's regime. Being friendly and watchful since childhood, Shankraji became well conversant with the people and geography of the Maval region of Maharashtra at a very early age. In 1677, he started his career under Peshwa Moropant Pingale, and soon he was engrossed by Ramchandra Pant Amatya for the purpose of some special assignments in the Maval region. During Sambhaji's reign, he was awarded the post of Deputy to the Crown (Rajadnya) for his excellent performance in his field. He had in his charge the Subha of Mawal and north Konkan.

== Contribution to the Maratha War of Independence ==
After the execution of Sambhaji by Aurangzeb in 1689, Shankaraji gathered his soldiers in Maval and started attacking nearby Mughal forces. Initially, he conquered the forts of Wai and Rajgad. Thereafter, jointly with Ramchandra Pant Amatya, he captured the forts of Pratapgad, Rohida, Torna and Purandar. Aurangzeb's General Shaikh Nijam was also defeated by him near Sangameshwar. Jointly with Ramchandra Pant, Santaji and Dhanaji, he attacked another Mughal General Sarjah Khan near Satara and vanquished his army. Rajaram was so delighted with his victories that he conferred on him the post of Sacheeva (Secretary) in October 1690 and, additionally, he was given charge of the entire Konkan region. Thenceforth, Dhanaji was directed to work under his supervision. He was also responsible for Rajaram's Zanana (Queens) at fort Karigad. As mentioned in the Jedhe Shakawali, he quickly shifted the Zanana to fort Sudhagad during the capture of Karigad by Alibaig, the Mughal Officer at Junnar, and later on recaptured the fort. He also captured Fort Siddhgad located near Bhimashankar through his subordinate Gunaji Sawant.

== Later career and death ==
After Rajaram's death in 1700, Shankaraji became one of the closest advisors of Rajaram's Queen Tarabai. Jointly with Parshuram Pant Pratinidhi, he helped Tarabai to enable her son Shivaji II to occupy the vacant throne of Rajaram. In 1705, he captured fort Rohida and re-annexed fort Rajgad to the Maratha Kingdom. In 1707 after Shahu's release from Mughal camp civil war between Shahu and Tarabai commenced. Shahu appealed Shankaraji to join him or face the consequences. Shankaraji who was loyal to Tarabai was caught into a great perplexity and depression and ultimately committed suicide in November 1707 at Ambawde near Nagnath. A deeply moved Shahu appointed Shankaraji's orphan son Naro Shankar on his vacant post.

== Bibliography ==
- Copland, Ian (1982). The British Raj and the Indian princes: paramountcy in western India, 1857-1930. Sangam Books. ISBN 9780861312450.
