= Delhi Durbar Medal (1911) =

Medal commemorating the coronation of King George V as Emperor of India

Delhi Durbar Medal, 1911
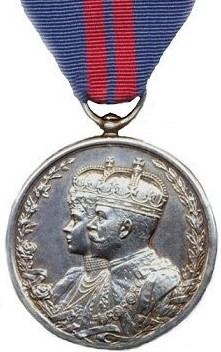
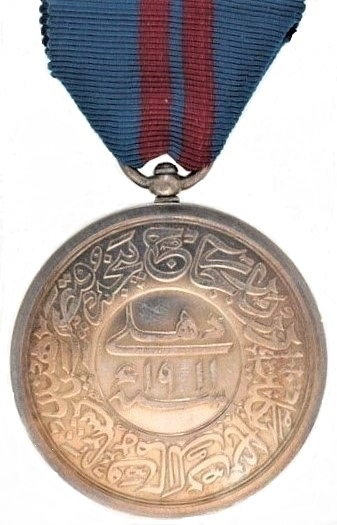
- Obverse and reverse of 1911 Durbar Medal
- Type: Commemoration medal
- Awarded for: Participation in Durbar or broader service to the Indian Empire
- Presented by: United Kingdom and British Raj
- Established: 1911

Highlights
- Total: 200 gold and 26,800 silver medals
- Ribbon bar

Delhi Durbar Medals were instituted by the United Kingdom to commemorate the Delhi Durbar where the new Emperor of India was proclaimed, in 1903 for Edward VII, and in 1911 for George V. On both occasions the medals were one and a half inches in diameter and were awarded in both gold and silver. They were worn in date order alongside Coronation and Jubilee medals on the left chest, suspended from a ribbon one and a quarter inches wide. These Royal commemorative medals were worn before campaign medals until November 1918, after which the order of wear was changed, with them now worn after campaign medals and before long service awards.

== Delhi Durbar Medal, 1911 ==
Obverse: The conjoined crowned busts of King George V and Queen Mary facing left within a floral wreath of roses.
Reverse: A legend in Persian, which translates as The Durbar of George V, Emperor of India, Master of the British Land.
The medal was awarded unnamed.

Two hundred gold medals were struck for award to ruling chiefs and high-ranking officials. 30,000 silver medals were struck, with 26,800 awarded to civic dignitaries, government officials, and including 10,000 to officers and men of the British and Indian armies. The medal was distributed, not only to those present at the Durbar, but to others throughout India who contributed to the Raj.

The ribbon was similar as for the medal for King George's Coronation light blue with two thin red stripes in the middle, and while the obverse design is the same, the Durbar Medal is larger, being 1½ inches in diameter, compared with 1¼ inches for the Coronation Medal. Both medals could not be worn together, and those eligible for both wore a clasp bearing the word 'Delhi' on the ribbon of the Coronation Medal.

Durbar clasp for Coronation Medal ribbon

== Issuance ==
From the British forces present, 905 silver medals were awarded to officers and only 3266 to British other ranks – so that approximately a quarter of the British troops actually having participated in the Durbar celebrations received a medal.

Duckers notes there must have been disappointment that a minority of men in a regiment got the medal whereas the majority did not, despite also having been participated in the same event. One consequence is that medal collectors often come across Delhi Durbar medals in medal groups, not documented on the medal roll as officially issued, that have been self-awarded by those who were present at the Durbar, and felt that they had a right to wear the medal.

== See also ==
- Delhi Durbar Medal (1903)
- Delhi Durbar
- British colonial India
- Empress of India Medal
