= Ramchandra Varma =

Indian lexicographer, journalist and writer

- रामचन्द्र वर्मा
- Born: January 8, 1890; Kashi (now Varanasi), India
- Died: 1969 (aged 78–79)
- Occupations: Lexicographer, journalist, grammarian, translator, writer
- Writing career
- Language: Hindi
- Genres: Lexicography, grammar
- Subjects: Hindi language, Hindi literature
- Notable works: Manak Hindi Kosh; Sankshipt Hindi Shabda Sagar; Achchhi Hindi; Manak Hindi Vyakaran; Pramanik Hindi Kosh; Urdu-Hindi Kosh
- Notable awards: Padma Shri by Government of India (1958)

Ramchandra Varma, also known as Acharya Ramchandra Varma (8 January 1890 – 1969) was an Indian lexicographer, journalist, grammarian, translator, and writer. He is known for his contributions to Hindi lexicography through his work on the Hindi Shabda Sagar, Manak Hindi Kosh, and other dictionaries and grammar books. He also worked as a journalist and translated several works into Hindi. He worked on the Hindi edition of Bal Gangadhar Tilak's Marathi newspaper Kesari. He was awarded the Padma Shri in 1958.

His books Achchhi Hindi (1944), Hindi Prayog (1946), and Manak Hindi Vyakaran (1961) were written to promote standardized Hindi usage and address common grammatical and stylistic errors.

== Life and career ==
Ramchandra Varma was born on 8 January 1890 in Kashi (now Varanasi). His father was Diwan Parmeshwari Das. Although he received little formal education, he taught himself several languages, such as Hindi, Urdu, Persian, Marathi, Bengali, Gujarati, and English.

Varma started his career in journalism. In 1907, he joined the Hindi edition of Kesari, the Marathi newspaper founded by Bal Gangadhar Tilak, and served as its editor in Nagpur. He later became the editor of Bihar Bandhu, a newspaper published from Bankipore.

He served as the assistant editor of the Hindi Shabda Sagar project at the Nagari Pracharini Sabha in Kashi from 1910 to 1929. He also worked in the lexicography departments of several literary publications and established the Sahitya Ratnamala Karyalaya. He promoted the use of standard Hindi in writing and speech.

He died in 1969.

== Literary work ==
Varma worked on Hindi lexicography and language studies. He compiled the five-volume Manak Hindi Kosh, published by the Hindi Sahitya Sammelan. He also edited the Sankshipt Hindi Shabda Sagar and prepared several dictionaries and language reference books.

His notable original works include;

- Achchhi Hindi
- Hindi Prayog
- Manak Hindi Vyakaran
- Hindi Kosh Rachna
- Shabd Aur Arth
- Shabd Sadhana
- Shabdarth Darshan
- Koshkala
- Pramanik Hindi Kosh
- Urdu-Hindi Kosh

Varma also translated a number of works from other languages into Hindi. His translated works include;

- Hindi Gyaneshwari
- Dasbodh
- Hindu Rajtantra
- Samyavad Dharm Ki Utpatti Aur Vikas
- Purani Duniya
- Chhatrasal
- Prachin Mudra
- Rifle
- Devalok

== Awards and reception ==
In an essay published in Kosh-Vigyan: Siddhant Aur Prayog (1989), linguist Badri Nath Kapoor described Varma as one of the leading figures in Hindi lexicography and credited his works Achchhi Hindi and Hindi Prayog with drawing attention to common errors in written Hindi and promoting standard language usage.

His book, Achchhi Hindi was prescribed in the curricula of several institutions, including the University of Madras, the University of Calcutta, Banaras Hindu University, Nagpur University, the University of Lucknow, Agra University, Patna University, University of Allahabad, Aligarh Muslim University, and the University of Travancore, in addition to examinations conducted by organisations such as the Hindi Sahitya Sammelan, Rashtrabhasha Prachar Samiti, and Dakshina Bharat Hindi Prachar Sabha. His book Hindi Prayog was adopted for the High School examinations of the United Provinces, Bihar, Rajputana, and Madhya Bharat, as well as by the Prayag Mahila Vidyapeeth and the Prathama examination of the Hindi Sahitya Sammelan, Prayag.

Achchhi Hindi received praise from several contemporary scholars. Ayodhya Singh Upadhyay praised the work and suggested that it deserved the title Adarsh Hindi (ideal Hindi). Babu Ram Saksena described the book as the product of writer's long experience and hard work and recommended it to Hindi scholars, while Lakshman Narayan Garde regarded it as an important contribution to the development of the national language. In Hindi Vyakaran ka Itihas (2013), author Anant Chaudhary argued that Varma's work, Manak Hindi Vyakaran did not present a standard grammar of Hindi and stated that much of the work was based on the earlier grammars of Kamta Prasad Guru and Kishoridas Vajpeyi, although he considered its discussion of adverbs and indeclinables worthy of consideration.

Varma was awarded the Padma Shri, India's fourth-highest civilian award, by the Government of India in 1958 for his contributions to literature.
