= Bhatghar Dam =

- Location within Maharashtra
- Official name: Bhatghar Dam
- Location: Bhor
- Coordinates: 18.1771646°N 73.8398593°E
- Opening date: 1927
- Construction cost: 172 lakh
- Owners: Government of Maharashtra, India

Dam and spillways
- Type of dam: Solid masonry gravity dam
- Impounds: Yelwande river
- Height: 57.92 m (190.0 ft)
- Dam volume: 650 Mm^{3} (2.3×10^{22} cu ft)
- Spillway type: Automatic
- Spillway capacity: 1600cumecs

Reservoir
- Total capacity: 666 Mm^{3} (2.35×10^{22} cu ft)
- Surface area: 31.9 km^{2} (12.3 sq mi)

Power Station
- Installed capacity: 16MW

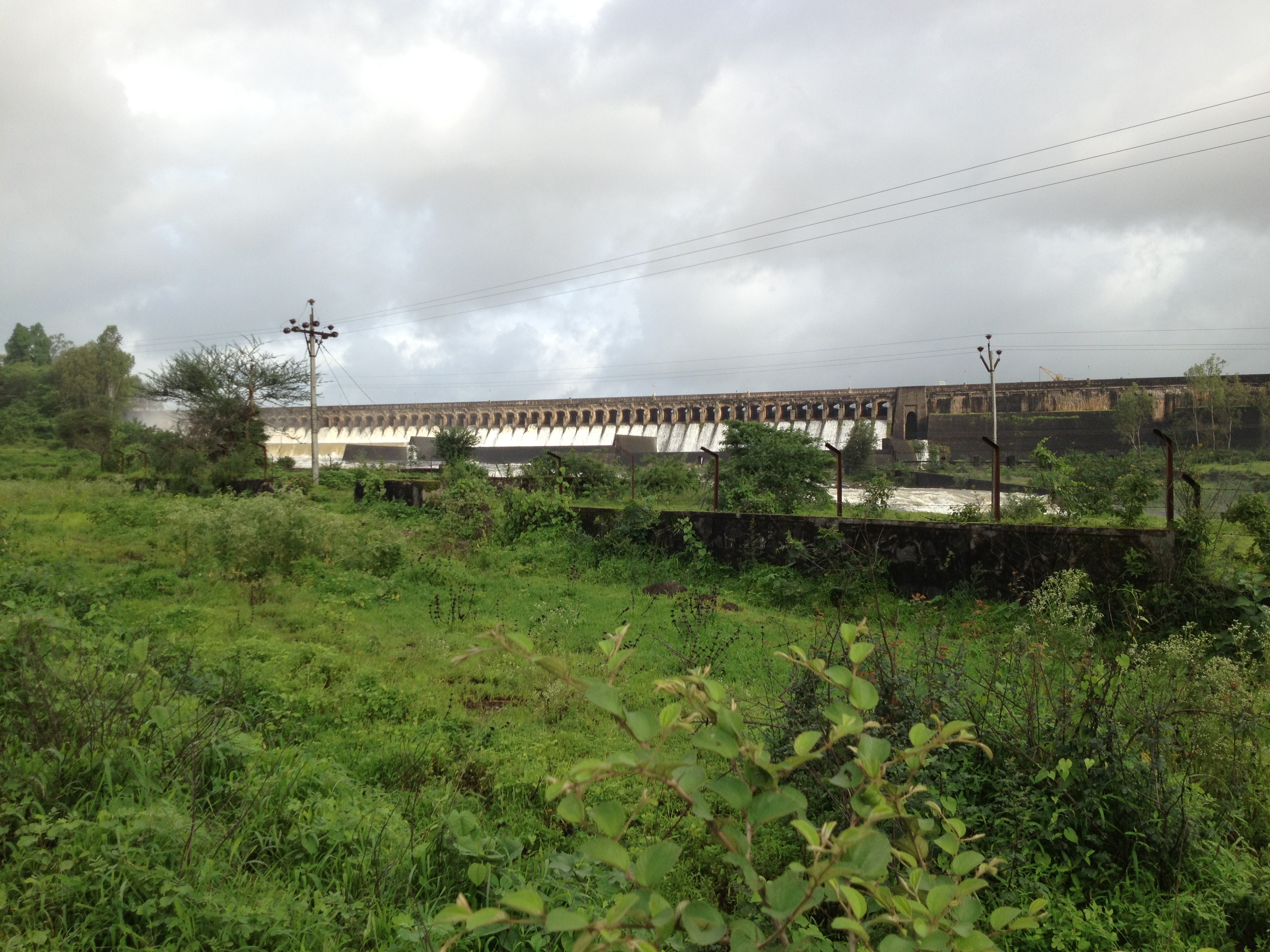

Bhatghar Dam is a gravity dam on the Velvandi (वेळवंडी) river near Bhor, in the Pune district of the state of Maharashtra in India. It is one of the oldest dams in Maharashtra constructed by the British during the time of the British Raj.

== Specifications ==
The height of the dam above the lowest foundation is 57.92 m (190.0 ft) while the length is 1,625 m (5,331 ft).The volume content is 650×10^{6} m^{3} (23×10^{9} cu ft) and gross storage capacity is 666×10^{6} m^{3} (23.5×10^{9} cu ft).

== Purpose ==
- Irrigation
- Hydroelectricity

== See also ==
- Dams in Maharashtra
- List of reservoirs and dams in India
