= Gandekar =

Maharajas of Bhor from 1699 to 1948

Pant Sachiv family (Gandekar)
- Current region: Pune, India
- Etymology: The Chief Secretary
- Origin: Gandapur Village (now extinct), near Paithan, Aurangabad District, Maharashtra, India
- Members: Shankaraji Narayan Gandekar; Naro Shankaraji Gandekar; Shankarrao Chimnajirao Gandekar; Raghunathrao Shankarrao Gandekar
- Connected families: Vinchurkar family Patwardhan family Pant Pratinidhi family
- Estate: Bhor State

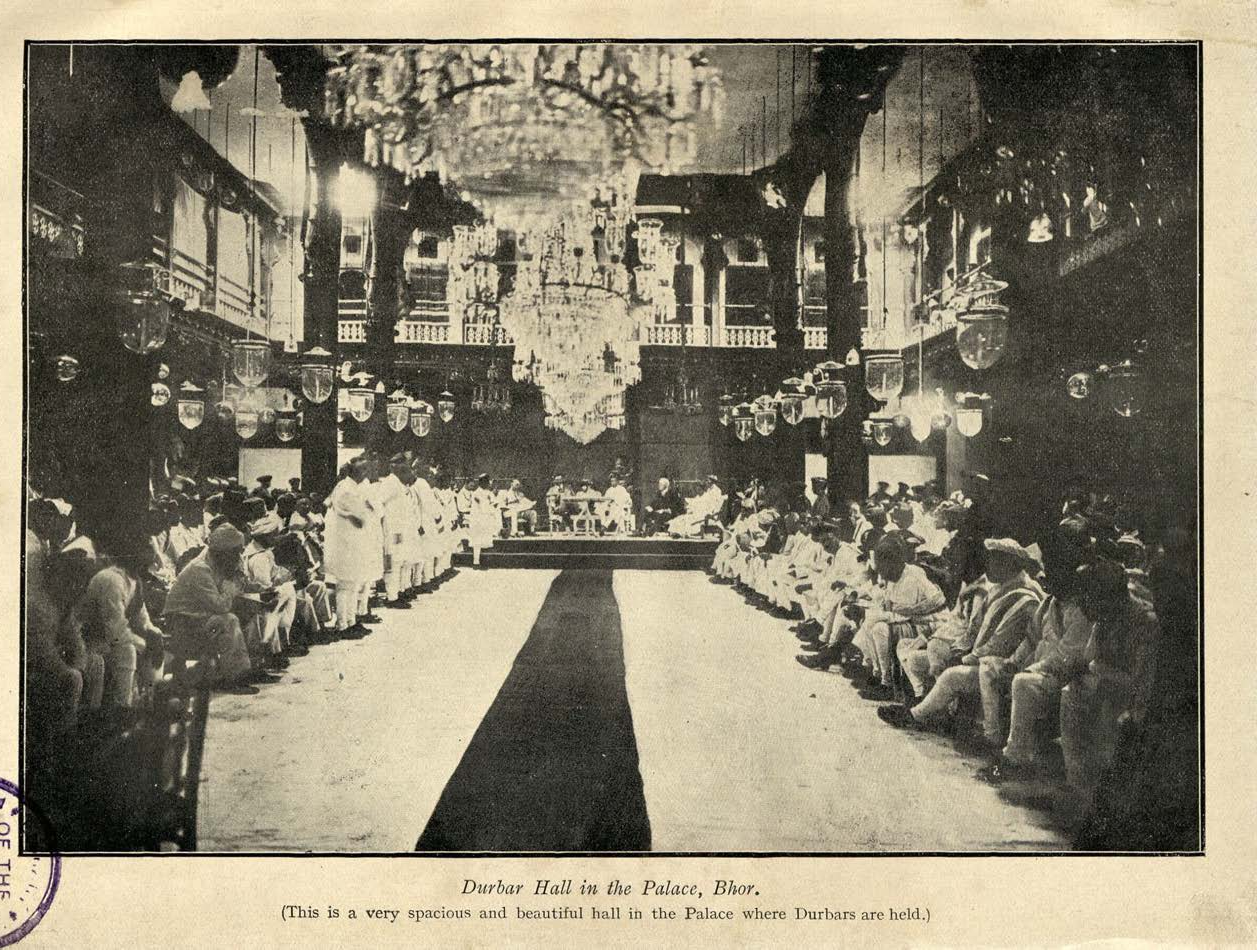
Portrait of Darbar hall, Bhor Rajwada Palace in 1920's.

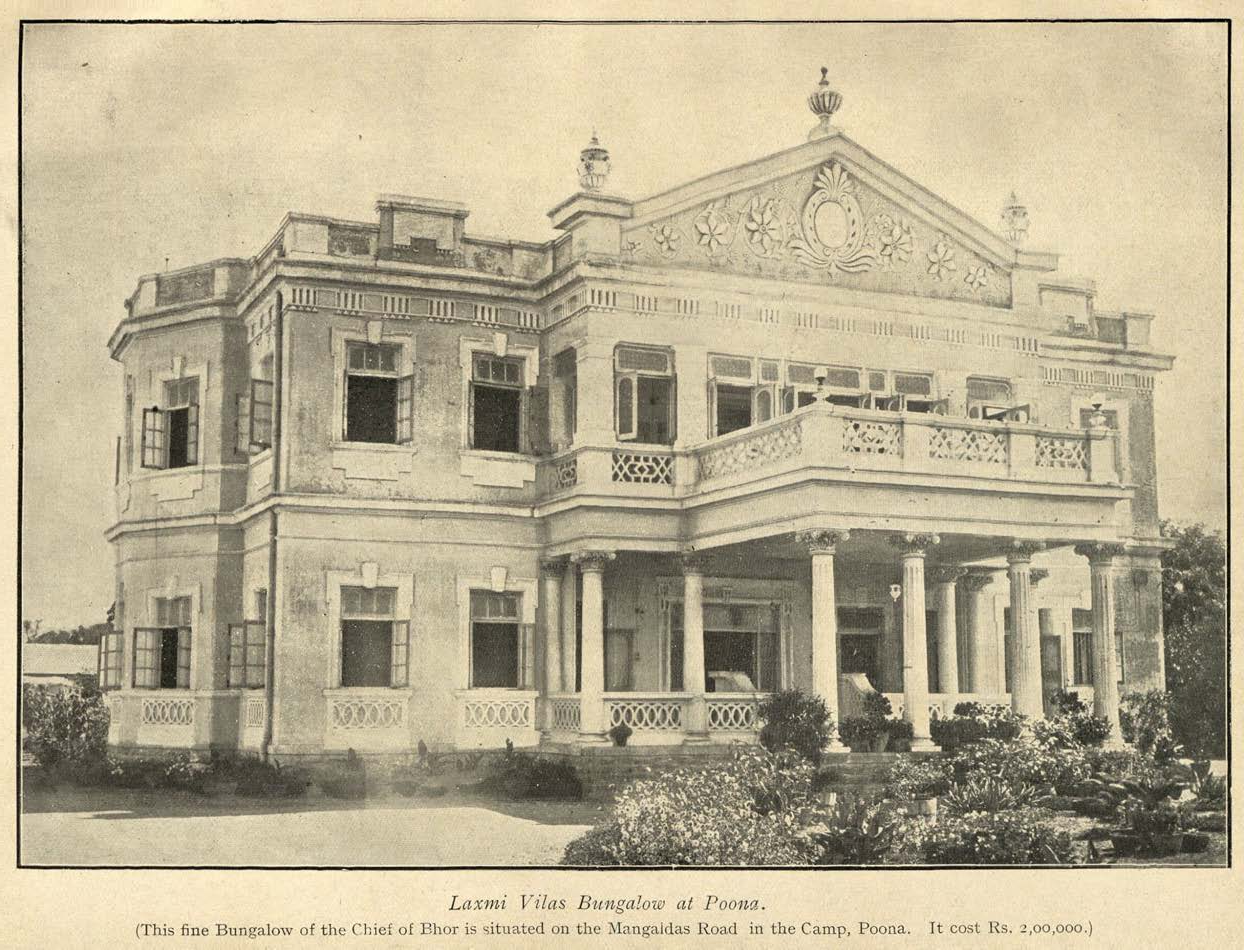
1930's Portrait of Lakshmi Vilas Palace, Pune of Gandekar Royal family.

The Gandekars (prominently known as The Pant Sachiv family) are the royal family of erstwhile Bhor State, who were rulers of the Bhor State from 1699 to 1948

Previously they served as Sachivs to Chhatrapatis of Maratha Empire and later became independent rulers of the Bhor princely state. Under the British Raj, the Pant Sachiv Family are classified as first class Sardars.In 1917 the Ruler of Bhor was granted a permanent salute of 11 guns.

== History ==
The family of the Pant Sachiv is descended from Shankaraji Narayan Pant Sachiv, who was in 1697 appointed as hereditary Pant Sachiv and was awarded an estate or jagir and other hereditary rights (watans) for his services by Rajaram I, the third Chhatrapati of the Maratha state. The family name of Pant Sachiv's is Gandekar.The Gandekars are Deshastha Rigvedi Brahmins and were residents of Gandapur, a village, (now extinct) near Paithan. The family deity of Bhor Royal family is Lord Rama.

According to C. Ovans, the estate of the Pant Sachiv family consisted of 552 villages in 1838.

== Family tree ==
=== First generation ===
- Shankaraji Narayan Gandekar (1665-1707), was the first of a series of hereditary Sachivs (Marathi for Secretary) hailing from the Marathi- Deshastha Brahmin family. Shankaraji first joined service under Pant Pradhan Moropant Pingale as an ordinary clerk. Within a few years of service, he was able to prove his high ability and valour and was appointed as Pant Sachiv by Rajaram I in 1697.

=== Second generation ===
Shankaraji Narayan married and had one son:

- Naro Shankaraji Gandekar - 2nd ruler of Bhor State.

=== Third generation ===
- Chimnajirao I Narayanrao - 3rd ruler of Bhor and nephew of Naro Shankaraji.

=== Fourth generation ===
Chimnajirao I married and had three son's:

- Sadashivrao Chimnajirao - 4th ruler of Bhor
- Anandrao Chimnajirao
- Ragunathrao Chimnajirao - 5th ruler of Bhor.

=== Fifth generation ===
Ragunathrao Chimnajirao married and had a son:

- Shankarrao I Ragunathrao - 6th ruler of Bhor.

=== Sixth generation ===
Shankarrao I Ragunathrao adopted his Father's nephew as his son:

- Chimnajirao II Shankarrao - 7th ruler of Bhor.

=== Seventh generation ===
Chimnajirao II Shankarrao had adopted his nephew as his successor:

- Ragunathrao I Chimnajirao - 8th ruler of Bhor.

=== Eighth generation ===
Ragunathrao I Chimnajirao had adopted his nephew as his successor:

- Chimnajirao III Ragunathrao - 9th ruler of Bhor.

=== Ninth generation ===
Chimnajirao III Ragunathrao married and had a son:

- Shankarrao Chimnajirao Gandekar - he was the 10th ruler of Bhor. He succeeded to the throne on 12 February 1871 as a minor. He was invested with full ruling powers on 20 July 1874 by the British Raj upon reaching maturity. The Raja was awarded with personal salute of 11 guns at the Delhi Durbar of 1911. He died on 17 July 1922.

=== Tenth generation ===
- Raghunathrao Shankarrao Gandekar - He was the 11th ruler with the title Raja of Bhor.

== Bibliography ==
- Copland, Ian (1982). The British Raj and the Indian princes: paramountcy in western India, 1857-1930. Sangam Books. ISBN 9780861312450.
- Ranade, V. G. (1930). A Short history of the Bhor State. Bhor.
