= Delhi Durbar Medal (1903) =

Delhi Durbar Medal, 1903
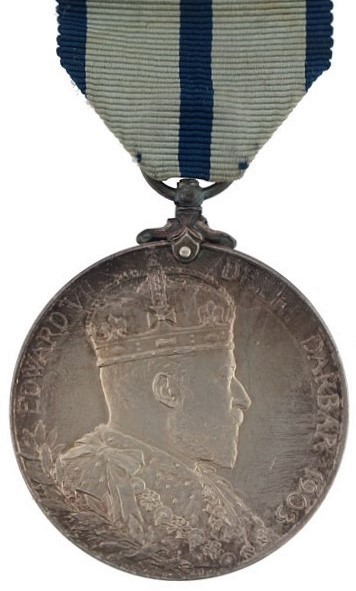
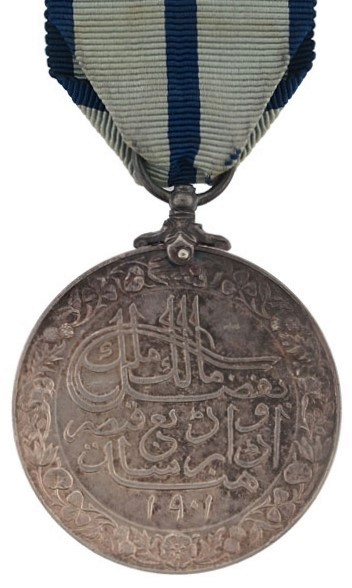
- Obverse and reverse of 1903 Durbar Medal
- Type: Commemoration medal
- Awarded for: Participation in Durbar, or broader service to the Indian Empire
- Presented by: United Kingdom and British Raj
- Established: 1903

Highlights
- Total: 140 gold and 2,567 silver medals
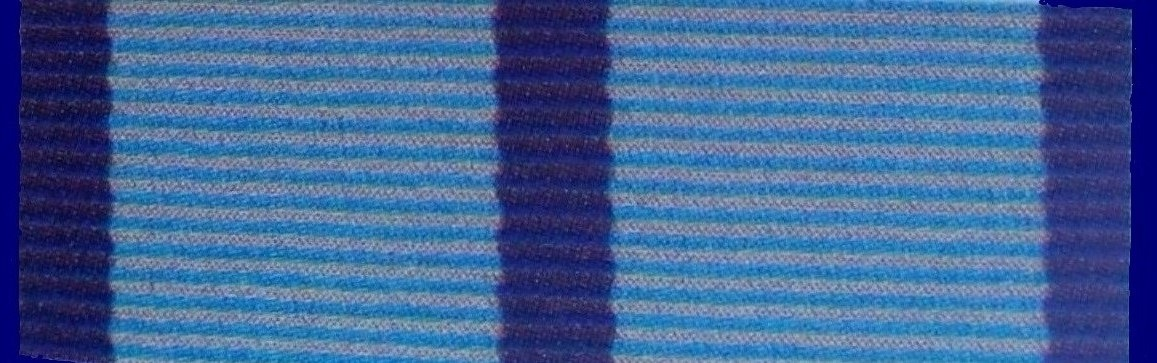
- Ribbon bar

Delhi Durbar Medals were instituted by the United Kingdom to commemorate the Delhi Durbar where the new Emperor of India was proclaimed, in 1903 for Edward VII, and in 1911 for George V. On both occasions the medals were one and a half inches in diameter and were awarded in both gold and silver. They were worn in date order alongside Coronation and Jubilee medals on the left chest, suspended from a ribbon one and a quarter inches wide. These Royal commemorative medals were worn before campaign medals until November 1918, after which the order of wear was changed, with them now worn after campaign medals and before long service awards.

== Delhi Durbar Medal, 1903 ==
Obverse: The crowned head of the king facing right wearing an ermine robe of State, with the Collar of the Garter, and Badge of the Order of the Bath. Below the bust a branch of laurel with, around the rim, the legend, EDWARD VII DELHI DURBAR 1903.
Reverse: Inset within a floral wreath of roses - a Persian inscription reading : By the Favour of the Lord of the Realm Edward, King, Emperor of India, 1901.
The medal was awarded unnamed.

140 gold medals were awarded to ruling chiefs and 2,567 in silver to other dignitaries, government officials and members of the armed forces, who were actually involved in the celebrations.

== See also ==
- Delhi Durbar Medal (1911)
- Delhi Durbar
- British colonial India
- Empress of India Medal
