= Bhor Rajwada =

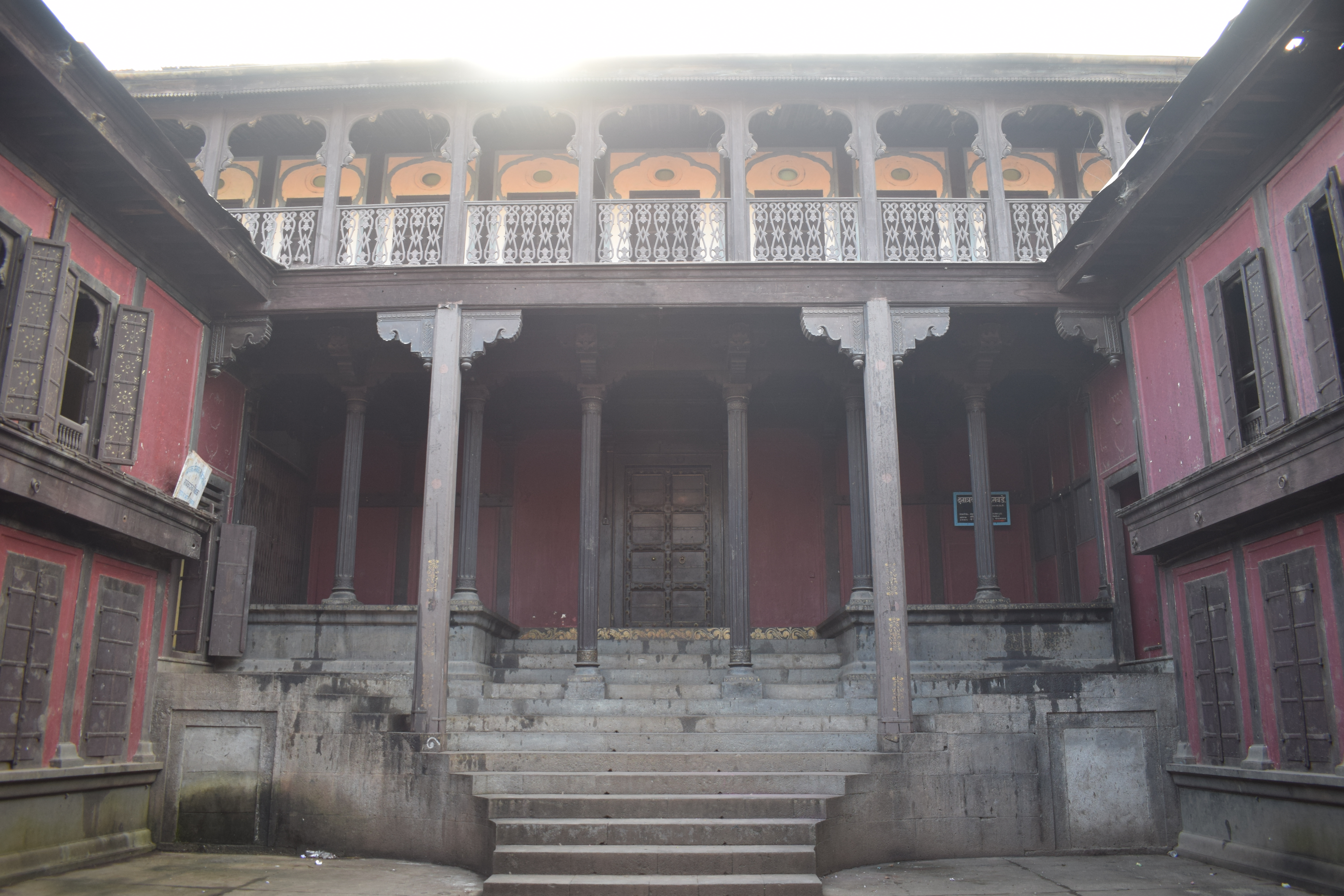
- Entrance to the Main Darbar Hall
- Interactive map of Bhor Rajwada
- Location: Bhor, Pune, Maharashtra, India

History
- Built: 1869

Site notes
- Architectural style: Synergy of Indian Vernacular

Bhor Rajwada (Marathi: भोर राजवाडा) (also known as Bhor Palace) is a historical palace and a royal residence at Bhor in the Maharashtra state of India. It was the official residence and the seat of the Rajas of the Princely State of Bhor. The Bhor Rajwada palace is a synergy of Indian Vernacular and European Renaissance Architectural style and was built by Chimnaji Rao III (ninth ruler of Bhor) at a cost of INR 2 lakh in 1869.

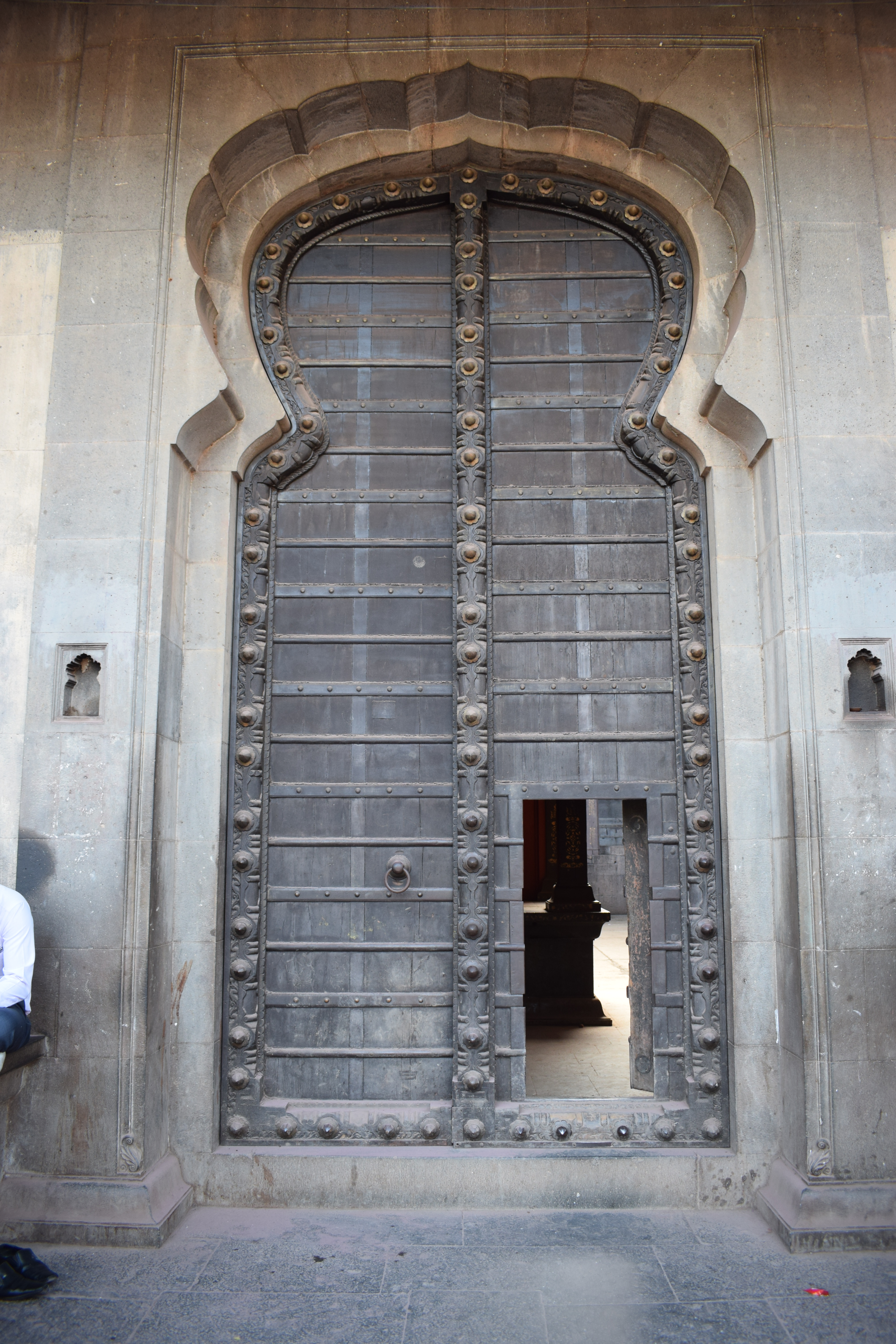
Gate of the Rajwada

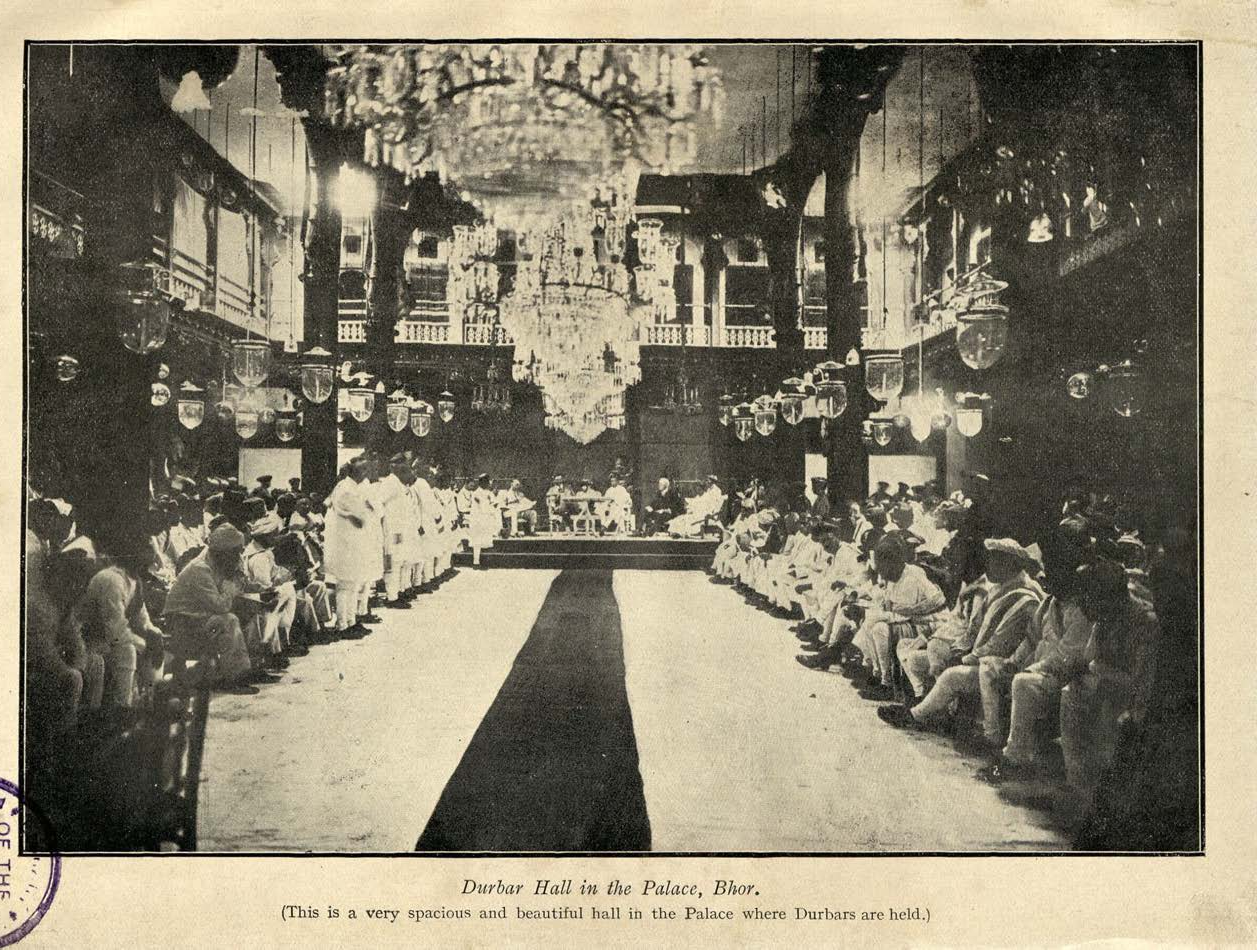
Portrait of Darbar hall of Bhor Rajwada Palace in 1920's.

== Construction ==
The last palace, now known as Old Palace or the Wooden Palace, was burnt into ashes in the year 1869 during the Ram Navami festivities. Raja Chimnaji Raghunathrao III rebuilt a new fine spacious palatial residence on the site of the Old Palace. The construction cost was Rs 2,00,000 and was completed in 1870

== Architecture ==
The architectural style of the palace is commonly described as European Renaissance Architecture with the blend of the Indian Vernacular and Gothic styles. The wada was studied in 1930's by Prof. Claude Batley, principal of Sir J. J. College of Architecture, Mumbai.

== Popular culture ==
- Bhor Rajawada was featured in the 2015 Hindi historical film Bajirao Mastani.

== Bibliography ==
- Ranade, V. G. (1930). A Short history of the Bhor State. Bhor.
