= Rohida =

Rohida Rohira Roide
- village
- Nickname: Roydu
- Location in Rajasthan, India Rohida (India)
- Coordinates: 24.610191°N 72.963982°E
- Country: India
- State: Rajasthan
- District: Sirohi

Government
  - Body: Gram Panchayat

Population (2011)
  - Total: 7,661

Languages
  - Official: Hindi
- Time zone: UTC+5:30 (IST)
- PIN: 307024
- Telephone code: 02971
- ISO 3166 code: RJ-IN
- Vehicle registration: RJ 38 (Abu Road)
- Literacy: 65.27%
- Lok Sabha constituency: Jalore - Sirohi
- Vidhan Sabha constituency: Pindwara
- Civic agency: Gram Panchayat

Rohida is a historic village situated in Sirohi district of Indian state of Rajasthan. The village is known for Audichya Rodwal Brahman Community residing there. The Maharaja of Sirohi State has provided the land to the Rodwal Brahmins. Rohida has been named after King Rohitashwa, the Son of Satayavadi Raja Harish Chandra. Rohida is the birthplace of famous historian Gaurishankar Hirachand Ojha. In 1922 Motilal Tejawat started Eki Movement to unite tribals at Rohida. The village is also known for historical temples of Sanatan community such as Somnath Mahadev, Rajrajeshwar Mahadev and Sugreeveshwar Mahadev. After independence, when Panchayati Raj established, the village elected Ravishankar Yagnik, one of freedom fighters from Rodwal community as their first Sarpanch (Head of Gram Panchayat) of the village. Who was later elected as the first Tehsil Pradhan of Pindwara Tehsil, after he represented the constituency to Rajasthan Assembly and requested for backward status for Sirohi district, which was later approved by the assembly. Here, Marwadi dialect is spoken however for official work Hindi is the preferred language. Rohida is also related to Lord Parshuram, at the period of Mahabharata, Parshuram visited Rohida and established Lord Shiva temple and named it Jabeshwar Mahadev Mandir which is around 4 km from Rohida.
