= Bhor =

- Town
- Location in Maharashtra, India
- Coordinates: 18.17°N 73.85°E
- Country: India
- State: Maharashtra
- District: Pune
- Elevation: 588 m (1,929 ft)

Population (2011)
  - Total: 18,453

Languages
  - Official: Marathi
- Time zone: UTC+5:30 (IST)
- Vehicle registration: MH-12

Bhor is a town and a municipal council in Pune district in the state of Maharashtra, India.

== Geography ==
Bhor is located at 18°10′0″N 73°51′0″E. It has an average elevation of 588 metres (1929 feet).

== Demographics ==
As of 2011 India census, Bhor had a population of 18,543. Males constitute 51% of the population and females 49%. Bhor has an average literacy rate of 78%, higher than the national average of 59.5%; with male literacy of 83% and female literacy of 73%. 12% of the population is under 6 years of age.

== Educational institutions ==
Bhor is home to a large number of educational institutes such as primary schools, high schools as well as colleges. There are number of Primary and secondary schools and colleges in the town, the Raja Raghunathrao Vidyalaya, the Shivaji Vidyalaya, and, A.T. College Bhor. Raja Raghunathrao (commonly called R.R.) Vidyalaya in Bhor is 110 years old and was built by the 11th Raja of Bhor state Raja Raghunathrao Shankarrao Pant Sachiv in 1898.

An increasing number of educational institutes providing technical education are being built near the town, such as:

- R. D. College of Pharmacy was established in Bhor in the year 1992, starting with a year-year diploma course. A degree course was started at the college in 1994, the students receive a Bachelors in Pharmacy degree from the University of Pune.
- Abhinav Education Society's College of Engineering and Technology with a three-year diploma course and 4-year degree course was established in 2006 at Wadwadi. The college gives a degree through the Maharashtra State Board of Technical Education
- Universal College of Engineering, Sasewadi, Bhor
- Navsahyadri Education Society's Group of Institutions, Naigaon, Bhor

== Transportation ==
Bhor is midway between Pune and Satara on NH 4 (Pune Satara Highway).

== History ==
Bhor was one of the princely states of British India, under the Poona political agency of the Bombay Presidency, and later the Deccan States Agency. Along with Akkalkot, Aundh, Phaltan, and Jath, it was one of the Satara Jagirs. Situated among the higher peaks of the Western Ghats, the state covered an area of 3,862 square kilometres, and had a population of 137,268 in 1901. Its Hindu rulers, of the Deshastha Brahmin caste, used the titles "Pant Sachiv" and "Raja" were entitled to a hereditary 9-gun salute. Its flag was a red swallow-tailed pennant.

== As a Filming Location ==
The temple of Bhoreshwar, dedicated to Lord Shiva and the Shiv Linga here is very old and is carved out of stone and recently modified by covering with Karpoor Kanta (2015). The temple also features a huge Nandi Idol, a Lord Veerbhadraeshwara Idol, A trishul (trident) and two small Nandi idols along with a stone cereal grinder, two stone water tubs, a Nandi mukh outlet, a stone carved tortoise, a stone idol of lord Nagdevta, a stone idol of Lord Ganesha, and stone flooring.

Narhe village near Bhatghar Dam on the banks of the Welvanda river bank is location which has been attracting many Hindi and Marathi film producers since 2005.

Films shot have been Chalte Chalte, Mangal Pandey, Khakee, Jolly LLB, Gandhi - My father, Chal Chalachal, Ramaya Vastaviya, and many Marathi TV serials like Raja Shiv Chatrapati, etc. have been shot in the local palace.

Films like Lokmanya: Ek Yugpurush a Marathi film was shot in R.R high school.

== Trivia ==
Bhor is one of the Indian cities which has a Martian crater named after it. The other cities/towns are Amet, Broach, Kakori, Poona (Pune), Rayadurg, Sandila and Wer.

== See also ==
- Bhor State
