= Gogte =

Gogte or Gogate may refer to:

== People ==
Gogte/Gogate is a surname used by Chitpavan Brahmins of the Vasishtha gotra.

- Jyoti Gogte (born 1956), Indian academic
- Mandakini Gogate (1936–2010), Indian writer
- Raosaheb Gogte (1916–2000), Indian industrialist
- Sarojini Gogte (born 1942), Indian badminton player
- Sharad Gogate (born 1936), Indian writer
- Shubhada Gogate (born 1943), Indian writer

== Other uses ==
- Gogte Institute of Technology, engineering college in Belgaum, Karnataka, India
- Gogte synthesis, in chemistry
- Globish (Gogate), artificial language
- Gogte Group, Indian conglomerate
