= Raosaheb Gogte =

Indian industrialist (1916–2000)

Founder and Managing Director of the Gogte Group
- In office 20 July 1967 – 26 February 2000

Personal details
- Born: 16 September 1916; Tembhu, Bombay Presidency, British India
- Died: 26 February 2000 (aged 83); Belgaum, Karnataka, India
- Spouse: Ushatai Chiplunkar (m. 1943)
- Children: 3
- Occupation: Industrialist, philanthropist, educationist, lawyer

Balkrishna Mahadev Gogte (IAST: Bāḷakr̥shṇa Mahādeva Gogaṭe; 16 September 1916 – 26 February 2000), known colloquially as Raosaheb Gogte (IAST: Rāvasāheba Gogaṭe), was an Indian lawyer, industrialist, philanthropist and educationist.

Gogte was the founder of the Gogte Group of companies, involved in mining, minerals, salts and textiles. He gave his name to the Gogte Institute of Technology, Gogte College of Commerce, the Gogte Hall at the Shivaji Park Gymkhana in Dadar, Mumbai, the Gogte Suite at the Oberoi Hotel in Mumbai, the Gogte Hall at the Belgaum Chamber of Commerce, and the Gogte Circle in Belgaum.

== Biography ==
=== Early life, family and education: 1916–1936 ===
Gogte was born on 16 September 1916 at Tembhu, at the time a part of the Bombay Presidency, to Dr. Mahadev Gogte (1891–1953) and Kamlabai Gogte (née Ambutai Latey). Their family was Chitpavan brahmin, and was established as the gharana at Karad since Gogte's grandfather's time. Gogte's father was a practicing surgeon in Karad, with an L. M. & S. from the National Medical College in Calcutta, while his mother hailed from the aristocratic Latey (Bhagwat) family who had been hereditary castellans of the Sadashivgad in Karad under the Peshwas since the Battle of Kharda in 1795.

Gogte was born the eldest of five children, he had two younger brothers and two younger sisters. Through his brother Vaman, Gogte was a paternal uncle to Anjali Dandekar, the first wife of Kokuyo Camlin head Dilip Dandekar, and to Jayant, husband of academician Jyoti Gogte. Through his brother Vasudev, Gogte was a paternal uncle to Rekha Agashe, the wife of BCCI vice-president Dnyaneshwar Agashe, and thus a great-uncle to Mandar, Ashutosh and Sheetal Agashe. He was also a great-uncle of poet Rashmi Parekh, the granddaughter of his brother Vasudev through his second daughter Madhuri.

Beginning in 1925, Gogte began his education at the Tilak High School in Karad, before he was sent to Jalgaon in 1926, to be educated under his paternal uncle Narayanrao Gogte, who was headmaster at the New English School there. In 1928, he accompanied his uncle to Chalisgaon, where they would be members of the Gandhi Ashram there, alongside Hari Vinayak Pataskar. In 1929, he returned to Karad to continue his education at the Tilak High School, and while there, was a classmate of Yashwantrao Chavan till 1930.

By the early 1930s, both his father and uncle had joined the Indian independence movement as Gandhians. By 1931, Gogte's father moved their family to Belgaum, where Gogte continued his education at the Chintamanrao High School at Shahapur, then in the Princely State of Sangli. While at school at Shahapur, Gogte was distinguished at elocution, was elected as general secretary of the student body, and took part in several civil unrests as part of the Indian freedom movement and was once arrested for reading out an Indian National Congress bulletin in public. In early 1932, at sixteen, he survived an assassination attempt from two students at his school, who bombed the venue of the event where Gogte and a few other students were staging Govind Ballal Deval's 1916 play Samshay Kallol.

Though of noble origin as descendants of chieftains from the Peshwai, the family was relatively impoverished, and in 1933, Gogte's father abandoned his medical practice to establish a flour mill. That same year, aged seventeen, he matriculated from school by passing his University of Bombay examinations, and went on to study law, graduating his high court pleader's examination in 1935, aged nineteen. He then moved to Mumbai to work at the Bombay High Court for a year.

While a guest at his maternal first cousin Laxman "Rajabhau" Bhave's residence in Mumbai in 1936, Gogte became acquainted with Ushatai Chiplunkar. She was the younger sister of his cousin's wife, and they were engaged shortly after their acquaintance. The couple married on 7 June 1943, and would go on to have three sons, Arvind (b. 1944), Anand (b. 1946) and Shirish (b. 1950).

=== Career as a lawyer: 1936–1943 ===
In 1936, at the age of twenty one, Gogte began his practice as an advocate in Belgaum. One of his first notable cases was that of two cutler women from Baluchistan who had been charged with cheating, criminal intimidation and affray. His defense got them acquitted, but Gogte's failure to secure the fees for his service led the women to offer him two Rampuri knives they had made as payment. This incident, alongside the moniker the two women addressed him with (Raosaheb) was widely circulated in legal circles and press, resulting in the colloquial name by which he would be known the rest of his professional and personal life.

Beginning in 1936, Gogte taught law at the Karnatak Law Society, alongside his advocacy work, and would go on to form the Belgaum District Students Conference. Around this time, Gogte was acquitted on a false charge of misappropriating sheets of irons given to him by the Iron and Steel Controller of Belgaum. When the Motor Vehicles Act was amended in 1939, he was appointed to be the Honorary Secretary of the Bus Operators' Union of Belgaum by Keshavrao Gokhale of the Bombay Legislative Assembly, where he was involved in several cases of accident insurance, route allocation, and interstate road tax negotiations with the Princely States of Sangli and Kolhapur.

During such a time, when negotiations for route allocations crossing interstate lines, between the union and the Princely States came to an impasse, Gogte was warranted for arrest by the Chief Minister of the Kolhapur State, but evaded arrest by boarding a train bound for Miraj dressed as a woman, after being informed by the private secretary of Shivaji VII, the Maharaja of Kolhapur at the time. After this incidence, the negotiations between the union and the States were formally taken up and resolved by the Deccan States Agency and the Government of Bombay.

By the end of 1942, Gogte had organised the All India Motor Union Congress and was engaged as the chief counsel for all cases between the union and the Bombay Government. By 1943, Gogte was engaged as chief counsel for cases between bus operators' unions in Belgaum, Pune, Nashik and Ahmedabad and their respective Regional Transport Authorities. He would continue to legally represent various sectors of the transport industry into the 1950s.

=== Venture into business and philanthropy: 1944–1970 ===
By 1944, Gogte had secured loans for his own trucking business. When India's involvement in the Second World War led to petrol rationing, he decided to emulate a British company in Madras, and establish a Gas-fired power plant that used charcoal to generate fuel for his trucking vehicles. This venture proved unsuccessful. In between 1945 and 1948, Gogte next ventured, yet again unsuccessfully, into setting up a Steel rolling mill in Karad.

In 1952, Gogte got involved in the business of transporting mackerel from the coasts of Karwar to inner Maharashtra and Karnataka. The need to preserve the catch, led him to seek investment from the Raja of the Princely State of Kurundwad (Junior) for the installment of an ice factory in Belgaum, which was inaugurated by Morarji Desai, then Chief Minister of Unified Bombay. On the suggestion of Bombay's Superintendent of Fisheries, Gogte travelled to Aberdeen to study flash freezing in order to set his own plant up for the venture, but was ultimately unsuccessful.

In the early 1950s, Japanese interest in the iron and manganese ores of Portuguese Goa led Gogte to explore the possibility of mining for the ores in the districts of Ratnagiri and North Kanara. In 1954, he began mining for manganese near Kuveshi, soon banding with other mine owners to form the Association of Manganese Ore Producers, of which he would serve as the inaugural president. With financial encouragement from local lenders, Gogte established the Gogte Mines company and began mining for iron ore at Redi in 1957, having leased 187 acres and 16 gunthas for the project, and producing 15,000 tonnes of iron ore within the first four months.

When contractors began demanding higher rates, he commissioned two self-propelled barges for the transport of the ore, which were inaugurated by Yashwantrao Chavan and his wife Venutai. When a flaw in their design was discovered, Gogte won the arbitration case, counselled by H. R. Gokhale, against the manufacturers of the barges. Around the same time, Gogte would also go on to assist Mohan Singh Oberoi with the foundation of his signature Oberoi hotel in Mumbai; which Gogte performed the Satyanarayan Puja for at its inauguration, and subsequently Oberoi had one of the hotel's suites named after Gogte.

Between 1959 and 1960, he further secured funding from the Bank of Baroda to import sophisticated mining equipment from the United States, having exported 92,798 tonnes of crude iron ore within that financial year. Between 1961 and 1964, the mining company continued to function at a loss, and so Gogte ventured to secure orders from Japan. In 1963, he scouted 1500 acres of land near Nala Sopara for developing a salt works. He tasked his brother Vasudev with its management, who would apply French and Tunisian techniques of salt production at the works. The Gogte Salts company was inaugurated in 1964 at the hands of Sadashiv Govind Barve. In 1966, Gogte was made a patron of the Karnatak Law Society, and the Gogte College of Commerce was named in his honour. Turning a profit after a decade of functioning, Gogte formally incorporated his mining company on 20 July 1967.

=== Veteran industrialist: 1970–1991 ===
In 1972, Gogte was elected president of the Belgaum Chamber of Commerce, and would run campaigns across rural and urban Belgaum with the chamber to attract entrepreneurs to set up small-scale industries in their localities. By 1974, Gogte had secured buyers for his iron ore in Romania, formally incorporating the Gogte Minerals company on 23 February 1977, for promotion of ammonium chloride fertilizers.

In 1977, Gogte was the subject of a festschrift, and in 1978, tried to establish a paper mill in the Chandrapur district with the help of Vasantdada Patil, but the venture was unsuccessful. Around the same time, Gogte ventured into establishing an inner-city bus service for Belgaum. The controversial scheme conflicted with the Belgaum City Corporation's plans to do the same. Gogte controversially won the license from the Regional Transport Authority for the scheme after producing a letter from then Minister of Home Affairs, Morarji Desai, disapproving of small municipalities having jurisdiction over transport services in cities. The city bus service was met with civilian acclaim, but was soon nationalised. Around the same time, he was also elected president of the Maharashtra Chamber of Commerce. In 1979, Gogte further made financial contributions to the Karnatak Law Society, who in-turn honoured him by naming the Gogte Institute of Technology after him.

On 17 May 1980, Gogte established Gogte Textiles, venturing into textiles. Under the advisement of S. M. Krishna, he pursued to obtain a license from the Government of Karnataka under Gundu Rao, to set up a textile mill in Kakti, acquiring 100 acres for the venture and ordering weaving machinery from Switzerland. After promises of financial encouragement from the Ministry of Industry fell through, Gogte appealed to R. N. Malhotra at the Reserve Bank of India for provision of working capital. Financial encouragement came from the State Bank of Mysore and IDBI, under the advisement of Shankarrao Chavan. In 1981, Gogte was elected to the first of three terms as chairman of the National Institute for Training in Industrial Engineering (NITIE), and in 1982, he became the subject of a biography in Marathi by D. K. Barve. In 1986, he was further appointed chairman of the State Industrial and Investment Corporation of Maharashtra (SICOM).

In 1980, Gogte went on to become president of the Indo-Arab Chamber of Commerce and Industry, and worked on developing the Konkan region with Saudi Arabian investment. In the late 1980s, Gogte's son Arvind, and his wife Mangal (née Patwardhan, a Princess of the Princely State of Kurundwad (Junior)), presented samples of their Textile Mills' terrycloth towels to then Prime Minister Rajiv Gandhi, whose wife Sonia Gandhi was said to have enquired after them. When Gandhi requested Gogte to arrange a visit to the mills, the mill workers went on strike. By 1990, the Gogte Textile Mills was one of the largest exporters of textile goods in Karnataka, and in 1991, Gogte became the subject of another biography by M. V. Kamath.

=== Later years, death, and legacy: 1991–2000 ===
In the early 1990s, Gogte made donations to the Belgaum Chamber of Commerce, and the chamber responded by naming the conference room at their headquarters in Belgaum the Gogte Hall, after him. Gogte served his third consecutive term as chairman of NITIE till 1994. A friend of Naval Tata, he was on the board of directors for three companies of the Tata Group, as well as a director for Oberoi hotels. He had suffered from spondylitis since 1976, having undergone successful operation for it.

A patron of the arts and sciences, he organised several concerts in Belgaum for Bal Gandharva and Lata Mangeshkar, alongside scientific patronages to the research of Bhalchandra Nilkanth Purandare. He also gave financial support to the Marathi and Kannada film industries. The Karnatak Drama Conference also honoured his patronage to drama by announcing an annual Gogte Dramatic Award awarded to dramatists.

Gogte died in Belgaum, Karnataka, on 26 February 2000, aged 83. He was survived by his wife until her own death in 2007, his three sons and their families: seven grandchildren, and two great-grandchildren at the time; his younger brother Vaman and sister Leela also survived him, as well as the descendants of all his siblings. He was survived in business by his three sons and three grandsons.

Besides the naming of the colleges founded in his honour by the Karnatak Law Society in 1966 and 1979 respectively, a bust of his likeness was installed at the headquarters of the Karnataka Education Society in 1986. Today, he is the namesake of the Gogte Hall at the Shivaji Park Gymkhana in Dadar, Mumbai, the Gogte Suite at the Oberoi Hotel in Mumbai, and the Gogte Hall at the Belgaum Chamber of Commerce. He is also the namesake of the Raosaheb Gogte College of Commerce, and the Gogte Circle in Belgaum.

== Bibliography ==
- Kamath, M. V. (1991). The Makings of a Millionaire: A Tribute to a Living Legend, Raosaheb B.M. Gogte, Industrialist, Philanthropist & Educationist. Mumbai: Jaico Publishing House. OCLC 25633742.
- Barve, D. K. (1982). सागरमेघ: बा. म. ऊर्फ रावसाहेब गोगटे यांचा भैतिक व आत्मिक आविष्कार [Sagarmegh: The Physical and Spiritual Invention of B. M. "Raosaheb" Gogte] (in Marathi). Mumbai: Bombay Book Ḍepot. OCLC 12024875.
