= Jyoti Gogte =

Indian author, entrepreneur and academic (born 1956)

- Born: Jyoti Devali-Rao; 26 May 1956 (age 70); Bijapur, Mysore State, India
- Occupations: Entrepreneur; writer; academic
- Spouse: Jayant Gogte (m. 1977; died 2020)
- Children: 2

Academic background
- Education: University of Pune (PhD)
- Thesis: Working Capital Management in the Engineering Industry In and Around Pune (1982)
- Doctoral advisor: C. G. Vaidya

Academic work
- Discipline: Economics
- Sub-discipline: Entrepreneurship
- Institutions: SNDT Women's University (1977–1979); Brihan Maharashtra College of Commerce (1979–1982); Yashwantrao Chavan Maharashtra Open University (2000–2008); University of Pune (2006–2013); Indira Gandhi National Open University (2011–2015); Symbiosis International University (2011–present)
- Notable works: Startup and New Venture Management (2014); Roadmap for an Entrepreneur (2024)

Vice Chairwoman of Jagatik Marathi Chamber of Commerce and Industries
- In office January 2009 – December 2009

Joint Managing Director of Golden Nugget Engineering & Electroplast Limited
- In office 1983–1993

President of the Association for the Promotion of Plastics
- In office 1992–1994

President of the Women's Cricket Association of India
- In office 1981–1983

Jyoti Jayant Gogte (born Jyoti Devali-Rao, on 26 May 1956) is an Indian entrepreneur and academic, most notable for her reference textbooks on entrepreneurship titled Startup & New Venture Management (2014) and Roadmap for an Entrepreneur (2024).

== Early life and family: 1956–1977 ==
Gogte was born on 26 May 1956 in Bijapur, India, to Dharnendra and Hemalata Devali-Rao (née Nadkarni). Her parents were Chitrapur Saraswat brahmins. In 1961, the family changed her official birth day to 26 March 1956 to correspond with the Indian academic year for her primary school admission.

In April 1975, Gogte graduated the University of Pune with a Bachelor of Commerce in advanced accounting and auditing, going on to finish her Master of Commerce in advanced costing and business administration from the university by May 1977. She completed a Ph.D. from the university in Finance in March 1982, writing her doctoral thesis under the guidance of Dr. C. G. Vaidya, entitled Working Capital Management in the Engineering Industry In and Around Pune.

In 1977, Gogte married Jayant Gogte, a nephew of Raosaheb Gogte, from the Gogte gharana of Belgaum. The couple has two daughters. Gogte was widowed in July 2020. By marriage, she is a relative of Dilip Dandekar and Dnyaneshwar Agashe.

== Career: 1977–present ==
From July 1977 till June 1979, Gogte was employed as a lecturer by the Shreemati Nathibai Damodar Thackeray Arts & Commerce College for Women in Pune. She went on to teach at the Brihan Maharashtra College of Commerce, from July 1979 till April 1982. From May to October 1982, she held a corporate training position with Kirloskar Consultants.

In early 1983, Gogte became president of the Women's Cricket Association of India, and was responsible for organising matches between the Sri Lankan and Australian teams against the Maharashtrian women's team. In June of that year, she was elected chairwoman of the Netball Federation of India. That same year, she ventured into business, founding the Golden Nugget Engineering & Electroplast Limited, serving as the company's joint managing director. The company manufactured plastic machine covers, and Gogte served as the company's joint managing director till 1993.

In January 1986, she interviewed S. L. Kirloskar for the MCCIA, and in 1987, Gogte founded Golden Nugget Enterprises, trading in polyethelene sheets, serving as its proprietor. That same year, she founded Creations, a company in joint venture with Camlin, developing lap trays. She would also found Gayatri Enterprises in 1987, a company that would provide logistics for Camlin, serving as its proprietor till 2005. In July 1989, she wrote for the Business Herald when Dhirubhai Ambani took Reliance Industries public.

In 1989, Gogte was honoured by the Rotary Club of Pune with their Successful Woman Entrepreneur award. That same year, she also wrote about the career of Digambar Dandekar for the Sakal Times. Between 1989 and 1990, Gogte authored a weekly column in Business Herald, entitled Stock Market Reviews. From 1992 to 1994, she served as the president of the Association of Promotion of Plastics.

From 2000 till 2008, Gogte was a Master of Philosophy guide for the Yashwantrao Chavan Maharashtra Open University. In September 2001, Gogte went on to found Focus Foundation, a charitable trust, through which she would provide training programs for educational institutes in Pune, most notably hosting APJ Abdul Kalam in November 2002. Around the same time, she was the recipient of the Udyog Chakra award from the Mahratta Chamber of Commerce, Industries and Agriculture.

In 2006, she was made a professor and director of the University of Pune, a position she would hold till 2013. That same year, she was a professor and director at the Sinhgad Institute of Business Management & Research, a position she held till 2007. In 2009, Gogte served as the vice chairwoman of the Jagatik Marathi Chamber of Commerce and Industries in Pune. That same year, she became a professor and director at the Institute of Management & Research, going on to serve Trinity Institute of Management & Research from 2010 to 2011, Modern Institute of Business Management from 2011 to 2012, and the Research Institute of Health Science Management from 2012 to 2013, in that same role.

From 2011 to 2015, she was a visiting professor at the Indira Gandhi National Open University, and since 2011, has been a visiting professor at the Symbiosis International University. Since 2012, Gogte has served as a Ph.D. guide for the University of Pune. In 2014, she authored her first reference textbook titled Startup & New Venture Management, which was published by Vishwakarma Publications. In 2015, her paper presented at the Global Science & Technology Forum in Singapore was named the Best Research Paper at the conference. Since 2016, she has been a professor and research guide at Vishwakarma Institute of Management & Research. In 2024, Vishwakarma Publications published her second reference textbook titled Roadmap for an Entrepreneur.

== Selected works ==
- Startup & New Venture Management. Pune: Vishwakarma Publications. June 2014. ISBN 978-93-83572-03-8. OCLC 1023538065.
- Roadmap for an Entrepreneur. Pune: Vishwakarma Publications. April 2024. ISBN 978-9395481557.

== Bibliography ==
- "Belgav Gharana, Dusra" [The 2nd House of Belgaum]. Gogte Kulavruttanta [The Gogte Family Genealogy Almanac] (in Marathi). Pune: Gogte Committee. 2006.
- Barve, D. K. (1982). सागरमेघ: बा. म. ऊर्फ रावसाहेब गोगटे यांचा भैतिक व आत्मिक आविष्कार [Sagarmegh: The Physical and Spiritual Invention of B. M. "Raosaheb" Gogte] (in Marathi). Mumbai: Bombay Book Ḍepot. OCLC 12024875.
- Kamath, M. V. (1991). The Makings of a Millionaire: A Tribute to a Living Legend, Raosaheb B.M. Gogte, Industrialist, Philanthropist & Educationist. Mumbai: Jaico Publishing House. OCLC 25633742.
