= Belagavi City Corporation =

Local government of Belagavi

Belagavi City Corporation Beḷagāvi Mahānagara Pālike

Type
- Type: Municipal Corporation
- Established: 1 December 1851; 174 years ago

Leadership
- Mayor: Preeti Vinayak Kamkar, BJP since 18 March 2026
- Deputy Mayor: Hanumanth Kongali, BJP since 18 March 2026
- Municipal Commissioner: Kartik M, (KAS)

Structure
- Seats: 58
- Political groups: Government (35): BJP (35); Opposition (11): INC (10); AIMIM (1); Others (12): IND (05); MES (07)

Elections
- Voting system: First past the post
- Last election: September 2021
- Next election: 2026

Meeting place
- Belagavi, Karnataka

Website
- BCC

Belagavi City Corporation (BCC) is the municipal governing body of the city of Belagavi (Belgaum) in the Indian state of Karnataka. The municipal corporation consists of democratically elected members, is headed by a mayor and administers the city's infrastructure and administration. Municipal Corporation mechanism in India was introduced during British Rule with formation of municipal corporation in Madras (Chennai) in 1688, later followed by municipal corporations in Bombay (Mumbai) and Calcutta (Kolkata) by 1762. Belagavi Mahanagara Palike is headed by Mayor of city and governed by Commissioner.

== History ==
It was established as Belgaum city Municipal Corporation Committee on 1 December 1851. It had a population of 23,115 and was having an income of 35,460 in 1851. It was the first City Corporation that was established in Bombay Karnataka. Later, many other municipal corporations were established like Nippani in 1854 and subsequently, many other municipalities were established under Bombay District Municipalities Act of 1901. The City Corporation elections were fought on the linguistic basis before 2022.

== List of Corporators ==
Wards Share
1. INC (17.2%)
2. BJP (60.4%)
3. Independent (13.8%)
4. MES (6.90%)
5. AIMIM (1.71%)

Councilors by Party
| Ward No. | Winner | Party | Reservation Category |
|---|---|---|---|
| 1 | Iqra Mulla | Independent | |
| 2 | Muzamil Doni | Congress | |
| 3 | Jyoti Kadolkar | Congress | |
| 4 | Jayterth Saundatti | BJP | |
| 5 | Afriza Mulla | Congress | |
| 6 | Santosh Pednekar | BJP | |
| 7 | Shankar Patil | Independent | |
| 8 | Sohail Sangoli | Congress | |
| 9 | Puja Patil | Independent | |
| 10 | Vaishali Bhatkande | Independent | |
| 11 | Samiulla Madiwale | Congress | |
| 12 | Madinsahab Matwale | Independent | |
| 13 | Reshma Bhairakdar | Congress | |
| 14 | Shivaji Mandolkar | Independent | |
| 15 | Netravati | BJP | |
| 16 | Raju Bhatkande | BJP | |
| 17 | Savita Kamble | BJP | |
| 18 | Sahidkhan Pathan | AIMIM | |
| 19 | Riyaz Killedar | Independent | |
| 20 | Shakela Mulla | Congress | |
| 21 | Priti Kamkar | BJP | |
| 22 | Raviraj Sambrekar | BJP | |
| 23 | Jayant Jadhav | BJP | |
| 24 | Girish Dhongadi | BJP | |
| 25 | Zarina Fatekhan | Independent | |
| 26 | Rekha Hugar | BJP | |
| 27 | Ravi Salunkhe | Independent | |
| 28 | Ravi Dhotre | BJP | |
| 29 | Nitin Jadhav | BJP | |
| 30 | Nandu Mirajkar | BJP | |
| 31 | Veena Vijapure | BJP | |
| 32 | Sandeep J | BJP | |
| 33 | Reshma Patil | BJP | |
| 34 | Shreyas Nakadi | BJP | |
| 35 | Laxmi Rathod | BJP | |
| 36 | Rajshekar Doni | BJP | |
| 37 | Shamobin Pathan | Congress | |
| 38 | Mohd Patwegar | Independent | |
| 39 | Udaykumar Upari | BJP | |
| 40 | Reshma Kamkar | BJP | |
| 41 | Mangesh Pawar | BJP | |
| 42 | Abhjijeet Jawalkar | BJP | |
| 43 | Vani Joshi | BJP | |
| 44 | Anand chavan | BJP | |
| 45 | Rupa chikaldani | BJP | |
| 46 | Hanmant Kongali | BJP | |
| 47 | Asmita Patil | Independent | |
| 48 | Basavraj Modgekar | Independent | |
| 49 | Deepali Topagi | BJP | |
| 50 | Sarika Patil | BJP | |
| 51 | Shrishail Kamble | BJP | |
| 52 | Khurshia Mulla | Congress | |
| 53 | Ramesh Maligol | BJP | |
| 54 | Madhavi Raghoche | BJP | |
| 55 | Savita Patil | BJP | |
| 56 | Laxmi Lokari | Congress | |
| 57 | Shobha Somnache | BJP | |
| 58 | Priya Satgoud | BJP | |

== Mayor ==
Mayor's post is reserved for General category and Deputy Mayor's Post was limited to General Woman.

== Functions ==
Belagavi City Corporation is created for the following functions:

- Planning for the town including its surroundings which are covered under its Department's Urban Planning Authority .
- Approving construction of new buildings and authorising use of land for various purposes.
- Improvement of the town's economic and Social status.
- Arrangements of water supply towards commercial, residential and industrial purposes.
- Planning for fire contingencies through Fire Service Departments.
- Creation of solid waste management, public health system and sanitary services.
- Working for the development of ecological aspect like development of Urban Forestry and making guidelines for environmental protection.
- Working for the development of weaker sections of the society like mentally and physically handicapped, old age and gender biased people.
- Making efforts for improvement of slums and poverty removal in the town.

== Revenue sources ==
The following are the Income sources for the Corporation from the Central and State Government.

=== Revenue from taxes ===
Following is the Tax related revenue for the corporation.

- Property tax.
- Profession tax.
- Entertainment tax.
- Grants from Central and State Government like Goods and Services Tax.
- Advertisement tax.

=== Revenue from non-tax sources ===
Following is the Non Tax related revenue for the corporation.

- Water usage charges.
- Fees from Documentation services.
- Rent received from municipal property.
- Funds from municipal bonds.

== Proposed Expansion ==
In June 2023, the Public works department minister Satish Jarkiholi instructed the city corporation to start working on merging the villages attached to the city. The plan is to increase the number of city corporation wards up to 90 from 58.

The following town/villages will be merged into city corporation.

- Bastawad
- Modaga
- Hindalaga
- Macche
- Halaga
- Sambra
- Peeranwadi
- Dhamane
- Kakati
- Honaga
- Bennali
