= Dilip Dandekar =

Indian businessman

President of Indian Merchants' Chamber

Personal details
- Spouses: Anjali Gogte (till 1993; her death); Smita Karandikar (m. 1998)
- Children: 3; 1 stepdaughter
- Parent: Digambar P Dandekar (father)
- Relatives: Dnyaneshwar Agashe (cousin-in-law)
- Occupation: Chairman, managing director

Dilip Dandekar is the chairman and managing director of Kokuyo Camlin Ltd., taking office from June 1, 2002. He joined Camlin Ltd. as a management trainee under his father, D. P. Dandekar and uncle, G. P. Dandekar, who were the founders of the company (initially known as Dandekar and Co.).

He currently serves as the President of Indian Merchants' Chambers. Also, he is presently the chairman of Camlin Fine Sciences.

== Early life ==
Dilip Dandekar was born the son of Digambar Dandekar, co-founder of Camlin Ltd. and member of the entrepreneurial and aristocratic Dandekar family. Dandekar's uncle, G. P. Dandekar was the other co-founder of the company. Dandekar has one older brother, Subhash who served as executive chairman of Camlin until his retirement in 2002.

He was married to Anjali Dandekar (née Gogte; niece of Balkrishna "Raosaheb" Gogte), and they had 3 children together; before her death in 1993. His wife was a sister-in-law to Jyoti Gogte.

He later remarried Smita Dandekar (née Soman) in 1998. She has one daughter from her previous marriage.

== Career ==
Dilip Dandekar joined Camlin Ltd. as management trainee and became executive director of the company in 1979. He took charge as chairman and managing director from June 1, 2002. This was following the retirement of his brother, Subhash Dandekar, from the post of Executive Chairman after a period of 43 years. Dandekar served as a Vice President of Indian Merchants' Chambers and now serves as the Non Executive Chairman of Camlin Fine Sciences Ltd. (formerly, Camlin Fine Chemicals Ltd) and has been its Director since June 2006. Dandekar served as a Joint Managing Director of Kokuyo Camlin Limited. from June 1, 2002 to February 1, 2013.

He has served as the chairman of Camlin Limited since June 1, 2002. Under him, in May 2011, Kokuyo S&T Company Ltd, a wholly owned subsidiary of Japan's Kokuyo Company Ltd acquired a controlling stake in Camlin Ltd from the Dandekar family. The name of the company was changed to Kokuyo Camlin Ltd.

Dilip Dandekar also serves as director to companies Indo Schottle Auto Parts Pvt. Ltd., Nilmac Packaging Industries Ltd. and Camlin International Ltd. He is a member of the executive committee of the Federation of Indian Chamber of Commerce and Industry, is the President of Indian Merchants’ Chamber and on the governing board of Bombay First and the ICFAI Business School.

He is also on the Board of Datamatics Global Services as an Independent Director.
