= Chemical industry in India =

The chemical industry of India is a major industry in the Indian economy and as of 2022, contributes 7% of the country's Gross Domestic Product (GDP). India is the world's sixth largest producer of chemicals and the third largest in Asia, as of 2022. The value of the Indian chemical industry was estimated at $100 billion dollars in 2019. The chemical industry of India generates employment for five million people. The Indian chemical industry produces 80,000 different chemical products. India was also the third largest producer of plastic in 2019. As of September 2019, the alkali chemical industry produced 71% of all chemicals produced in India. India's chemical industry accounts about 14% of production in Indian industries.

== Introduction ==
The Indian chemical industry mainly produces basic types of chemicals as well as knowledge type chemicals and specialty type chemicals as of 2018. In India, Gujarat was the largest state contributor to the chemical industry of India in 2018. India also produces products related to petrochemicals, fertilizers, paints, varnishes, glass, perfumes, toiletries, pharmaceuticals, etc.

== Production ==
The chemicals industry in India is very diversified and can essentially be classified into 6 categories: bulk chemicals, specialty chemicals, agrochemicals, petrochemicals, polymers and fertilisers.

=== Basic organic chemicals ===
The organic chemicals industry is one of the most significant sectors of the chemical industry in the world. It plays a vital role in providing inputs for other industries of paints, adhesives, pharmaceuticals, dyestuffs and intermediates, leather chemicals, pesticides, etc. Methanol, acetic acid, formaldehyde, pyridine, phenol, alkylamines, ethyl acetate, and acetic anhydride are major basic organic chemicals that are produced in India. Six major chemicals are produced in India: methanol, aniline, alkylamines, and its derivatives formaldehyde, acetic acid, and phenol contributing to nearly 2/3 of Indian basic organic chemical industry. The country has several basic organic chemical companies that are among the largest companies globally in their chemical productions. These companies include:

- Balaji Amines. The worlds largest producer of Dimethylamine hydrochloride.

=== Inorganic chemicals ===
==== Chlor-alkali chemicals ====
In India, chlor-alkali the sector mainly consists of the production of three inorganic chemicals; caustic soda (NaOH), chlorine (Cl_{2}) and soda ash (Na_{2}CO_{3}). Hydrogen is also produced in this industry in small amounts. The chlor-alkali industry inputs are mainly used in soaps and detergents, pulp and paper, textiles, aluminium processing industry for caustic soda and for soda ash in glass, silicate production etc apart from soaps and detergents. In the financial year 2019–2020 of chlor-alkali industry of India over four million metric tons of alkali chemicals were produced. The products that are produced in this industry are soda ash, caustic soda, and liquid chlorine. Tata Chemicals, a diversified Indian chemicals company, is also the world's third largest manufacturer of soda ash.

=== Speciality chemicals ===
As of December 2021, the speciality chemicals segment comprised 22% of India's overall chemicals market. In 2019, India's share of the global speciality chemicals market stood at 4%, however India's market share is projected to stand at 5.5% by 2025. India has several niche specialty chemical companies that are among the largest companies globally in their specific niche sectors. These companies include:

- Camlin Fine Sciences. The world's third largest manufacturer of vanillin.
- Clean Science and Technology. The world's third largest producer of guaiacol.
- Tatva Chintan. The world's second largest manufacturer of structure directing agents for zeolites.
