= Gharli =

- Village
- Country: India
- State: Karnataka
- District: Belgaum
- Talukas: Khanapur

Languages
  - Official: Kannada
- Time zone: UTC+5:30 (IST)

Gharli is a village in Belgaum district in the southern state of Karnataka, India. The Gharli local language is Kannada. The Gharli Village total population is 371 and the number of houses is 83. The female population is 49.1%, the village male literacy rate is 70.1% and the female literacy rate is 28.6%. BJP and INC are the major political parties in this area. Gharli is home to the Gogte Institute of Technology.
