= Gogte Group =

Indian conglomerate

- Type: Private
- Industry: Conglomerate
- Founded: 1957; 69 years ago
- Founder: Raosaheb Gogte
- Headquarters: Belgaum, Karnataka, India
- Subsidiaries: Gogte Mines; Gogte Salts; Gogte Minerals; Gogte Textiles

Gogte Group is an Indian conglomerate, headquartered in Belgaum, Karnataka, involved in mining, minerals, salts and textiles. The conglomerate was founded by Raosaheb Gogte, beginning in 1957.

== History ==
=== Gogte Mines ===
In the early 1950s, Japanese interest in the iron and manganese ores of Portuguese Goa led Raosaheb Gogte, a lawyer at the time, to explore the possibility of mining for the ores in the districts of Ratnagiri and North Kanara. In 1954, he began mining for manganese near Kuveshi. With financial encouragement from local lenders, Gogte established the Gogte Mines company and began mining for iron ore at Redi in 1957, having leased 187 acres and 16 gunthas for the project, and producing 15,000 tonnes of iron ore within the first four months.

In 1962, the company came under scandal when one of its mines collapsed, injuring several workers. When contractors began demanding higher rates, he commissioned two self-propelled barges for the transport of the ore, which were inaugurated by Yashwantrao Chavan and his wife. Turning a profit after a decade of functioning, Gogte formally incorporated his mining company on July 20, 1967.

By 1972, the company was exporting iron and manganese ore to Europe and the Middle East. By 1973, the company was considered one of the leading exporters of iron ore in Maharashtra, with their mine in Redi, being cited as the principal producer.

=== Gogte Salts ===
In 1963, Gogte scouted 1500 acres of land near Nala Sopara for developing a salt works. He tasked his brother Vasudev with its management, who would apply French and Tunisian techniques of salt production at the works. The Gogte Salts company was inaugurated in 1964 at the hands of Sadashiv Govind Barve, after Gogte's brother Vaman, dealt with lengthy legal proceedings to obtain letters of intent from the government for the company to go into commercial production in Maharashtra. Negotiations concluded, after the company acquiesced to manufacture both edible and industrial salt for which the government would allot 2,000 acres of land to the company. In July 1964, the Government of Maharashtra gave the company licenses to manufacture soda ash and ammonium chloride.

=== Gogte Minerals ===
By 1974, Gogte had secured buyers for the company's iron ore in Romania, formally incorporating the Gogte Minerals company on February 23, 1977, for promotion of ammonium chloride fertilizers. As of 2020, the company's research in the use of the minerals it mines, as well as the company's export practices have been cited by several government and educational institutions studying the field.

=== Gogte Textiles ===
On May 17, 1980, Gogte established Gogte Textiles, venturing into textiles, manufacturing cotton yarns and fabrics. Under the advisement of S. M. Krishna, he pursued to obtain a license from the Government of Karnataka under Gundu Rao, to set up a textile mill in Kakti, acquiring 100 acres for the venture, and ordering weaving machinery from Switzerland. After promises of financial encouragement from the Ministry of Industry fell through, Gogte appealed to R. N. Malhotra at the Reserve Bank of India for provision of working capital. Financial encouragement came from the State Bank of Mysore and IDBI, under the advisement of Shankarrao Chavan.

In the late 1980s, Gogte's son Arvind, and his wife presented samples of their Textile Mills' terrycloth towels to then Prime Minister Rajiv Gandhi, when they learned that his wife Sonia Gandhi had enquired after them. When Gandhi requested Gogte to arrange a visit to the mills, the mills' workers went on strike. By 1990, the Gogte Textile Mills was one of the largest exporters of textile goods in Karnataka.
