= M. V. Chandgadkar =

Indian cricket administrator

Madhukar Vinayak Chandgadkar,
- Born: 5 August 1920; Belgaum
- Died: 8 June 1984 (aged 63); Bombay
- Occupation: cricket administrator

Madhukar Vinayak Chandgadkar, usually known as Prof. M. V. Chandgadkar (born in Belgaum 5 August 1920 - died in Bombay, 8 June 1984), was an Indian cricket administrator and secretary of the Board of Control for Cricket in India (BCCI).

Chandgadkar studied in the Rajaram College, Kolhapur and Wadia College, Pune. He played as a right arm fast bowler for Wadia where he did his M. A. He was a Professor of English at the R. A. Podar College, Bombay from 1944 till 1980.

Chandgadkar was the secretary of BCCI from 1970-71 to 1974-75, joint secretary between 1968–69 and 1969–70 and executive secretary from 1980-81 to 1983-84. He was the joint secretary of Bombay Cricket Association between 1962–63 and 1978–79, and the vice president in the next year. He played an important part in the construction of the Wankhede Stadium and the library in the Garware Pavilion at the ground is named after him. MCC awarded him a life membership in 1978. Chandgadkar was also the president of the India cricket umpires association. He died from a heart attack.

He was single minded in attracting and developing people into Podar College. In cricket, some students were Dilip Vengsarkar, Ravi Shastri and Sanjay Manjrekar. In the sport of water polo, he attracted Vivek Abhyankar, who went to represent India and win a medial.
