= Workers Development Union =

Workers Development Union Shramik Abhivrudhi Sangh
- Abbreviation: SAS
- Location(s): 20. Milkman Street, Camp Belgaum, Karnataka, India
- Region served: North Karnataka & Kolhapur
- Also called: Jana Jagran (Awake)
- Director: Joseph Chenakala
- Affiliations: Goa Province of Jesuits; Catholic church
- Staff: 42
- Website: SAS

Workers Development Union (Shramik Abhivrudhi Sangh) also known as Jana Jagran is the social action wing and a non government organization of the Goa Jesuits, with activities concentrated in Belgaum and other districts of north Karnataka and in the Kolhapur district of Maharashtra.

The Union has a shepherd training program in sheep care, modern medicines and modern breeding practices carried on in the largely pastoral northern districts of Karnataka. In 1996 SAS helped local women produce and market handbags and other handicrafts made of jute and cotton fibre. In 2005 SAS teamed with the Swiss Agency for Development and Cooperation and helped Kuruba women in the Belgaum district in Karnataka to make and market wool products from sheep on the Deccan Plateau.
