= Halaga =

- Village
- Location in Karnataka, India Halaga (India)
- Coordinates: 15.88°N 74.56°E
- Country: India
- State: Karnataka
- District: Belgaum
- Talukas: Belgaum

Population (2001)
  - Total: 6,450

Languages
  - Official: Kannada
- Time zone: UTC+5:30 (IST)
- ISO 3166 code: IN-KA

Halaga is a village in the southern state of Karnataka, India. It is located in the Belgaum taluk of Belgaum district in Karnataka.

== Demographics ==
At the 2001 India census, Halaga had a population of 6450 with 3294 males and 3156 females.

== See also ==
- Belgaum
- Districts of Karnataka
