= Dandekar =

Dandekar is a surname from the Indian state of Mahrashtra. It is toponymic in nature and found amongst various communities like Brahmins, Sonars, Tambats, and Bene Israelis. Notable people with the surname include:

- Anusha Dandekar, Indo-Australian MTV VJ, actress and singer
- Dilip Dandekar, chairman and managing director of Kokuyo Camlin Ltd.
- Gopal Nilkanth Dandekar (1916–1998), Indian Marathi language writer
- Kala Dandekar, fictional character, Sense8 TV series
- Morobhatt Dandekar (fl. 1830s), Hindu apologist from Bombay, India
- Ramchandra Narayan Dandekar (1909–2001), Indian Vedic scholar
- Shankar Vaman Dandekar (1896–1969), Indian philosopher
- Shibani Dandekar, an Indian singer, actress, anchor and model
- Swati Dandekar, American politician
