= Hindustan Pencils =

Indian stationery manufacturer

- Industry: Stationery
- Founded: 1958; 68 years ago
- Headquarters: Mumbai, India
- Area served: Worldwide
- Products: Pencils; Office products
- Website: www.hindustanpencils.com

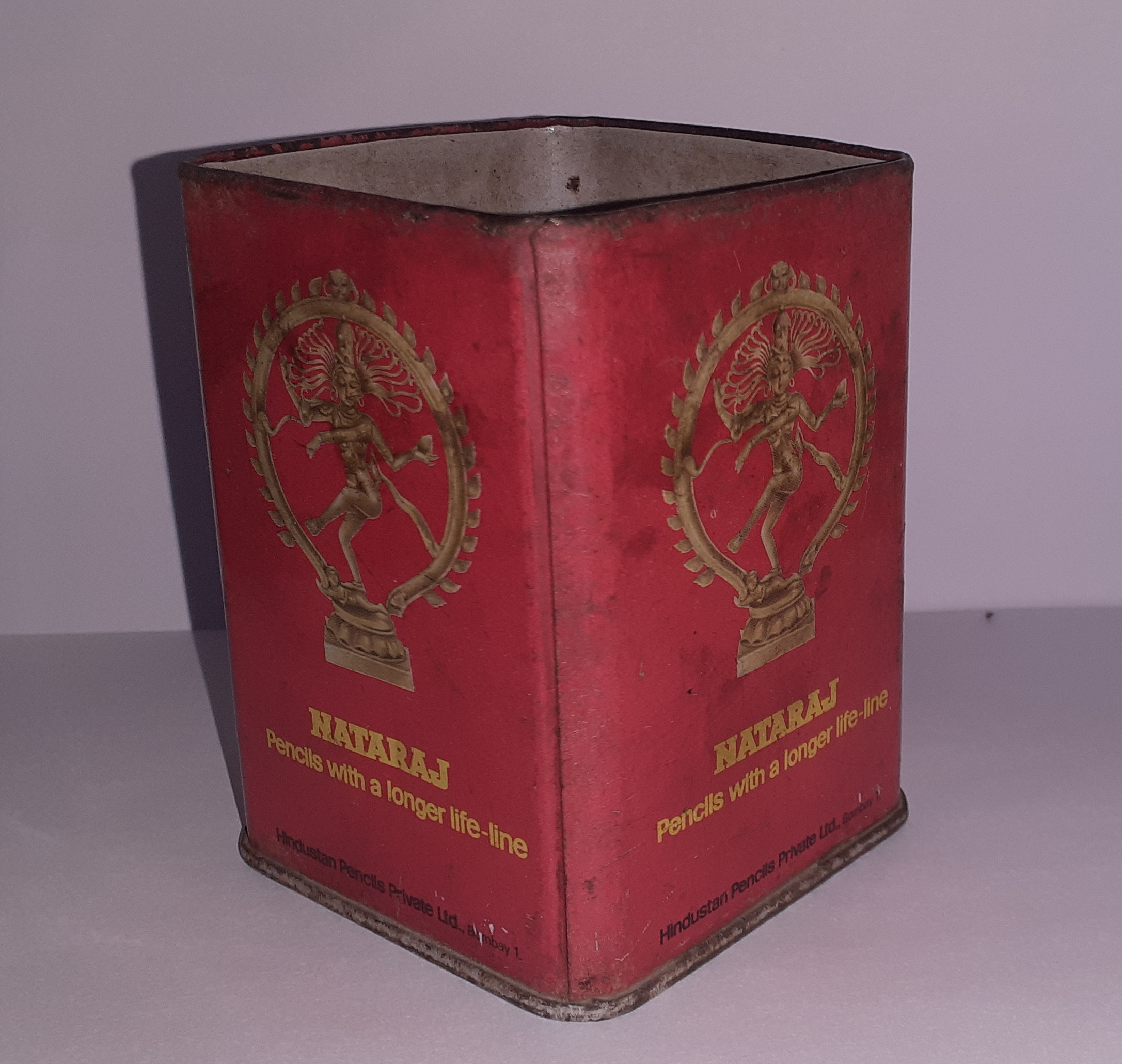
Nataraj pencil metal container in the 1990's

Hindustan Pencils Pvt. Ltd. is an Indian manufacturer of pencils, writing materials and other stationery items, established in 1958 in Bombay (present-day Mumbai). The company makes writing implements under the brands Nataraj and Apsara, and claims to be the largest pencil manufacturer in India.

== History ==
The company was started in 1958 by friends B. J. Sanghvi (fondly called as Babubhai), Ramnath Mehra and Mansookani. It is now one of the most well known pencil manufacturing companies in India and it manufactures writing instruments; primarily wood-cased pencils, sharpeners, erasers and pens under the Nataraj and Apsara brands. Hindustan Pencils is a market leader with a 45% market share and is the largest manufacturer in India, making over 8.5 million pencils a day. It currently has a presence in over 50 countries.

It also produces a line of coloured pencils under the Colorama brand. In 2013, a law student in Bengaluru filed a consumer complaint against the company over its coloured pencils, claiming that the "skin" colour was lighter than his own skin colour, and that the company's preference for the lighter "skin" colour promoted "racist ideas" (or colourism). The "skin" coloured pencil was also the subject of a campaign by anti-discrimination activist group Brown n' Proud.

== Products ==
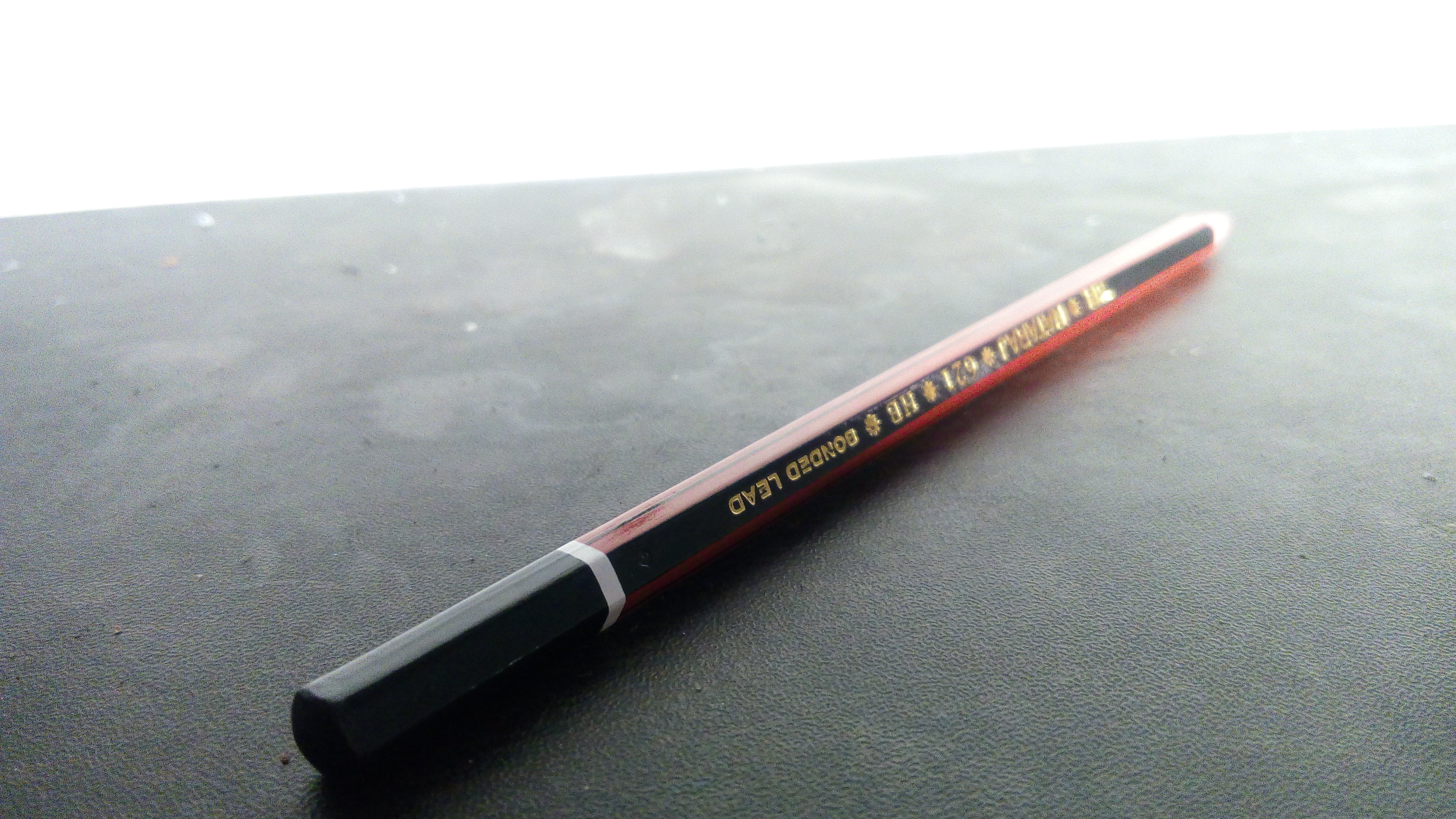
Nataraj 621 HB graphite pencil

Hindustan Pencils' products include: 621, Bold, Marble (pencils) and Dust Clear (eraser) under the Nataraj brand; Platinum, Absolute (pencils) and Long Point (pencil sharpener) under the Apsara brand. The range of products is as follows:

Type	Products
Writing implements	pencils, mechanical pencils, ballpoint pens
Art materials	colored pencils, crayons
Others	Erasers, sharpeners, rulers

== See also ==
- Kokuyo Camlin
