= Honaga =

Village in Karnataka, India

- Village
- Location in Karnataka, India Honaga (India)
- Coordinates: 15.88°N 74.56°E
- Country: India
- State: Karnataka
- District: Belgaum
- Talukas: Belgaum

Population (2001)
  - Total: 6,803

Languages
  - Official: Kannada
- Time zone: UTC+5:30 (IST)

Honaga is a village in the southern state of Karnataka, India. It is located in the Belgaum taluk of Belgaum district in Karnataka.

== Demographics ==
As of 2001 India census, Honaga had a population of 6803 with 3411 males and 3392 females.

== See also ==
- Belgaum
- Districts of Karnataka
