= Camlin Fine Sciences =

Indian chemicals manufacturer

Camlin Fine Sciences Ltd.
- Type: Public
- Traded as: NSE: CAMLINFINE; BSE: 532834
- Industry: Speciality chemicals
- Founded: 1931
- Headquarters: Mumbai, Maharashtra, India
- Area served: South Asia, Mexico and Central America
- Key people: Ashish Subhash Dandekar (Managing Director)
- Website: www.camlinfs.com

Camlin Fine Sciences originated as part of the Camlin group, an Indian manufacturer of stationery and art materials. The company subsequently expanded into the specialty chemicals sector, focusing on antioxidant ingredients and related chemical products. During the 2000s and 2010s, the company expanded its international operations through acquisitions and investments in overseas manufacturing facilities.

These activities increased the company's presence in Europe and Latin America and broadened its product portfolio. In 2015, Camlin Fine Sciences acquired a controlling interest in Dresen Química, a Brazilian manufacturer of food preservation and shelf-life extension products, expanding its operations in South America. The company later entered the aroma chemicals and vanillin production sectors through investments in manufacturing facilities and related businesses.

Company manufactures chemicals to improve the shelf life of food and other products like aromatic compounds, and performance chemicals. CFS has emerged as the largest producer of food antioxidants such as tert-Butylhydroquinone (TBHQ) and Butylated hydroxyanisole (BHA). It is also one of the world's leading Vanillin producers.

CFS has offices and manufacturing facilities in several countries, such as India, China, Italy, Brazil, Mexico and the United States. Having established global leadership in antioxidants, CFS expanded their business with forward integrated into antioxidant blends and has widened its application to the food and beverage industry, pet food, animal feed, fishmeal, aquaculture, biodiesel, etc.

Camlin Fine Sciences holds the patent for an improved process in the synthesis of BHA Butylated hydroxyanisole from TBHQ tert-Butylhydroquinone

== History ==
In 1984, Camlin Fine Chemicals Division was started by Camlin with the setting up of a new ultra-modern plant at Tarapur, India. In 2006, Camlin Fine Chemicals demerged from the parent company, and an entirely new entity was formed called Camlin Fine Sciences Ltd. In 2007, CFS was listed on the Bombay Stock Exchange. In 2011, CFS got listed on the National Stock Exchange of India. In 2011, CFS took the firm overseas with the acquisition of Borregaard Italia SpA, a hydroquinone and catechol manufacturing facility at Ravenna, Italy through its wholly owned subsidiary in Mauritius. In 2014, CFS began operations in Brazil through its 100% subsidiary company CFS do Brasil Ltd, where it commenced production of antioxidant blends for food applications.

In 2016, CFS acquired 65% stake in Dresen Quimica S.A.P.I.de C.V., Mexico, along with its group companies and subsidiaries.

In July 2017, CFS became the 3rd largest producer of vanillin in the world with the acquisition of 51% stake in Ningbo Wanglong Flavors & Fragrances Company Ltd., China. In November 2017, CFS entered into a preferred supply agreement with Lockheed Martin Advanced Energy Storage for the manufacturing and supply of a specialty chemical. In April 2018, CFS entered into an Animal Nutrition joint venture with Pahang Pharma (S) Pte. Ltd., Singapore.

In 2018, Camlin Fine Sciences entered into a joint venture with Pahang Pharma (S) Pte. Ltd., Singapore, through the formation of CFS Pahang, to expand its presence in the animal nutrition sector.

In 2020 The company completed a greenfield expansion project at Dahej Special Economic Zone in Gujarat and commenced commercial production at its diphenol manufacturing facility. The expansion increased the company's manufacturing capacity for hydroquinone- and catechol-based chemical products used in industrial and specialty chemical applications.

== Business verticals ==
=== Shelf life solutions ===
Having established global leadership in antioxidants, CFS moved forward in blending by setting up a unit in Tarapur, India and in Brazil in 2014. Today, CFS has its blending facilities across the world (India, China, Mexico, USA and Brazil). It has a portfolio of more than 100 natural shelf-life extending products under the brand names Xtendra and NaSure. The company has widened its applications for different food industries such as snacks, bakery, meat & poultry, spices & seasonings, etc., and has also tapped potential shelf life solutions in fried snacks, pet food, fishmeal, biodiesel, confectionery, animal feed.

CFS acquired a 65% stake in Dresen Quimica S.A.P.I. de C.V., Mexico, to cover Central America and Andean States. Dresen is in the Mexican food and feed blends business. With this acquisition, the portfolio expanded to geographies in Mexico and Central America with products like antioxidant blends (traditional and natural), feed additives, etc.

=== Aroma ingredients ===
CFS produces vanillin and ethyl vanillin using fully traceable, vertically integrated production. CFS uses an environmentally friendly method for producing vanillin and ethyl vanillin (sold under the brand names Vanesse and Evanil, respectively) from Catechol. The company makes all key ingredients in-house and has gained acceptance as a quality global vanillin player. The brands Vanesse (vanillin) and Evanil (ethyl vanillin) have grown their customer base not only from the food and flavor industry, but also manufacturers of fragrances, incense sticks, and pharmaceuticals industries and perfumeries.

The company has also launched floral booster, which is specially developed for the incense stick industry to enhance sweet note, sustain burning, and aroma-spreading properties along with Intense Green-a fragrance and flavour chemical, and Vetigreen-an aromatic chemical for home cleaning solutions, personal care products, cosmetics, and incense sticks.

=== Performance chemicals ===
The company entered into the performance chemicals segment with the acquisition of Borregaard Italia Spa Ltd in March 2011 and became one of the largest producers of di-phenols (Hydroquinone and Catechol). To cater the demand from the market CFS has doubled its guaiacol capacity to 4000 tonnes per annum and raised veratrole capacity by 67% to 1000 tonnes per annum in FY16 and this will lead to 17% sales CAGR over FY15-18 to Rs 2.04bn. CFS has distribution hubs in different parts of the world to cater to customer demands.
