= Shubhada Gogate =

Marathi writer

- Born: 2 September 1943; Nasik
- Died: 24 January 2026; Pune
- Education: B.Sc. (Chem)
- Occupation: Writer
- Spouse: Sharad Gogate

Shubhada Sharad Gogate, born 2 September 1943 as Pushpa Ranade, is a Marathi author from Maharashtra, India.

== Biography ==
Shubhada Gogate is the daughter of Dinkar Damodar Ranade and Sarojini Dinkar Ranade of Nasik. As a child, she was a voracious reader of Marathi- and English-language books, magazines and circulars, and wrote many short stories. She completed her B.Sc. in chemistry in Nasik in 1962 and worked as a school teacher for a few years.

She married Sharad Gogate in 1966, who was in the book-selling field and later published books. As a bookseller and publisher’s wife with a keen interest in her husband’s work, she soon learned the trade of making and selling books.

Gogate began writing professionally in 1981 and her first novel Yantrayani (Marathi: यन्त्रायणी) was published in 1983. It was published first in two parts in the monthly magazine Naval, then later in book form. This novel went on to win the government of Maharashtra’s award for best novel in the science-fiction category.

Gogate's novel Khandalyachya Ghatasaathi (Marathi: खन्डाळ्याच्या घाटासाठी), a historical novel based on the construction and then extension of the first railway line in India, was published in 1992. This was a very different genre her previous work, involving a great deal of research into the historical information. It went on to win the Best Novel award from Marathi Sahitya Parishad as well as the Mrinmayi puraskar given by the well-known Marathi writer G.N. Dandekar.

In 1993, Gogate's story "Birthright" was included in the science fiction anthology It Happened Tomorrow, published by the National Book Trust of India. The book included 19 stories that were translated into English from various Indian languages.

Shubhada Gogate died peacefully at home, on 24 January 2026.

== Noteworthy works ==
=== Science fiction ===
- Yantrayani (Novel)
- Marginals (Collection of short stories)
- Vasudeve Nela Krushna (Collection of short stories)
- Asmani (Collection of short stories)

=== Historical Novels ===
- Khandalyachya Ghatasaathi - based on first railway line in India
- Sandha Badaltana – based on the first railway line in a princely state in India – Badoda.

=== Paranormal ===
- Ghar (Collection of short stories)

=== Non Fiction works ===
- Hriday vikar Nivaran
- Niramay Yashasathi Dhyaan
