= Vishwakarma University =

- Type: State Private University
- Established: 3 May 2017 (9 years ago)
- Endowment: Bansilal Ramnath Agarwal Charitable Trust (BRACT)
- Location: Pune , Maharashtra, India
- Website: Official website

Vishwakarma University is located in Pune, Maharashtra, India.

== History ==
The Vishwakarma University was established on 3 May 2017 as a State Private University by the Government of Maharashtra. The university enjoys an autonomy in designing its own curriculum, teaching methods, examination system and awarding degrees as per the provisions of Vishwakarma University Act 2017. The academic programs commenced from June 2017.

== Campus ==
Vishwakarma University has a campus located in Kondwa, suburbs of Pune city in Maharashtra, India. It is 10 km from Pune station and 17 km from Pune airport.

== Organisation ==
The Vishwakarma University is a natural offshoot of the Vishwakarma Group's educational legacy spanning 35 years. The Group functions under the framework of Bansilal Ramnath Agarwal Charitable Trust(BRACT). The Trust runs several educational institutes, a publishing division, retail stores, a managing consultancy and a temple under its aegis.

The first educational venture of the trust - Vishwakarma Institute of Technology (VIT) was established in the year 1983. Vishwakarma Vidyalaya was established in the year 1986, followed by a series of educational institutes in the subsequent years. Presently, the Vishwakarma Group has 1500 full-time employees, 17 educational institutes that have programmes ranging from high school, junior school, undergraduate, postgraduate to Phd. Programmes, in the fields of engineering, law, management, marine engineering, and value added programmes with approximately 17,000 student enrollments.

== Departments/ Centers ==
=== Art and Design - ===
- Department of Fashion and Apparel
- Department of Graphic and Multimedia
- Department of Interior Design and Decoration
- Department of Fashion Design and Apparel Technology
- Department of Graphic Design and Multimedia Technology
- Department of Interior Design and Decoration Technology

=== Science and Technology - ===
- Department of Mechanical Engineering
- Department of Computer Engineering
- Department of Artificial Intelligence and Data Sciences

=== Centre for Professional Excellence in Engineering - ===
- Centre for Professional Excellence 4.0
- Department of Mathematics and Statistics
- Department of Basic Science
- Department of Biotech and Bioinformatics
- Department of Computer Science
- Department of Health and Wellness

=== Commerce and Management - ===
- Department of Management

=== Interdisciplinary Studies - ===
- Department of Vocational Education
- Department of Professional Education

=== Humanities and Social Science - ===
- Department of Psychology
- Department of Economics
- Department of Public Administration
- Department of Foreign Languages
- Department of Philosophy and Culture
- Department of Liberal Arts
- Department of Travel and Tourism

=== Journalism and Mass Communication - ===
- Department of Media, Communication and Journalism

=== Law - ===
- Department of Law and Governance

== Associations ==
- IBM
- TATA Technologies
- Korean Institute of Science and Technology
- State University of New York, Binghamton, U.S.A.
- National University, U.S.A.
- The University of Ngaoundere, Cameroon
- Wufeng University, Taiwan
- University of Ontario, Canada
- Hof University of Applied Sciences, Germany
- Energy Research Institute @ NTU, Singapore
- Unity Engine
- School of Integrated Innovation, Chulalongkorn University, Thailand

== Achievements ==
Vishwakarma University was awarded the best Innovations Award by ACMA-LIONS at Innovations Expo 2017.

Vishwakarma University won award for best guitarist in Firodiya karandak 2022.

== Extra-Curricular ==
Activities like photography, literary readings and sports are an integral part of the life at Vishwakarma University campus. The university has a vibrant photography club, a book club, an adventure club, a fine arts club, cultural club, an Ethical and Social Responsibility club (ECR) and a sports club to bring out the non-academic potentials of students to the fore.
