= Tembhu =

Village in Maharashtra

- village
- Interactive map of Tembhu
- Country: India
- State: Maharashtra
- District: Satara

Languages
  - Official: Marathi
- Time zone: UTC+5:30 (IST)

Tembhu is a small village situated on the eastern bank of the River Krishna, near Karad, in the Satara District of Maharashtra, India. Tembhu is the site of an Rs 9-billion irrigation project, set up in order to provide water to the drought-stricken Satara district. A recent report by a government committee has looked into the project and decided that it is un-viable, citing, among other reasons, "unusually high" project costs.

It is the birthplace of famous "samajsudharak" Mr. Gopal Ganesh Agarkar (Freedom Fighter) who played important role in political and social aspects of Maharashtra before independence. That era is also known as "tilak-agarkar" era.

Now Tembhu LIS project is costing Rs. 26 billion. The project is likely to be declared as National Project

On 10 August 2009, while testing the rising main an accident occurred; injuring 7 people and causing one death. On 19 March 2025 A girl from Karad city lost her life after she accidentally fell into the dam.Later her dead body was recovered in Khambale village of Kadegaon Taluka.
