= Sharad Gogate =

Marathi writer

Sharad Prabhakar Gogate
- Born: 27 June 1936; Bhusawal
- Occupation: Publisher, Publishing expert, Writer
- Education: M.A., LL.B.
- Spouse: Shubhada Gogate

Sharad Gogate, born Sharadchandra Prabhakar Gogate on 27 June 1936, is a Marathi publisher and writer from Maharashtra, India.

== Biography ==
Sharad Gogate is the son of Prabhakar Gopal Gogate and Sumati Prabhakar Gogate of Bhusawal. His father and both his grandfathers were practicing lawyers, and his initial goal was to follow them into a law career. He went to Pune for his education in 1953, attending Fergusson College and ILS Law College. After he earned his L.L.B., he considered practicing in the Mumbai High Court but after working at a large book shop called Deccan Book Stall in Deccan Gymkhana, Pune, his love of books led him to become a bookseller instead. In 1968 Gogate opened his own book shop called Saraswat (Marathi: सारस्वत). He started a publishing company in 1975 called Shubhada Saraswat (Marathi: शुभदा – सारस्वत).

In 1966, Gogate married Pushpa Ranade (Shubhada Gogate) of Nasik, who later became a well-known Marathi author.

== Notable works published by Shubhada Saraswat ==
=== Important reference works ===
- Marathi–English Dictionary by Moleswarth
- English-Marathi Dictionary by N. B. Ranade
- Vyutpatti Kosh (व्युत्पत्तिकोश) by K.P. Kulkarni
- Gomantak: Prakruti Ani Sanskruti (3 Volumes) by B. D. Satoskar
- Bharatiya Tatwadnyanacha Bruhad Itihaas (12 Volumes) by G. N. Joshi

=== Other award-winning publications ===
- Khandalyachya Ghatasaathi by Shubhada Gogate
- Aaranyak by Milind Vatwe
- Sanskrit Va Prakrit Bhasha by Madhav Deshpande

=== Other notable publications ===
Yes, I am Guilty! (1983) by Munawwar Shah

== Beyond publishing ==
In 2001, Sharad Gogate retired from active book publishing and turned to writing about the profession. His most notable writing is Marathi GranthPrakashanachi 200 Varshe (Marathi: मराठी ग्रन्थप्रकाशनाची 200 वर्षे), a comprehensive study of the first 200 years of Marathi publishing from 1805 to 2005. This seminal work consolidates a great deal of detailed information that was obtained only through extensive research through vast volumes of material.

Gogate has been a guest lecturer at various courses and workshops on publishing conducted by the University of Pune as well as other well-known educational institutes.
