= Mandakini Gogate =

Indian writer

Mandakini Kamalakar Gogate (16 May 1936 – 15 January 2010) was a Marathi writer from Maharashtra, India.

She was born on 16 May 1936, in Mumbai, and received her bachelor's degree from SNDT Women's University. She also had a G. D. Art degree.

== Literary works ==
The following is a list of Gogate's literary work:

=== Collections of short stories ===
- सवत माझी लाडकी (Sawat Majhi Ladaki) (1994)
- प्रेमाच्या होड्या (Premachya Hodya) (1995)
- स्वप्नातली परी (Swapnatali Pari)
- ढळता दिवस (Dhalata Diwas)
- गंध मातीचा (Gandha Maticha)
- मुंबईच्या रंगीबेरंगी मुली (Mumbaichya Rangi Berangi Muli)

=== Novels ===
- ह्या कातर उत्तररात्री (Hya Katar Uttar Ratri) (1996)
- गागी (Gagi)
- रसिक बलमा (Rasilk Balama)

=== Travelogues ===
- त्या फुलांच्या सुंदर प्रदेशात (Tya Phulanchya Sundar Pradeshat) (1995)
- आमचीपण सिंदबादची सफर (Amachi Pan Sindabadchi Saphar) (1995)
- जांबो जांबो ग्वाना (Jambo Jambo Gwana) (Tanzania safari)

=== Other works ===
- छानदार कथा भाग १ व २ (Chhandar Katha) (Children's literature)
- बोले तैशी चाले (Bole Taishi Chale) (One-act play)
- प्रेमा पुरव : क्रांतिकारी अन्नपूर्णा (Prema Purav : Krantikari Annapurna) (Biography)
- महंमद घोरीची सांगली (Mahammad Ghorichi Sangali) (Science fiction) (1996)
- चिमाजीअप्पाची मिशी (Chimaji Appachi Mishi) (Essays)
- सर्पांची अजब दुनिया (Sarpanchi Ajab Duniya) (Nature)
