= Gogte Institute of Technology =

Engineering college in Belgaum, Karnataka, India

Coordinates: 15°48′53.72″N 74°29′13.91″E

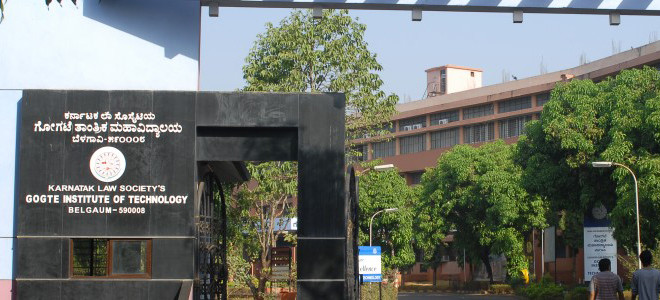
- Motto: Where Thoughts Meet Reality
- Type: private
- Established: 1979
- Academic affiliations: Autonomous under Visvesvaraya Technological University
- President: n&v
- Administrative staff: 300+
- Undergraduates: 2,800
- Postgraduates: 240
- Location: Belgaum, Karnataka, India
- Campus: 28 acres (110,000 m^{2})
- Website: www.git.edu

Gogte Institute of Technology (GIT) is a college in Belgaum, Karnataka, India. It is an Autonomous institution affiliated to Visvesvaraya Technological University.

== History ==
The college was founded in 1979 to meet the growing demand for technically trained workers, being named after industrialist Raosaheb Gogte. It received the Excellent Technical Education Institute in Karnataka award at the 9 August 2014 National Karnataka Education Summit and Awards at Visvesvaraya Technological University in Bangalore.

Indian President Ram Nath Kovind inaugurated the platinum jubilee of Belgaum-based Karnataka Law Society and Raja Lakhmagouda Law College on 15 September 2018, and addressed a gathering at the institute. Karnataka Governor Vajubhai Vala, Chief Justice Dipak Mishra, Chief Minister H. D. Kumaraswamy, Supreme Court Judges Abdul Nazeer, Vineet Saran, Mohan Shantan Goudar, Attorney General K.K. Venugopal, MP Suresh Angadi, Karnataka Law Society president Anant Mandagi, and Chairman M. R. Kulkarni were also present.

== Alumni ==
- Atul Chitnis, German born Indian consulting technologist and organizer of FOSS.in
