= Gunta =

Unit of area

The gunta or guntha is a measure of area used in the Indian subcontinent, predominantly used in some South Asian countries. This unit is typically used to measure the size of a piece of land.

== In India ==
- 1 anna = 7.5624 square yards = 6.3232 square metres
- 1 gunta = 120.999 square yards = 101.1714 square metres = 16 annas
- 1 guntha (R) = 33 ft (10 m) × 33 ft (10 m) = 1,089 sq ft (101.2 m^{2})
- 40 gunthas = 1.0 acre
- 4 acre = 1 fg

== In Pakistan ==
Other units were used alongside Imperial measures

- 1 anna = 20.16 sq yd
- 6 anna = 1 guntha = 120 square yard
- 4 guntha = 1 jareeb = 484 square yard
- 4 jareeb = 1 kanee = 1936 square yard
- 10 jareeb = 1 acre = 4840 square yard
- 25 acres = 1 marabba

== See also ==
- Conversion of units
- Acre-foot
- Acre
- Acre (Scots)
- Hectare
