= D. P. Dandekar =

Indian sociologist and entrepreneur

Digambar Parashuram Dandekar
- Born: 27 December 1907
- Died: 11 October 1994 (aged 86)
- Occupation: Entrepreneur
- Notable work: Founder of Kokuyo Camlin

Digambar Parashuram Dandekar (27 December 1907 – 11 October 1994) was an Indian sociologist and entrepreneur, best known for his research on population trends in Chicago and Northwestern Indiana, his autobiography A Travel on Camel (1977), and for co-founding the Camlin stationery company in 1931 with his brother.
