= Kokuyo Camlin =

Indian stationery company

Kokuyo Camlin Ltd.
- Formerly: Dandekar & Co. Camlin Ltd.
- Type: Public
- Traded as: BSE: 523207; NSE: KOKUYOCMLN
- Industry: Stationery
- Founded: 1931; 95 years ago
- Fate: Agreement with Kokuyo Co. Ltd. of Japan to share profits (2012)
- Headquarters: Mumbai, India
- Area served: South Asia
- Key people: Dilip Dandekar (Chairman)
- Products: Art materials, writing implements, office products
- Brands: Camel
- Number of employees: 1095 (in 2023)
- Website: kokuyocamlin.com

Kokuyo Co., Ltd.
- Formerly: Kuroda Kokkodo Co., Ltd.
- Type: Kabushiki gaisha
- Industry: Stationery (primary), Office furniture, video games (former)
- Founded: 1905; 121 years ago
- Founder: Zentaro Kuroda
- Headquarters: Osaka, Japan
- Area served: Asia, North America
- Key people: Hidekuni Kuroda (President)
- Products: Stationery, office products, office furniture
- Number of employees: 6825 (Dec 2021)
- Website: kokuyo.com

Kokuyo Camlin Ltd., is an Indian stationery manufacturing company based in Mumbai. The company shares profits with Kokuyo of Japan, which holds around 51% stake in Kokuyo Camlin.

The company sells products related to art materials, writing implements and office goods.

== History ==
Camlin was established in 1931 by D. P. Dandekar and his brother G. P. Dandekar starting operations as "Dandekar & Co." with "Horse Brand" Ink powders and tablets in 1931, and shortly started producing "Camel ink" for fountain pens. It was incorporated as a private company in 1946, and then turned into a public limited company in 1998.

In 2011, Japanese stationery major, "Kokuyo Co. Ltd", acquired a 50.74% stake in Camlin for ₹366 crore. Dilip Dandekar continued as chairman and managing director of the company. The deal facilitated the entry of Kokuyo products, mainly paper and office stationery into the Indian market, while Camlin aimed to increase its exports to other countries.

== Kokuyo Japan ==
Kokuyo Co., Ltd. (コクヨ株式会社, Kokuyo Kabushiki Gaisha) is a Japanese manufacturing company of stationery, office furniture, and office equipment. Kokuyo was established in Japan, in 1905 by Zentaro Kuroda, as "Kuroda Ledger Cover Shop" that made covers for Japanese-style account ledgers (wacho). In 1914, the company name changed to Kuroda Kokkodo, and the manufacture of accounting slips, invoices, duplicate copybooks, and letter paper began. The company began using the current name "Kokuyo Co., Ltd." in 1961.

In May 2011, Kokuyo S&T Co., Ltd., a wholly owned subsidiary of Kokuyo, acquired a 50.74% stake in Camlin Ltd.

== See also ==
- Hindustan Pencils
