= Belgaum =

Belgaum Bēḷagāma (Kannada) Belgaon
- City
- Belagavi
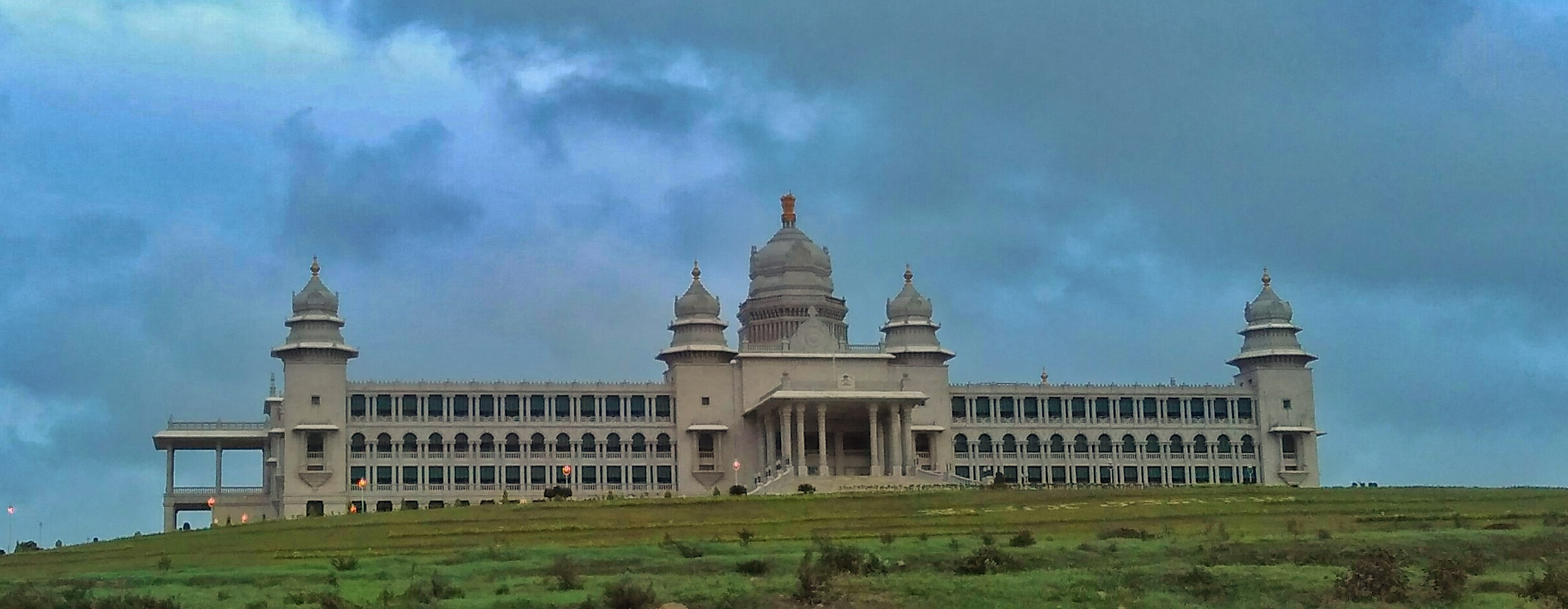
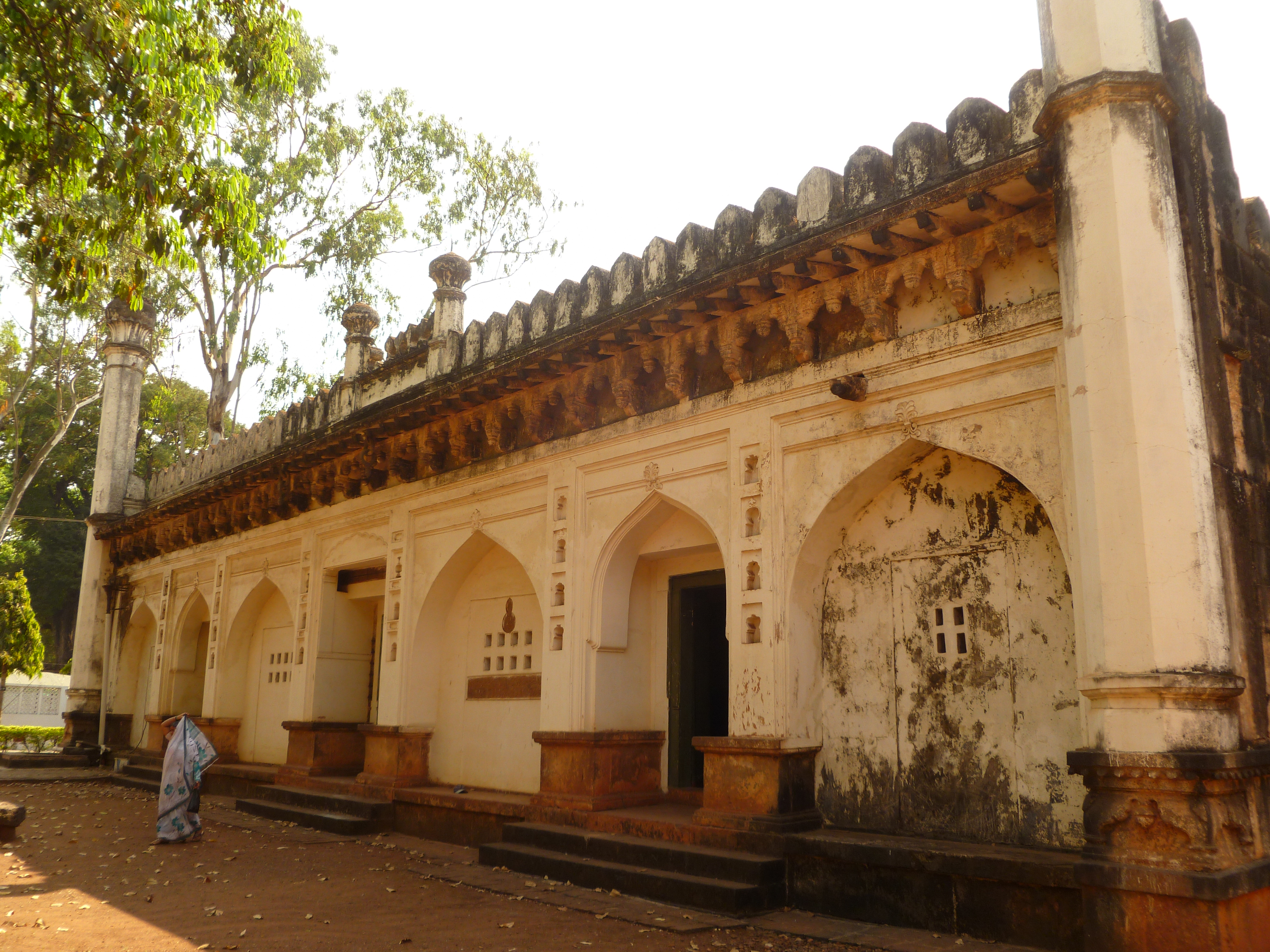
- Suvarna Vidhana Soudha, Belgaum Kamal Basti Safa Masjid
- Interactive map of Belgaum
- Coordinates: 15°51′N 74°30′E
- Country: India
- State: Karnataka
- District: Belagavi

Government
  - Type: Municipal corporation
  - Body: Belagavi Mahanagara Palike
  - Deputy Commissioner: Mohammad Roshan, IAS
  - Lok Sabha MP: Jagadish Shettar, BJP
  - Mayor: Savita Kamble, BJP
  - Deputy Mayor: Anand Chavan, BJP

Area
  - City: 94 km^{2} (36 sq mi)
  - Rural: 930 km^{2} (360 sq mi)
  - Rank: 4 (Karnataka)
- Elevation: 784 m (2,572 ft)

Population (2011)
  - City: 490,045
  - Density: 5,200/km^{2} (14,000/sq mi)
  - Rural: 449,805
- Demonym(s): Belgaumite, Belagavian, Belgoankar

Languages
  - Official: Kannada
- Time zone: UTC+5:30 (ST)
- PIN: 590001 to 590020
- Telephone code: (+91) 831
- Vehicle registration: KA-22
- Website: belagavi.nic.in

Belgaum (Kannada ISO: Beḷagāvi, IPA: [beɭɐɡaːʋi]; Marathi ISO: Beḷagāṃva, IPA: [beɭɡaːũ]), officially known as Belagavi (also Belgaon), is a city in the Indian state of Karnataka located near its northern western border in the Western Ghats. It is the administrative headquarters of the eponymous Belagavi division and Belagavi district. The Government of Karnataka has proposed making Belgaum the second capital of Karnataka alongside Bangalore, hence a second state administrative building Suvarna Vidhana Soudha was inaugurated on 11 October 2012.

Belgaum has been selected in first phase out of 20 cities, as one of the hundred Indian cities to be developed as a smart city under India's flagship Smart Cities Mission.

== History ==
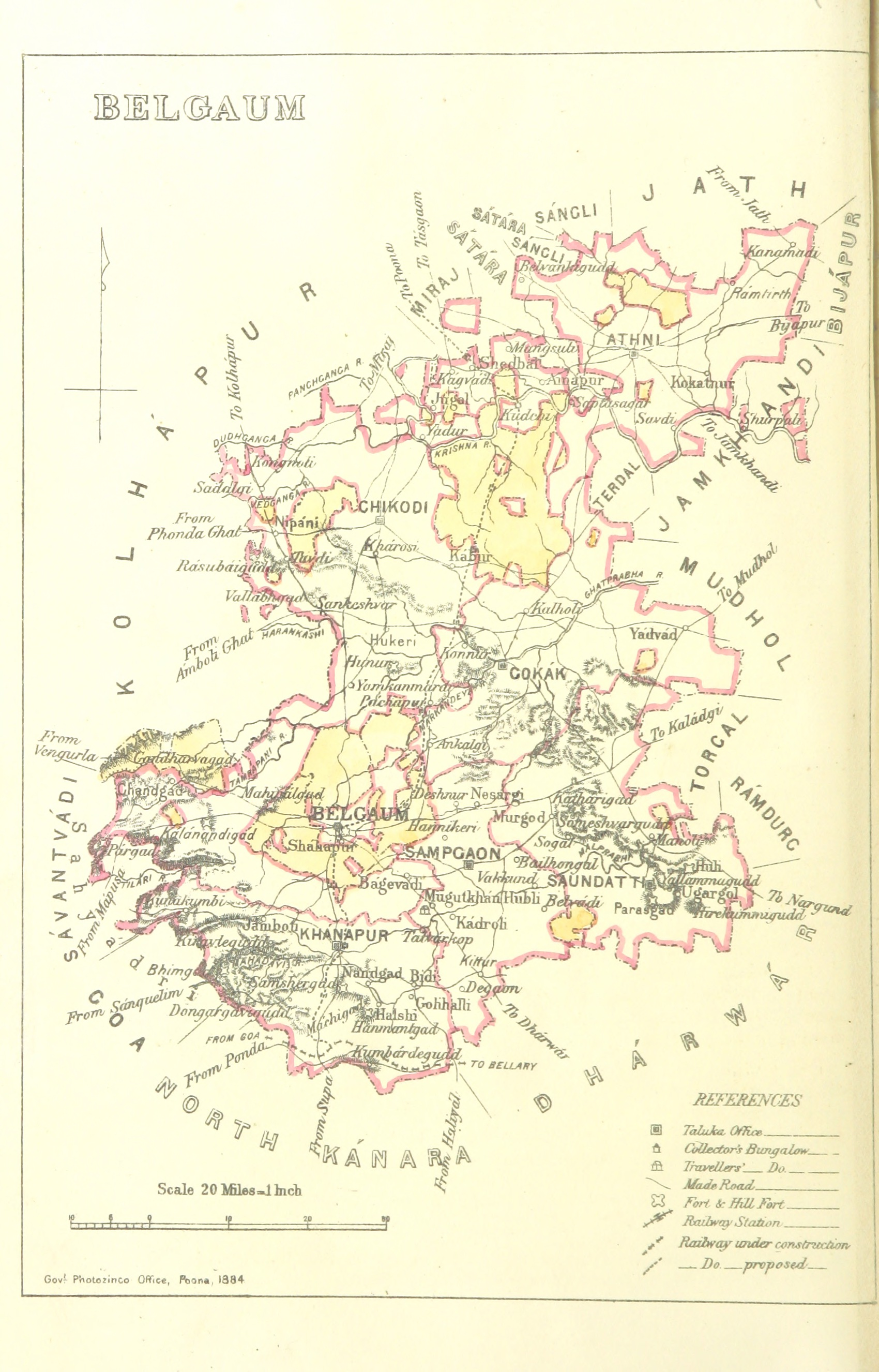
Belgaum 1896 map

Belgaum was founded in late 12th century AD by the Ratta dynasty, who shifted from nearby Saundatti. A Ratta official named Bichiraja built Kamal Basadi, a Jain temple, dedicated to Neminatha in 1204, which came to be called Kamalabasti. Pillars found inside Belgaum fort have Kannada inscriptions in Nagari scripts, one from 1199 by Ratta King Kartaveerya IV. The city's original name was Venugram, a Sanskrit word which means "village of bamboo". Alternatively, it is referred to as Venugram in early Indian texts, which means "city of bamboo".

Belgaum became a part of the Yadava dynasty kingdom (Seuna) in early 13th century. An inscription from 1261 of King Krishna belonging to the Yadava dynasty attests to this. The region was invaded by Khalji dynasty of Delhi Sultanate in 14th century. Shortly thereafter, the Vijayanagara Empire was founded, and Belgaum came under the rule of Vijayanagara. In 1474, the Bahmani Sultanate conquered Belgaum with an army led by Mahmud Gawan.

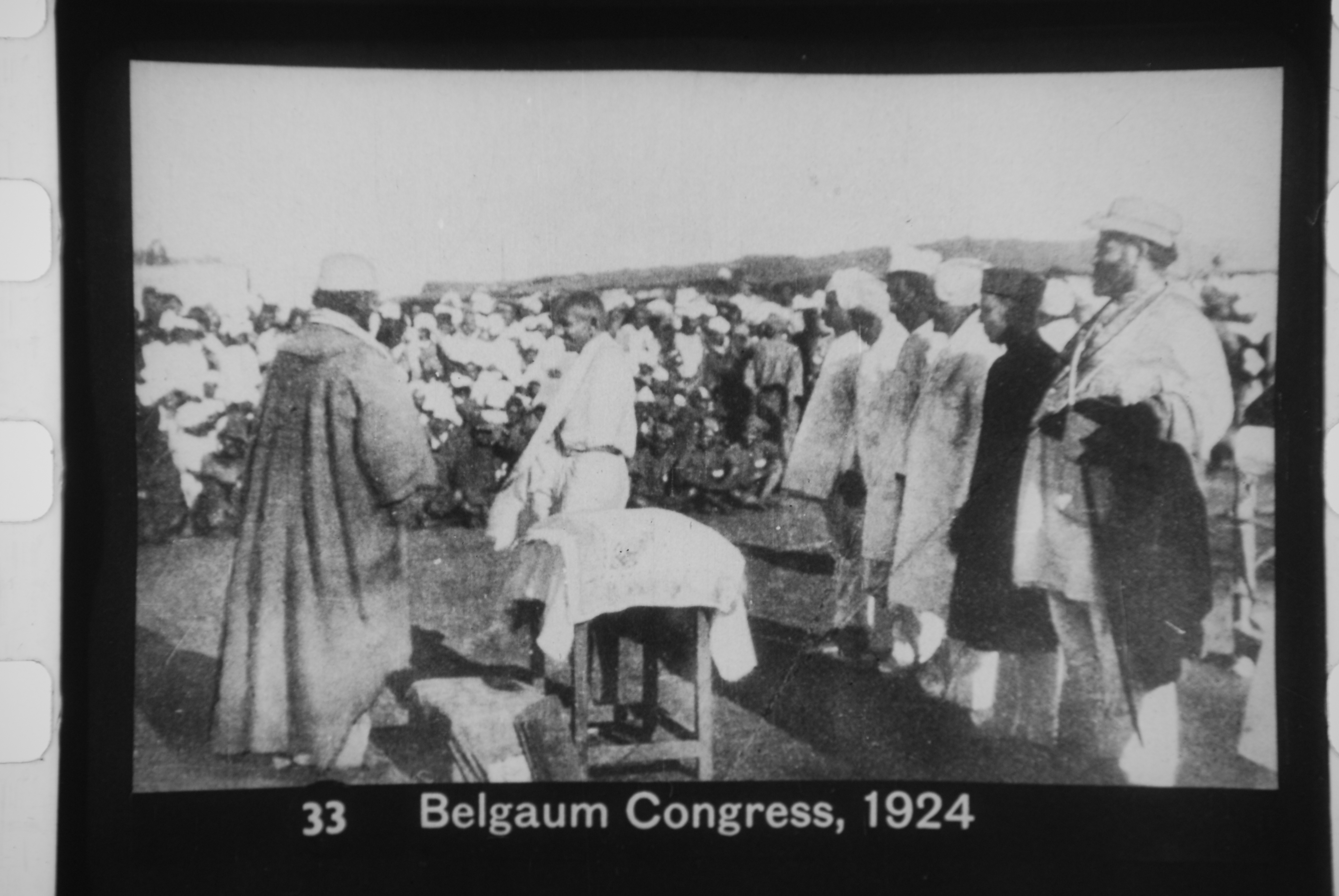
Mahatma Gandhi at the Belgaum Congress 1924

The Belgaum fort was strengthened by the Adil Shah dynasty Sultans and they built the Safa Mosque. A Persian inscription states that the mosque was built by Asad Khan, a Bijapur commander. In 1518, the Bahamani sultanate splintered into five small states and Belgaum became part of the Bijapur Sultanate. The Adilshahis extended their control to the port of Goa, but retreated after the arrival and wars with the Portuguese. In 1686, the Mughal emperor Aurangzeb overthrew the Bijapur sultanate and Belgaum passed nominally to the Mughals, who called it "Azamnagar". However, the Mughal empire control collapsed after the death of Aurangzeb in 1707. The Maratha confederacy took control of the area during the rule of the Peshwas. In 1776, the region was overrun by Hyder Ali and Tipu Sultan after Hyder Ali's coup in the Kingdom of Mysore. The Peshwa regained Belgaum, after Tipu Sultan was defeated by the British forces. In 1818, the British annexed Belgaum and the region in the control of the Peshwa. Kitturu Chennamma (1778–1829) was the queen of the princely state of Kittur in Karnataka and in 1824 she led an unsuccessful armed rebellion against the British in response to the Doctrine of lapse.

Belgaum was chosen as the venue of the 39th session of the Indian National Congress in December 1924 under the presidency of Mahatma Gandhi. The city served as a major military installation for the British Raj, primarily due to its proximity to Goa, which was then a Portuguese territory. Once the British left India, the Indian government continued and still continues to have armed forces installations in Belgaum. In 1961, the Indian government, under Prime Minister Jawaharlal Nehru, used military forces from Belgaum to end Portuguese rule of Goa.

When India became independent in 1947, Belgaum and its district were part of Bombay State. In 1956, the Indian states were reorganised along linguistic lines by the States Reorganisation Act and Belgaum including 10 taluks of Bombay State were transferred to Mysore State, which was renamed Karnataka in 1973.

In 2006, the Government of Karnataka announced that Belgaum would be made the state's second capital, and that the city would be a permanent venue for the annual 15-day winter session of the state legislature.

== City names ==
On 1 November 2014, the city's name was changed from Belgaum to Belagavi by the Karnataka government, with approval of the central government of India along with 12 other cities. Belgaum is known as Belgaon (IPA: [beːɭɡaːʋ]) in Maharashtra and amongst Marathi people.

== Geography ==
=== Topography ===
Belgaum is located at 15.87°N 74.5°E. It has an average elevation of 770 metres (2,530 feet). The city is in the northwestern parts of Karnataka and lies at the border of two states, Maharashtra and Goa on the western ghats (50 km (31 mi) from the Goa state border). It is one of the oldest towns in the state, lying 502 km (312 mi) from Bangalore, 500 km (310 mi) from Mumbai, 515 km (320 mi) from Hyderabad, and 600 km (370 mi) from Mysore. The district comprises 1278 villages with an area of 13,415 km^{2} (5,180 sq mi) and a population of around 4.8 million according to the census of 2011. Belgaum district is the biggest district of Karnataka. Situated near the foothills of the Sahyadri mountain range (Western Ghats) at an altitude of about 779 m (2,556 ft), 100 km (62 mi) from the Arabian Sea with the Markandeya river flowing nearby, Belgaum exhibits swift and kaleidoscopic changes in topography, vegetation and climate.

=== Climate ===
Belgaum has a tropical savanna climate (Köppen climate classification Aw). It is known for its pleasant year-round climate. Belgaum is at its coldest in winter (lowest temperature in Karnataka is usually recorded in Belgaum) and it experiences almost continuous monsoon rains from June through September. Belgaum sometimes receives hail storms during April.

Climate data for Belgaum (1991–2020, extremes 1901–2020)
Month	Jan	Feb	Mar	Apr	May	Jun	Jul	Aug	Sep	Oct	Nov	Dec	Year
Record high °C (°F)	35.7 (96.3)	38.4 (101.1)	40.0 (104.0)	41.9 (107.4)	41.2 (106.2)	39.2 (102.6)	33.6 (92.5)	35.0 (95.0)	34.3 (93.7)	36.6 (97.9)	34.6 (94.3)	34.6 (94.3)	41.9 (107.4)
Mean daily maximum °C (°F)	29.3 (84.7)	31.9 (89.4)	34.8 (94.6)	36.1 (97.0)	35.0 (95.0)	29.1 (84.4)	25.9 (78.6)	25.8 (78.4)	27.7 (81.9)	28.8 (83.8)	28.5 (83.3)	28.2 (82.8)	30.2 (86.4)
Mean daily minimum °C (°F)	15.2 (59.4)	16.2 (61.2)	18.7 (65.7)	20.9 (69.6)	21.7 (71.1)	21.5 (70.7)	20.8 (69.4)	20.5 (68.9)	20.2 (68.4)	20.2 (68.4)	18.1 (64.6)	15.9 (60.6)	19.2 (66.6)
Record low °C (°F)	7.2 (45.0)	6.7 (44.1)	10.0 (50.0)	12.0 (53.6)	15.6 (60.1)	11.4 (52.5)	13.1 (55.6)	15.7 (60.3)	14.5 (58.1)	12.2 (54.0)	9.3 (48.7)	8.4 (47.1)	6.7 (44.1)
Average rainfall mm (inches)	0.3 (0.01)	1.0 (0.04)	13.9 (0.55)	34.9 (1.37)	56.5 (2.22)	230.1 (9.06)	372.6 (14.67)	321.3 (12.65)	127.3 (5.01)	143.9 (5.67)	20.6 (0.81)	6.7 (0.26)	1,329 (52.32)
Average rainy days	0.0	0.0	0.8	2.8	4.0	12.8	19.6	18.5	9.3	7.7	1.5	0.4	77.3
Average relative humidity (%)	66	58	56	60	70	85	91	92	87	84	75	70	74
Source: India Meteorological Department

Climate data for Belgaum Airport (1991–2020, extremes 1952–2020)
Month	Jan	Feb	Mar	Apr	May	Jun	Jul	Aug	Sep	Oct	Nov	Dec	Year
Record high °C (°F)	34.2 (93.6)	38.0 (100.4)	39.2 (102.6)	40.2 (104.4)	40.2 (104.4)	38.8 (101.8)	32.4 (90.3)	31.6 (88.9)	33.7 (92.7)	33.8 (92.8)	32.8 (91.0)	33.8 (92.8)	40.2 (104.4)
Mean daily maximum °C (°F)	29.9 (85.8)	32.4 (90.3)	35.1 (95.2)	36.2 (97.2)	35.0 (95.0)	29.3 (84.7)	26.5 (79.7)	26.5 (79.7)	28.2 (82.8)	29.5 (85.1)	29.4 (84.9)	29.0 (84.2)	30.6 (87.1)
Daily mean °C (°F)	21.9 (71.4)	23.8 (74.8)	26.5 (79.7)	28.2 (82.8)	28.0 (82.4)	25.0 (77.0)	23.4 (74.1)	23.3 (73.9)	23.8 (74.8)	24.2 (75.6)	23.0 (73.4)	21.7 (71.1)	24.4 (75.9)
Mean daily minimum °C (°F)	13.8 (56.8)	15.1 (59.2)	18.0 (64.4)	20.3 (68.5)	21.2 (70.2)	21.0 (69.8)	20.4 (68.7)	20.1 (68.2)	19.5 (67.1)	19.0 (66.2)	16.6 (61.9)	14.3 (57.7)	18.3 (64.9)
Record low °C (°F)	6.4 (43.5)	6.5 (43.7)	7.7 (45.9)	12.8 (55.0)	15.0 (59.0)	18.2 (64.8)	17.4 (63.3)	15.5 (59.9)	14.4 (57.9)	12.3 (54.1)	7.7 (45.9)	7.7 (45.9)	6.4 (43.5)
Average rainfall mm (inches)	0.0 (0.0)	0.5 (0.02)	9.2 (0.36)	41.0 (1.61)	66.9 (2.63)	172.2 (6.78)	241.5 (9.51)	172.4 (6.79)	128.6 (5.06)	124.1 (4.89)	25.5 (1.00)	3.8 (0.15)	985.7 (38.81)
Average rainy days	0.0	0.1	1.0	3.2	4.0	11.1	17.1	14.6	9.3	6.8	1.6	0.3	69.0
Average relative humidity (%) (at 17:30 IST)	32	27	29	41	51	75	83	83	77	63	46	39	54
Source 1: India Meteorological Department
Source 2: Tokyo Climate Center (mean temperatures 1991–2020)

== Demographics ==
=== Population ===
According to the 1881 census, 64.39% of the population of Belgaum district were Kannada speakers and 26.04% spoke Marathi.

Religions in Belgaum City (2011)
Religion	Percent
Hinduism	73.24%
Islam	20.62%
Jainism	4.22%
Christianity	1.10%
Other or not stated	0.82%

As per the 2011 India census, the population of Belgaum city is 490,045. Males constitute 246,537 of the population and females 243,508. Belgaum has an average literacy rate of 88.92%: 93.78% for males and 85.84% for females. 10.71% of the population is under 6 years of age. Scheduled Castes and Scheduled Tribes make up 7.84% and 3.26% of the population respectively.

=== Languages ===
Languages of Belgaum City (2011)
1. Kannada (37.5%)
2. Marathi (32.9%)
3. Urdu (19.8%)
4. Konkani (2.64%)
5. Hindi (2.42%)
6. Telugu (1.92%)
7. Others (2.83%)

Kannada (37.46%) and Marathi (32.91%) are the predominant languages. Urdu is spoken by 19.82%, while Konkani (2.64%), Hindi (2.42%) and Telugu (1.92%) are also spoken.

== Government and politics ==
=== Administration ===
Belgaum city is administered by the Belagavi City Corporation, headed by a mayor and deputy mayor.The Belagavi City Corporation is the local government of the city of Belgaum. The administrative head of the Belagavi City Corporation is the municipal commissioner, appointed by the state government. There are 58 wards in the city corporation, each represented by an elected councillor.

Belgaum is located in the Belgaum Lok Sabha constituency.

==== Assembly session ====
In 2006, the Government of Karnataka decided to hold one week sessions of the Karnataka Legislative Assembly every year during the winter season at the Suvarna Vidhana Soudha administrative building, constructed and inaugurated in Belgaum in 2012.

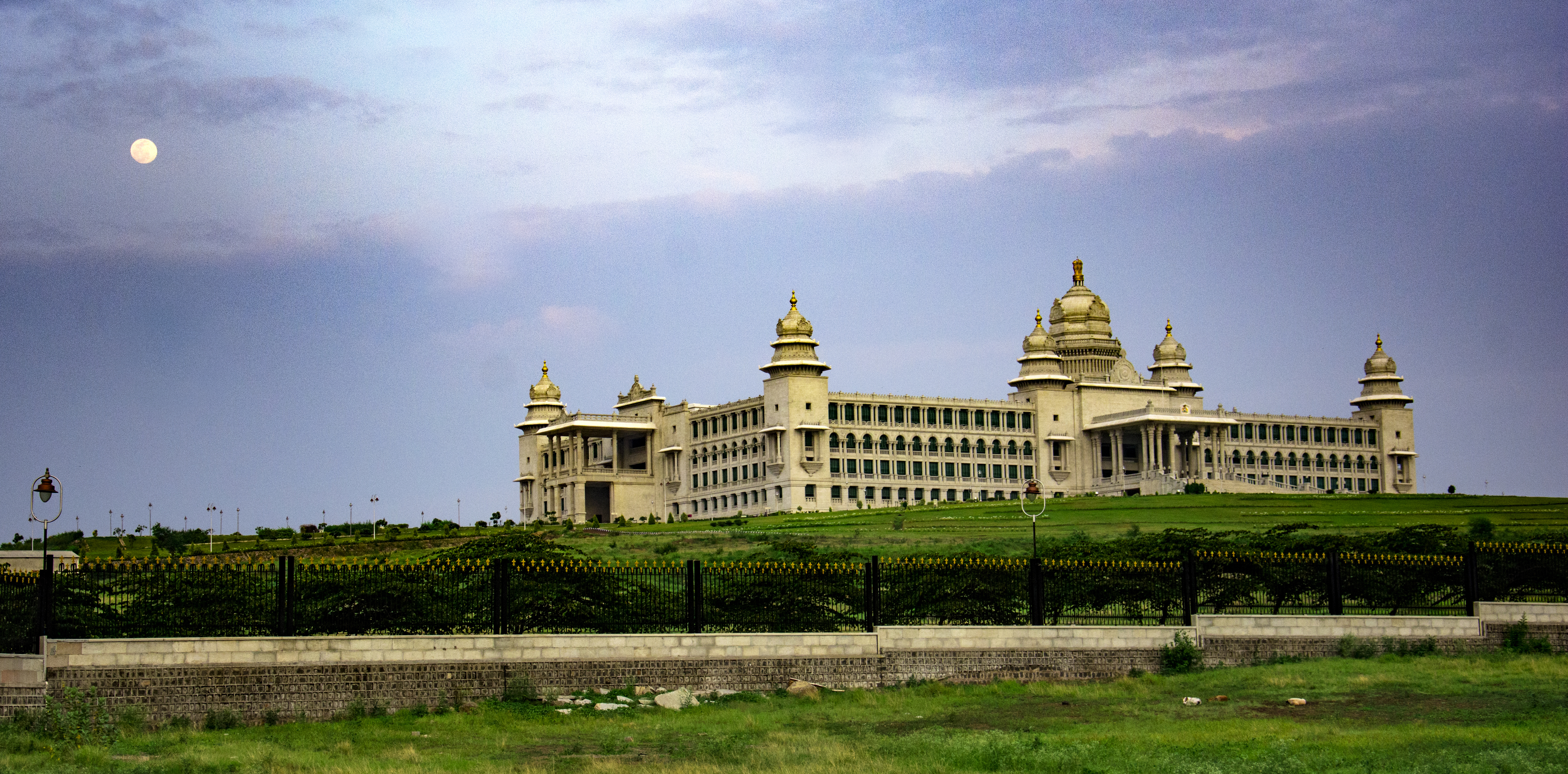
Suvarna Vidhana Soudha

== Belgaum border dispute ==
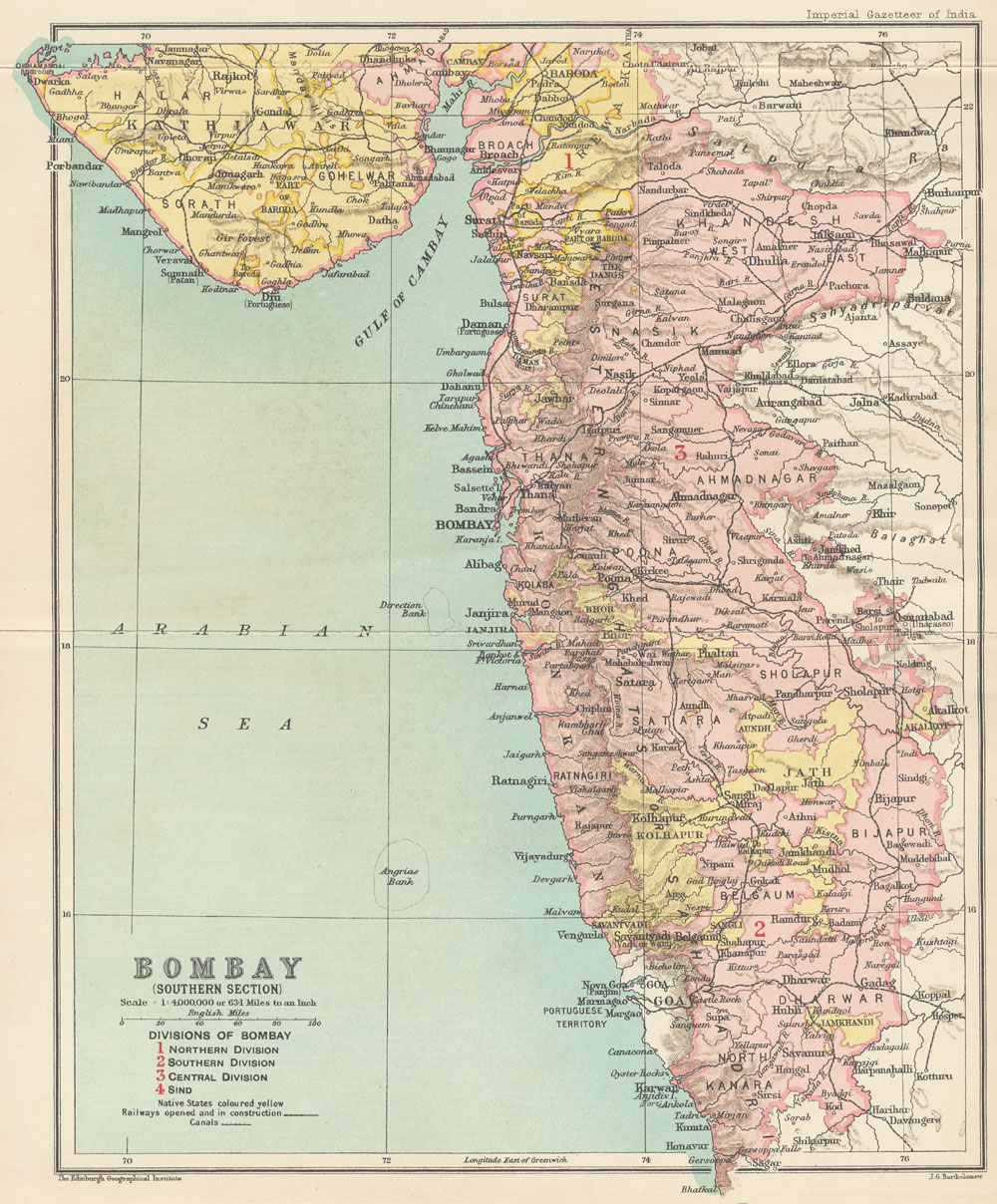
Map of the Bombay Presidency including Belgaum

The Belgaum border dispute is a dispute involving the Indian states of Karnataka and Maharashtra. Belgaum, currently a part of Karnataka and earlier the erstwhile Bombay Presidency, is claimed by Maharashtra on linguistic grounds. In 1956, the States Reorganization Act incorporated the Belgaum district including the 10 taluks in the Mysore state, which became Karnataka in 1973. Though according to the 1881 census, 64.39% of the population of Belgaum were Kannada speakers and 26.04% spoke Marathi.

In 1948, the Maharashtra Ekikaran Samiti, a Belgaum based regional organisation fighting for the merger, was formed. On 17 January 1956, Marathi activists against the inclusion were shot by the police forces of Mysore state. Since then, 17 January is observed as the 'martyr's day' by Maharashtra Ekikaran Samiti.

On 11 November 2005, Karnataka Rakshna Vedike (KRV) activists daubed Belgaum Mayor Vijay More's face with black paint (and later surrendered to the police) in the wake of Belgaum City Corporation (BCC) passing a resolution to include the district of Belgaum into Maharashtra, a neighbouring state. Upon his return to Belgaum, Vijay More was served with several show-cause notices by the Government of Karnataka and later dissolved the council.

Following this incident, in the following year's election, Prashanta Budavi, wife of KRV (Karnataka Rakshana Vedike) City President Shantinath Budavi was appointed as mayor of the Belgaum City Corporation. Maharashtra has asked to bring 865 disputed villages including Belgaum under centre's rule until Supreme court's final verdict. N.D. Patil, head of legal-committee appointed by Maharashtra government said that Karnataka is intensifying the problem. He added that Marathi people of border region are not able to live with honour and dignity under Karnataka's rule pointing out to the 'unconstitutional' dissolution of Belgaum city corporation and manhandling of Belgaum mayor by Kannada activists at Bangalore.

Even though case is pending in supreme court, in 2019, Deputy CM of Maharashtra Ajit Pawar called for the incorporation of Belgaum along with Karwar and Nipani area in Maharashtra citing it was of dream of Shiv Sena founder Bal Thackeray, a statement reiterated by CM Uddhav Thackeray in January 2021. Thackeray went on to term the region as 'Karnataka-occupied areas'. The case regarding the dispute is pending before the Supreme Court for many years.

== Economy ==
The city's humble industrial growth begin when an entrepreneur named Babu Rao Pusalkar set up a small unit in city over a century ago and that transformed Belgaum city into foundry and hydraulics base.

Belgaum is an important source of vegetables, fruits, meat, poultry, fish, mining production, and wood (due to heavy rainfall, rivers and the abundance of water). Trading in North Karnataka is mainly with Goa and Maharashtra along with major cities like Pune, Bangalore and Mangalore. Rich deposits of Bauxite are found in Belgaum district and have led to the creation of the Indian aluminium-producing company Hindalco Industries of the Aditya Birla Group. Uranium deposits have been found at Deshnur, a small village near Bailhongal town.

The Belgaum District Report provides detailed information about the local agricultural economy. The report describes the work of the pastoralists who herd large numbers of sheep and goats (approx 1.4m in 2003) - some settled in communities and others operating nomadically. They are supported by the Workers Development Union (known as Shramik Abhivrudhi Sangh or Jana Jagran) an NGO that provides a shepherd training program in sheep care, modern medicines and modern breeding practices.

A 300-acre (1.2 km^{2}) Special Economic Zone (India's first Private Aerospace SEZ) is being set up along the Pune-Bangalore National Highway (NH-4) to cater to the precision engineering requirements of the global aerospace, automotive and industrial verticals.

== Defence training centres ==
Belgaum's salubrious climate, proximity to the coast and strategic position near Portuguese Goa commended it to the British as a suitable location for an army training centre and cantonment, which it continues to be today for the Indian Armed Forces, along with an air force station of the Indian Air Force. The British had a sizeable infantry post here, having realised the military importance of its geographical location.

Development of a rail network for movement of resources and later troops was one of the means employed by both the East India Company and the British to exert control over India. Belgaum houses the Maratha Light Infantry Regimental Centre (MLIRC). It also houses the Commando Training Wing which is a part of the Junior Leaders Wing (formerly known as Infantry School, Belgaum). This establishment is affiliated to The Infantry School, Mhow. Herein, Infantry Officers and Soldiers are trained in endurance, escape and evasion, guerrilla and commando warfare techniques and to live off the land. The commando course at Belgaum is mandatory for all Infantry Officers. Officers of Other branches of the military and even some foreign officers undertake the course, upon being nominated to do so. In between the Military Hospital and the Junior Leaders Wing lies the Belgaum Military School, established in 1945 spread over an area of 64 acres (26 ha). The School provides quality education to sons of wards of Servicemen and Ex Servicemen of the Armed Forces. Several of them go on to join the National Defence Academy.

The Indo-Tibetan Border Police, ITBP, is building a full-fledged recreation and training centre in Belgaum at Halbhavi. Belgaum provides an excellent climate for recreation and ITBP will have large family bases in Belgaum for its soldiers after high altitude stressful duty.

The Central Reserve Police Force Institute of elite central paramilitary forces is setting up a national-level training institution (for jungle warfare) at Khanapur in Belgaum. The establishment, called the CoBRA School of Jungle Warfare is already operational.

== Culture ==
=== Cuisine ===
The cuisine of Belgaum is derived from the food cultures of three regions Karnataka, Konkan and Maharashtra. Typical breakfast items include poori-bhaji, idli-dosa, uppit (upma), sheera, sabudana khichadi and sabuvada. Chapatis, rice, Jolada Rotti (bhakari/jowar rotti), thalipeeth, jhunka and vegetables are eaten for lunch. Non-vegetarian preparations such as various seafoods are cooked in Goan, Maharashtrian, and North Karnataka style. Belgaum is noted for a specific kind of biryani, the Belgaum Biryani, which uses Belgaum Basmati Rice for its preparation.

Belgaum is known for kunda, a milk-based sweet. Another sweet, called maande in Marathi and mandige in Kannada, is a prerequisite for weddings.

== Transportation ==
=== Road ===
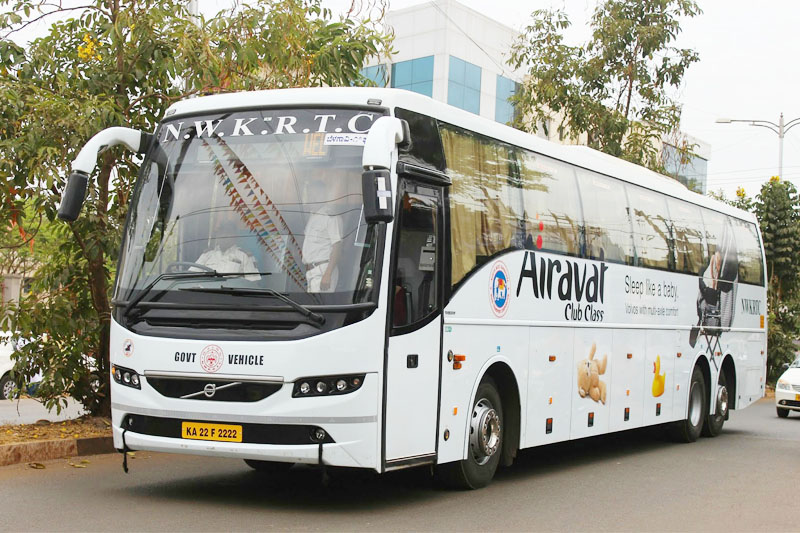
NWKRTC'S Airavat Club Class

Belgaum is connected by road via national highways 4 (connecting Maharashtra (now part of the Golden Quadrilateral), Karnataka, Telangana, Andhra Pradesh and Tamil Nadu) and 4A (connecting Karnataka and Goa). North Western Karnataka Road Transport Corporation (NWKRTC) run buses to all corners of Karnataka and to neighbouring states. There are many prominent private bus companies providing services to all major destinations in Karnataka and surrounding states. KSRTC services almost all villages in Karnataka. 92% villages are served by KSRTC (6,743 out of 7,298 Villages) and 44% in other areas. KSRTC operates 6463 schedules in a day covering an effective distance of 2374,000 km with a total fleet of 7599 buses. It transports, on an average, 2457,000 passengers per day.

The North Western Karnataka Road Transport Corporation was established on 1 November 1997, under provision of the Road Transport Corporation Act 1950, on the auspicious day of Karnataka Rajyotsava upon bifurcation from Karnataka State Road Transport Corporation to provide adequate, efficient, economic and properly coordinated transport services to the commuters of North Western part of Karnataka. The Corporation jurisdiction covers the districts of Belgaum, Dharwad, Karwar, Bagalkot, Gadag & Haveri.

NWKRTC operates its services to all villages, which have motorable roads in its jurisdiction, and also covers intra- and inter- state transport operations.

The Government of Goa operates KADAMBA bus service from Goa to Belgaum city and some other parts of the Belgaum District.

The Government of Maharashtra also operates MSRTC buses from various parts of Maharashtra to Belgaum City and some other parts of the Belgaum District.

=== Air ===
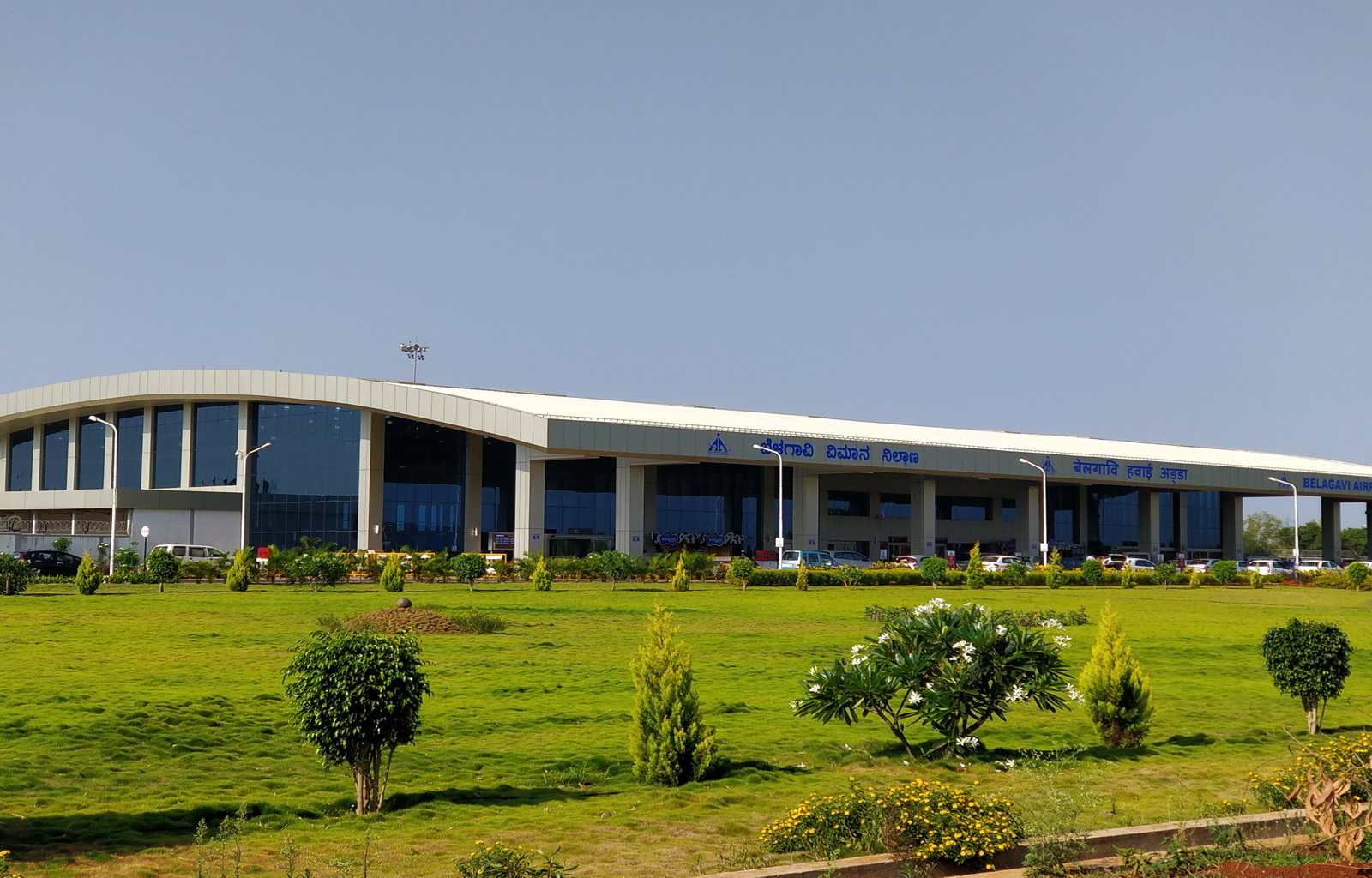
Belgaum Airport

The city is served by Belgaum Airport at Sambra, which is the oldest airport in North Karnataka and lies 10 kilometres (6.2 mi) from the city on State Highway 20. Belgaum airport is included in UDAN 3 scheme. Alliance Air, SpiceJet, Star Air, IndiGo and TruJet have flights to Bangalore, Hyderabad, Mysore, Kadapa, Tirupati, Surat, Ahmedabad, Indore, Mumbai, Pune, Nagpur, Kolhapur, Nashik and Chennai. Flight connectivity to Jodhpur will be soon started by Star Air in the future days.

=== Rail ===
Belgaum railway station

Belgaum railway station is on the Indian Railways grid, being part of the South Western railways, and is well connected by rail to major destinations.

== Education ==
=== VTU ===
Visvesvaraya Technological University (VTU), named after Bharat Ratna Sir M Visweshwariah, is located in Machhe in Belgaum. It has more than 208 affiliated colleges. Over 67,000 students graduate from VTU every year.

=== Rani Channamma University ===
Rani Channamma University was established in 2010 by upgrading the post-graduate centre of Karnatak University, Dharwad. Before the Rani Channamma University came into being in 2010, Karnatak University KRCPG Centre of Karnatak University, Dharwad was functioning at Belgaum. The Karnatak University PG Centre was established at Belgaum in the year 1982, to provide an opportunity to develop access to the students for higher education hailing from North Karnataka Region. In 1994 the PG centre was shifted to the present campus of 172 acres of land at Bhutramanahatti adjacent to the Pune-Bangalore National Highway – 4 NH 4, about 18 km from Belgaum. Karnatak University PG Centre has been declared as Rani Channamma University in the month of July 2010 with the jurisdiction of Belgaum, Vijaypur, and Bagalkot districts.

== Media ==
Newspapers include Vijaya Karnataka, Vijay Vani, Kannada Prabha, Samyukta Karnataka, Prajavani, and Kannadamma in Kannada; The Times of India and Deccan Herald in English, and Tarun Bharat, Sakaal, Pudhari in Marathi.

== Notable people ==
- M. V. Chandgadkar, cricket administrator and board secretary
- Phadeppa Dareppa Chaugule, India's first Olympic marathon runner
- Raosaheb Gogte, industrialist of the Gogte Group. Namesake of the Gogte Institute of Technology, Gogte College of Commerce and Science, and the Gogte Circle in Belgaum.
- Atul Kulkarni, actor
- Raai Laxmi, actor
- Ronit More, Indian Cricket Player
- Bandu Patil, Indian hockey player
- Nima Poovaya-Smith, museum curator, art historian and writer
- Alice Maude Sorabji Pennell, Doctor and writer
- Charan Raj, actor
- Pavani Reddy, actor
- Cornelia Sorabji, lawyer and writer. Notably the first woman to practice law in India and Britain.
- Shri Thanedar, American politician

== See also ==
- North Karnataka
- Jainism in North Karnataka
- Jainism in Karnataka
- Suvarna Vidhana Soudha
- Ramnagar, Uttara Kannada
