= Pune Mahanagar Parivahan Mahamandal Limited =

Bus service serving areas of Pune & Pimpri-Chinchwad

Pune Mahanagar Parivahan Mahamandal Limited (PMPML)

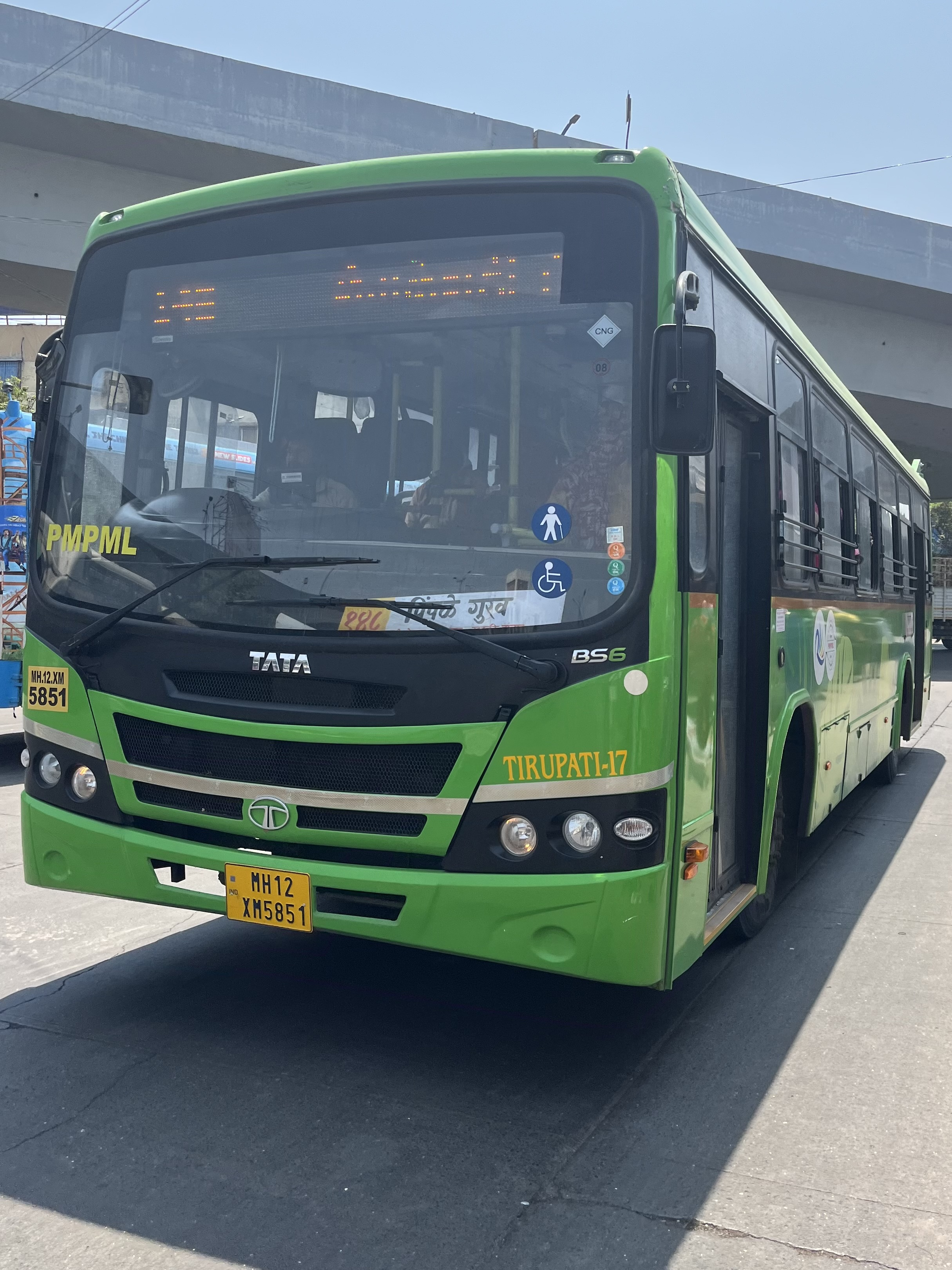
- A PMPML CNG Bus at Hadapsar
- Founded: 19 October 2007
- Headquarters: Shankar Sheth Road, Pune, India
- Locale: Pune Metropolitan Region
- Service area: Pune city, Pimpri-Chinchwad & Rajiv Gandhi Infotech Park - Phases I, II & III
- Service type: Bus and Rainbow BRT
- Routes: 381
- Hubs: Aundh; Bhosari; Chinchwad; Deccan Gymkhana; Dhankawadi; Hadapsar; Katraj; Kothrud; Nigdi; Pimpri; PMC Bhavan; Pune Railway Station; Shivaji Nagar; Swargate
- Depots: 15 And 2 Proposed
- Fleet: 1584 buses
- Daily ridership: c.13,50,000
- Fuel type: CNG & Electric (No more on Diesel)
- Managing Director: Pankaj Deore, IAS
- Website: www.pmpml.org

Pune Mahanagar Parivahan Mahamandal Ltd (PMPML) is the public transport bus service provider for the Pune Metropolitan Region.

It operates 381 routes around the Pune Metropolitan Region including 51 Rainbow BRT routes that partially ply on the 4 bus rapid transit corridors. As of mid-2022, PMPML has become the only fleet in the country to operate exclusively on green fuel, utilizing CNG and electric buses. Since 2019, PMPML has been running both 9-meter and 12-meter electric AC buses at the same fare as regular buses. It is the only fleet in the country that operates approximately 400 electric buses daily, providing essential infrastructure and contributing to a reliable public transport service.

== History ==
=== Early history ===
Pune Nagarpalika, the predecessor of the Pune Municipal Corporation (PMC), conceived the idea of a public transport system for the city in the 1940s which materialized when the Regional Transport Office gave its nod for M/s. Silver Jubilee Motors to take up the charge. The service that began with 4 routes with 20 buses already had increased to 46 buses by 1948.

=== PMT and PCMT ===
After the transformation of Pune Nagarpalika into PMC in 1950, the civic body took over the service. Pune Municipal Transport (PMT), as it was named after the takeover, started with a fleet of 57 buses that plied on 14 routes.

The public transport provider for the industrial city, Pimpri Chinchwad Municipal Transport (PCMT), was founded on 4 March 1974 with a fleet of 8 buses plying between Pimpri and Bhosari. PCMT saw rapid expansion and already by 1988, it had a fleet of 101 buses plying on 13 routes.

=== Merger ===
A proposal for merger of PMT and PCMT into a unified company to serve the larger metropolitan regions was proposed as early as 1992, when the general body of the PMC passed a resolution supporting such merger. However, the PCMC only considered a merger in 2003. The merger was formally announced in April 2007 and PMPML as it exists today came into being on 19 October 2007.

== Operations ==
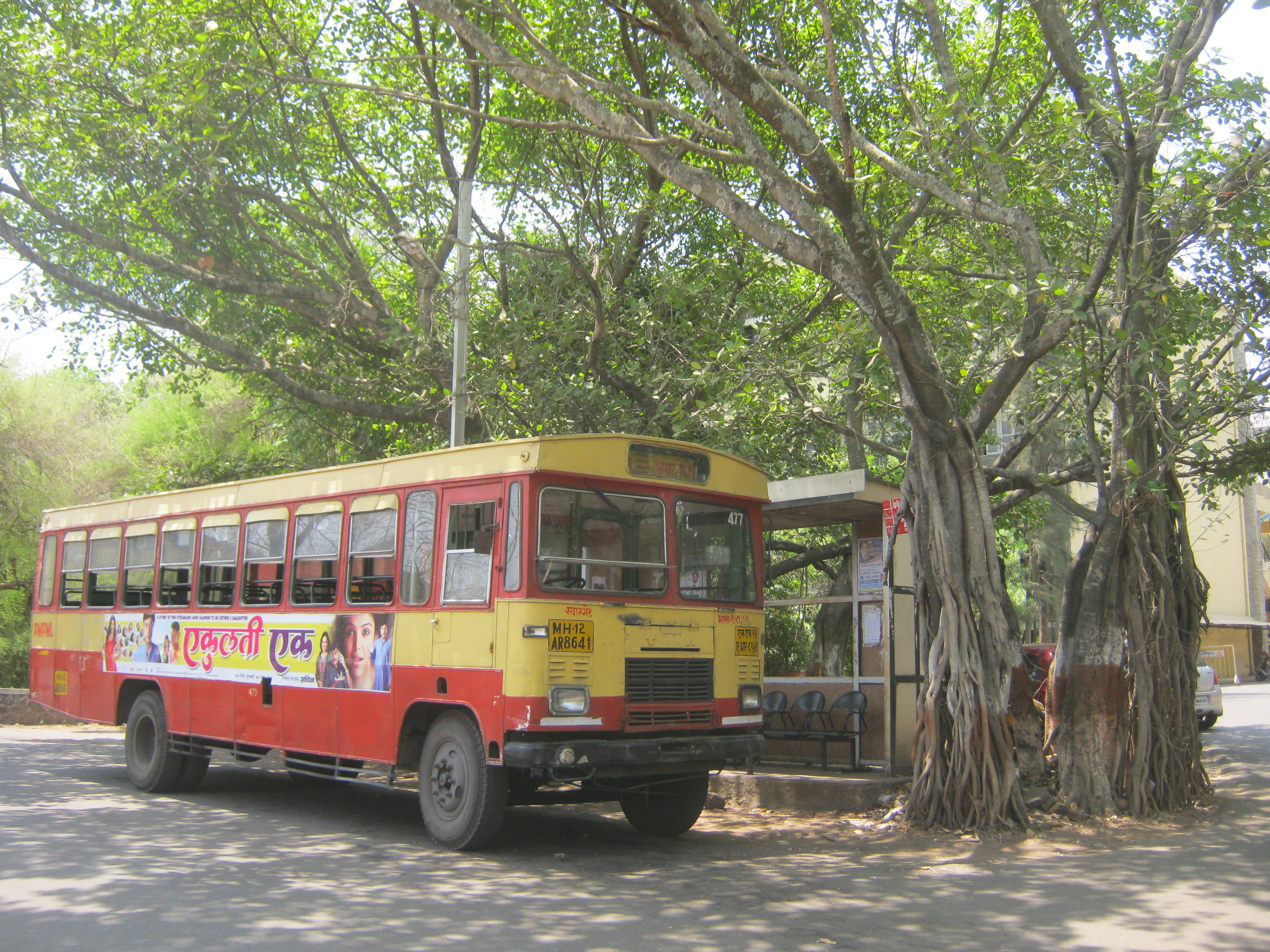
An old PMT era bus with PMPML spotted in Pune university on route 25

PMPML has a fleet of 2000 buses maintained at 9 CNG bus depots and 4 electric bus depots, which ferry around 900,000 passengers every day. There is no diesel bus running in the fleet. 12-meter electric buses are deployed on all major routes at high frequency. 9-meter CNG buses travel numerous roads, including city centers, and also provide transport to students of PMC schools. Distant towns like Lonavala, Mulshi, Panshet, Sarola, Nira, Patas, Shirur, Rajgurunagar, etc. are becoming part of the service. PMPML also provides a special electric bus service to Infosys employees commuting from Pune city and Pimpri-Chinchwad to the Hinjawadi IT hub and back.

PMPML acquired the first lot of 25 electric buses in February 2019 and the second lot of 50 electric buses in August 2019. As of August 2022, the fleet size of electric buses is 395. PMPML also plans to acquire 1000 such electric buses by the end of 2023.

== Services ==
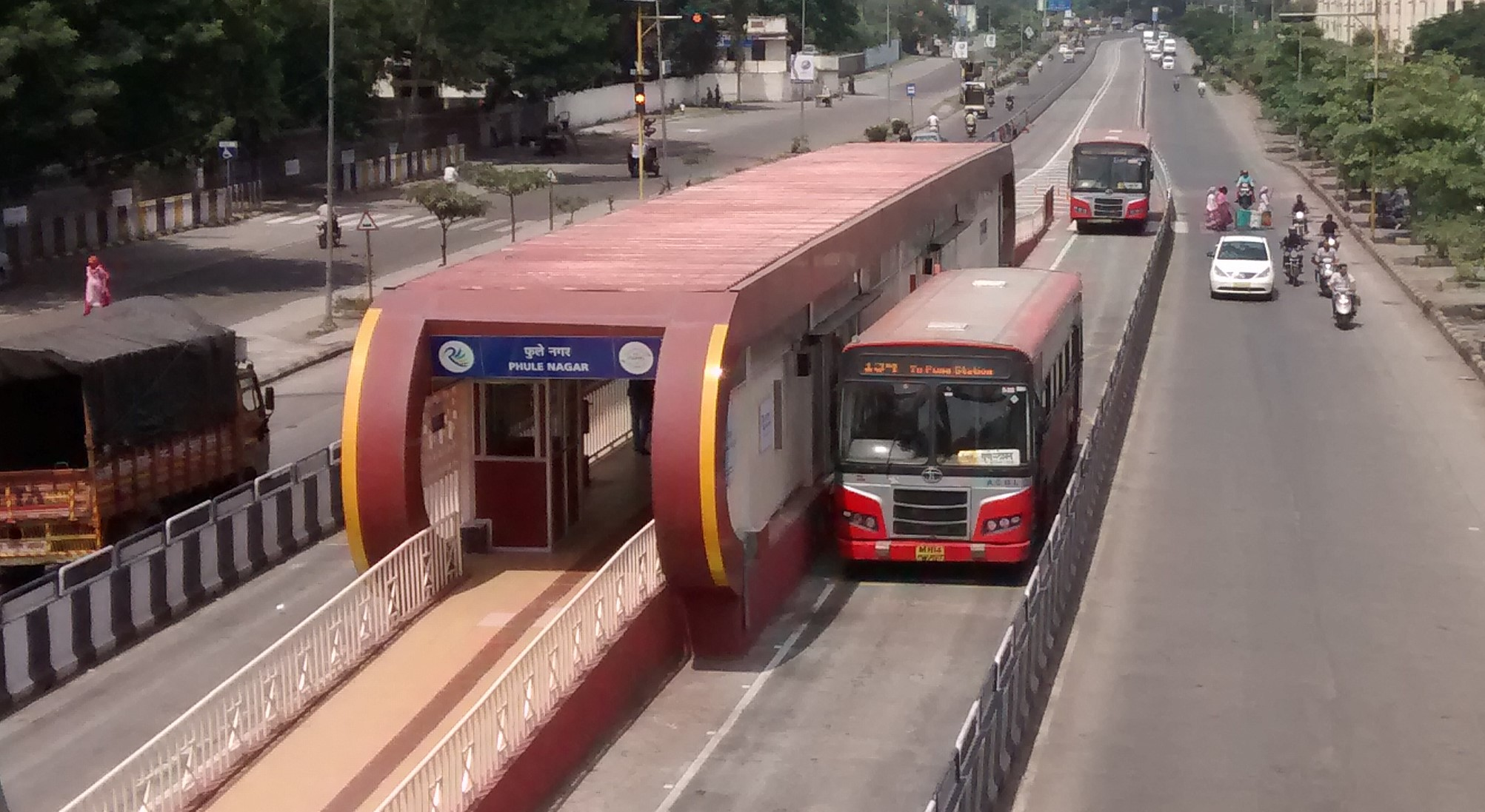
A bus stop on Rainbow BRT corridor

PMPML operates regular scheduled services daily between 5:30 am and midnight on 371 routes. The frequencies on individual routes vary greatly according to demand. Certain long-distance routes are serviced only a few times per day. Some of these routes are partially or fully run on the BRT corridors under the brand name Rainbow BRTS.

PMPML also operates night buses after midnight on 7 routes. On the occasion of International Women's Day 2018, PMPML launched 'Tejaswini' (Marathi: तेजस्विनी; radiant) bus services exclusively for women which were well received by women commuters. There 218 daily Tejaswini services during the morning and afternoon peak hours on eight of the busiest routes. PMPML also runs special services for tourists under the name 'Pune Darshan' as well as airport services from Rajiv Gandhi IT Park, Hinjawadi to Pune Airport.

Name of the Service	Description	Manufacturer	Gallery
CNG (Green)	It is a non-AC CNG-led bus service with a green livery for Tata Marcopolo and Ashok Leyland JanBus models..	Tata Marcopolo; Ashok Leyland JanBus	Pune green bus Pune Ashley green bus
CNG (Blue)	It is a non-AC CNG-led bus service with a blue livery for the old Tata Marcopolo and Ashok Leyland JanBus models	Tata Marcopolo; Ashok Leyland JanBus	
Electric (white)	It is an electric-led bus service with a white livery for the Olectra K9D and K7D models	Olectra K9D; Olectra K7D	

== Bus Routes ==
The following is a list of Bus Routes operated by PMPML in the vicinity of Pune, Pimpri-Chinchwad, and outer rural areas near Pune and Pimpri-Chinchwad i.e. PMRDA, as of November 22nd, 2026.

Route number	Origin	Destination	Via	Depot	Ref
2	Swargate	Shivaji Nagar	Shanipar, ABC, Manapa	Swargate	
2A	Katraj	Shivaji Nagar	Balaji Nagar, Padmavati, Natubaug, Bhapkar Petrol Pump, Swargate, Shanipar, ABC, Manapa	Katraj	
2B (RING)	Swargate	Swargate	Shanipar, ABC, Manapa, Shivaji Nagar, Patil Estate, Wakdewadi, Patil Estate, Shivaji Nagar, Manapa, Vasant Talkies, Mandai	Swargate	
3 (RING)	Swargate	Swargate	Tilak Road, Perugate, ABC, Shaniwar Wada, Lal Mahal, Phadke Haud, Somwar Peth, Pune Station, Somwar Peth, Phadke Haud, Vasant Talkies, ABC, Hirabaug	Swargate	
4	Shivaji Nagar	Swargate	JM Road, Deccan, Alka Talkies, Tilak Road	Swargate	
5	Pune Station	Swargate	Somwar Peth, Rasta Peth, Nana Peth, Ramoshi Gate	Swargate	
6	Pune Station	Swargate	Somwar Peth, Phadke Haud, Ganesh Peth, Alpana Talkies, Nana Peth, Ramoshi Gate	Swargate	
7	Deccan Gymkhana	Pulgate (Mahatma Gandhi Stand)	Alka Talkies, Kumthekar Road, Mandai, Ganesh Peth, Nana Peth, Bhawani Peth, Juna Motorstand	Swargate	
8	Pune Station	Deccan Gymkhana	Somwar Peth, Phadke Haud, Vasant Talkies, ABC, Kesari Wada, Narayan Peth, Alka Talkies	Swargate	
9	Pune Station	Deccan Gymkhana	Somwar Peth, Phadke Haud, Budhwar Peth, City Post, Laxmi Road, Alka Talkies	Swargate	
11	Marketyard	Pimple Gurav	Gultekdi, Swargate, Shanipar, ABC, Manapa, Shivaji Nagar, Patil Estate, Wakdewadi, Mula Road, Khadki Cantt, Khadki Bazar, Bopodi, Dapodi	Upper	
11A	Marketyard	Kasarwadi Railway Station	Gultekdi, Swargate, Shanipar, ABC, Manapa, Shivaji Nagar, Patil Estate, Wakdewadi, Mula Road, Khadki Cantt, Khadki Bazar, Bopodi, Dapodi, Pimple Gurav, Kalpataru Society	Upper	
11B	Marketyard	Dapodi	Gultekdi, Swargate, Shanipar, ABC, Manapa, Shivaji Nagar, Patil Estate, Wakdewadi, Mula Road, Khadki Cantt, Khadki Bazar, Bopodi, Dapodi Mantri Niketan	Upper	
11C	Katraj	Pimple Gurav	Balaji Nagar, Padmavati, Natubaug, Bhapkar Petrol Pump, Swargate, Shanipar, ABC, Manapa, Shivaji Nagar, Patil Estate, Wakdewadi, Mula Road, Khadki Cantt, Khadki Bazar, Bopodi, Dapodi	Katraj	
12	Shivaji Nagar	Upper Depot	JM Road, Deccan, Alka Talkies, Ganjavewadi, Lokmanya Nagar, Dandekar Pul, Swargate, Bhapkar Petrol Pump, Vasantbaug, Bibwewadi	Upper	
13	Shivaji Nagar	Upper Depot	Manapa, Vasant Talkies, Mandai, Swargate, Bhapkar Petrol Pump, Vasantbaug, Bibwewadi	Upper	
13B	Upper Depot	Khadki Railway Station	Bibwewadi, Vasantbaug, Bhapkar Petrol Pump, Swargate, Tilak Road, Alka Talkies, Deccan, FC Road, Shivaji Nagar, Mhasoba Gate, University Gate, Pune University, Joshi Gate, Ayyappa Mandir	Upper	
15	Bhekrainagar	Dhayari DSK Vishwa	Hadapsar, Ramtekdi, Fatima Nagar, Pulgate, Golibar Maidan, Swargate, Dandekar Pul, Panmala, Sinhgad Road, Vitthalwadi, Anand Nagar, Vadgaon Bridge, Dhayari Phata, Dhayari Gaon	Bhekrainagar	
15A	Shewalewadi	Dhayari Yash Platinum Society	Manjari Phata, Hadapsar, Ramtekdi, Fatima Nagar, Pulgate, Golibar Maidan, Swargate, Dandekar Pul, Panmala, Sinhgad Road, Vitthalwadi, Anand Nagar, Vadgaon Bridge, Dhayari Phata, Dhayari Gaon	Shewalewadi	
17	Shivaji Nagar	Narhe Gaon	Manapa, Vasant Talkies, Mandai, Swargate, Laxmi Narayan Talkies, Dandekar Pul, Panmala, Sinhgad Road, Vitthalwadi, Anand Nagar, Vadgaon Bridge, Dhayari Phata, Manaji Nagar	Swargate	
19	Swargate	Yewalewadi	Maharshi Nagar, Gultekdi, Marketyard, Gangadham Chowk, Lulla Nagar, Kamela, Kondhwa Khurd, Somji Chowk, Khadi Machine Chowk, Kondhwa Budruk	Swargate	
19A	Swargate	Yewalewadi	Maharshi Nagar, Gultekdi, Marketyard, Gangadham Chowk, Aai Mata Mandir, Kakade Vasti, Tilekar Nagar, Khadi Machine Chowk, Kondhwa Budruk	Swargate	
19B	Swargate	VIIT College Kondhwa Budruk	Maharshi Nagar, Gultekdi, Marketyard, Gangadham Chowk, Aai Mata Mandir, Kakade Vasti	Upper	
21	Swargate	Sangvi	Shanipar, ABC, Manapa, Shivaji Nagar, Mhasoba Gate, University Gate, Sakal Nagar, Baner Phata, Sanewadi ITI, Parihar Chowk, Aundh, Sangvi Phata, BG College, Juni Sangvi	Swargate	
21A	Swargate	Sangvi	Shanipar, ABC, Manapa, Shivaji Nagar, Mhasoba Gate, University Gate, Sakal Nagar, Baner Phata, Sanewadi ITI, Parihar Chowk, Medipoint, Westend Mall, Sangvi Phata, BG College, Juni Sangvi	Swargate	
22	Swargate	Undri Wadachiwadi	Maharshi Nagar, Marketyard, Gangadham Chowk, Lulla Nagar, Kamela, Kondhwa Khurd, Somji Chowk, Khadi Machine Chowk, Pisoli	Swargate	
24	Katraj	Maharashtra Housing Board Samtanagar	Balaji Nagar, Padmavati, Date Stop, Sarang Society, Swargate, Ramoshi Gate, Nana Peth, Rasta Peth, Pune Station, Ruby Hall Clinic, Bund Garden, Yerwada, Netaji High School	Katraj	
24A	Katraj	Lohegaon	Balaji Nagar, Padmavati, Natubaug, Bhapkar Petrol Pump, Swargate, Ramoshi Gate, Nana Peth, Rasta Peth, Pune Station, Ruby Hall Clinic, Bund Garden, Yerwada, Netaji High School, Nagpur Chawl, 509 Chowk, Air Force Station	Katraj	
25	Shivaji Nagar	Bageshree Society (Nanded City)	Manapa, Vasant Talkies, Mandai, Swargate, Laxmi Narayan Talkies, Dandekar Pul, Panmala, Sinhgad Road, Vitthalwadi, Anand Nagar, Vadgaon Bridge, Dhayari Phata, Rajyog Society, Nanded City, Kaleshree Society, Aalaap	Swargate	
26	Shivaji Nagar	Dhankawadi	JM Road, Deccan, Alka Talkies, Tilak Road, Swargate, Bhapkar Petrol Pump, Natubaug, Padmavati, Balaji Nagar	Na.Ta.Wadi	
27	Shivaji Nagar	Bharti Vidyapeeth	JM Road, Deccan, Alka Talkies, Tilak Road, Swargate, Bhapkar Petrol Pump, Natubaug, Padmavati, Balaji Nagar	Katraj	
29	Swargate	Alandi	Golibar Maidan, Pulgate, Westend, Pune Station, Ruby Hall Clinic, Bund Garden, Yerwada, Deccan College, Phule Nagar, Vishrantwadi, Kalas, Dighi, Magazine Chowk, Sai Mandir, Charholi Phata	Swargate	
29A	Marketyard	Alandi	Gultekdi, Swargate, Golibar Maidan, Pulgate, Westend, Pune Station, Ruby Hall Clinic, Bund Garden, Yerwada, Deccan College, Phule Nagar, Vishrantwadi, Kalas, Dighi, Magazine Chowk, Sai Mandir, Charholi Phata	Swargate	
30	Marketyard	Ghotawade Phata	Gultekdi, Swargate, Shanipar, ABC, Manapa, Shivaji Nagar, Mhasoba Gate, University Gate, NCL, Pashan, Sai Chowk, Sus Gaon, Tapkir Vasti, Nande Gaon, Lavale, Rautwadi, Pirangut	Upper	
34	Aundh Gaon	Nigdi	Sangvi Phata, Rakshak Chowk, Wakad Phata, Jagtap Dairy, Kalewadi Phata, Dange Chowk, Tathawade, Punawale, Ravet, Mukai Chowk Kiwale, Adarsh Nagar, Bhondve Patil Estate, Appu Ghar, Transport Nagar	Baner	
35	Manapa Bhavan	Mukai Chowk Kiwale	Shivaji Nagar, Mhasoba Gate, University Gate, Bremen Chowk, Aundh, Sangvi Phata, Rakshak Chowk, Wakad Phata, Jagtap Dairy, Kalewadi Phata, Dange Chowk, Tathawade, Punawale, Ravet	Nigdi & Na.Ta.Wadi	
35A	Manapa Bhavan	Indira College Tathawade	Shivaji Nagar, Mhasoba Gate, University Gate, Bremen Chowk, Aundh, Sangvi Phata, Rakshak Chowk, Wakad Phata, Jagtap Dairy, Kalewadi Phata, Dange Chowk, Tathawade, JSPM College, Bhumkar Chowk	Baner	
37	Wakdewadi ST Stand	Sahakar Nagar	Patil Estate, Shivaji Nagar, Manapa, Vasant Talkies, Mandai, Swargate, Laxmi Nagar, Dashbhuja Ganpati	Na.Ta.Wadi	
38	Na.Ta.Wadi	Dhankawadi	Shivaji Nagar, Manapa, Vasant Talkies, Mandai, Swargate, Bhapkar Petrol Pump, Natubaug, Padmavati, Balaji Nagar	Katraj	
39	Pune Station	Dhankawadi	Somwar Peth, Rasta Peth, Nana Peth, Ramoshi Gate, Apsara Talkies, Gultekdi, Maharshi Nagar, Bhapkar Petrol Pump, Natubaug, Padmavati, Balaji Nagar	Katraj	
40	Swargate	Warje Malwadi	Dandekar Pul, Panmala, Dattawadi, Mhatre Pul, DP Road, Sahwas Society, Rajaram Pul, Cummins College, Karve Nagar, Galinde Path	Swargate	
41	Upper Depot	Sangvi	Bibwewadi, Vasantbaug, Bhapkar Petrol Pump, Swargate, Tilak Road, Alka Talkies, Deccan, Goodluck Chowk, Bhandarkar Road, Symbiosis College, SB Road, Chatushrungi, University Gate, Sakal Nagar, Baner Phata, Sanewadi ITI, Parihar Chowk, Aundh, Sangvi Phata, BG College, Juni Sangvi	Upper	
42	Katraj	Nigdi Bhakti Shakti	Balaji Nagar, Padmavati, Natubaug, Bhapkar Petrol Pump, Swargate, Dandekar Pul, Lokmanya Nagar, Ganjavewadi, Alka Talkies, Deccan, FC Road, Shivaji Nagar, Patil Estate, Wakdewadi, Khadki, Bopodi, Dapodi, Phugewadi, Kasarwadi, Nashik Phata, Vallabh Nagar, Kharalwadi Corner, Pimpri Chowk, PCMC, Chinchwad Station, Kalbhor Nagar, Akurdi Chowk, Nigdi	Katraj & Nigdi	
43	Katraj	Nigdi Bhakti Shakti	Ambegaon, Navale Bridge, Vadgaon Bridge, Warje, Chandni Chowk, Bavdhan, Sutarwadi, Girme Park, Radha Chowk Baner, Balewadi Stadium, Wakad Bridge, Bhumkar Chowk, Dange Chowk, Chaphekar Chowk, Chinchwad Station, Kalbhor Nagar, Akurdi Chowk, Nigdi	Katraj & Nigdi	
43A	Katraj	Hinjewadi Phase 3	Ambegaon, Navale Bridge, Vadgaon Bridge, Warje, Chandni Chowk, Bavdhan, Sutarwadi, Girme Park, Radha Chowk Baner, Balewadi Stadium, Wakad Bridge, Infosys Phase 1, Wipro Circle, Hinjewadi Phase 2, Gangaramwadi Circle	Maan-Hinjewadi & Katraj	
44	Katraj	Akurdi Railway Station	Ambegaon, Navale Bridge, Vadgaon Bridge, Warje, Chandni Chowk, Bavdhan, Sutarwadi, Girme Park, Radha Chowk Baner, Balewadi Stadium, Wakad Bridge, Bhumkar Chowk, Dange Chowk, Chaphekar Chowk, Chinchwad Gaon, Walhekarwadi, Bijli Nagar, Pradhikaran	Nigdi	
46	Swargate	Wagholi	Shanipar, ABC, Manapa, Shivaji Nagar, Patil Estate, Wakdewadi, Mula Road, Deccan College, Phule Nagar, Vishrantwadi, Bhairav Nagar, Dhanori, Lohegaon, Dadachi Padal, Diamond Waterpark, Kesnand Phata	Swargate	
47	Swargate	Sanaswadi	Dandekar Pul, Panmala, Sinhgad Road, Vitthalwadi, Anand Nagar, Vadgaon Bridge, Dhayari Phata, Nanded Phata, Kirkatwadi, Wanjalewadi, Nandoshi	Swargate	
50	Shaniwar Wada	Sinhgad Paytha	Vasant Talkies, Mandai, Swargate, Laxmi Narayan Talkies, Dandekar Pul, Panmala, Sinhgad Road, Vitthalwadi, Anand Nagar, Vadgaon Bridge, Dhayari Phata, Nanded Phata, Kirkatwadi, Kolhewadi, Khadakwasla Dam, Gorhe Budruk, Donaje Phata, Donaje Gaon	Swargate	
50A	Swargate	Sinhgad Paytha	Dandekar Pul, Panmala, Sinhgad Road, Vitthalwadi, Anand Nagar, Vadgaon Bridge, Dhayari Phata, Nanded Phata, Kirkatwadi, Kolhewadi, Khadakwasla Dam, Gorhe Budruk, Donaje Phata, Donaje Gaon	Swargate	
50K	Aundh Gaon	Sinhgad Paytha	Parihar Chowk, Sanewadi ITI, Baner Phata, Sakal Nagar, University Gate, Chatushrungi, SB Road, Symbiosis College, Nalstop, Karve Road, Kothrud Stand, Karve Nagar, Galinde Path, Warje Malwadi, Shivane, Uttam Nagar, Kondhwa Gate, Khadakwasla Gaon, Khadakwasla Dam, Gorhe Budruk, Donaje Phata, Donaje Gaon	Na.Ta.Wadi	
50N	Nigdi Bhakti Shakti	Sinhgad Paytha	Nigdi, Akurdi Chowk, Bhoir Nagar, Chaphekar Chowk, Dange Chowk, Bhumkar Chowk, Wakad Bridge, Balewadi Depot, Radha Chowk Baner, Girme Park, Sutarwadi, Bavdhan, Chandni Chowk, Warje Highway, Vadgaon Bridge, Navale Bridge, Vadgaon Bridge, Dhayari Phata, Nanded Phata, Kirkatwadi, Kolhewadi, Khadakwasla Dam, Gorhe Budruk, Donaje Phata, Donaje Gaon	Nigdi	
51	Shivaji Nagar	Dhayari DSK Vishwa	JM Road, Deccan, Alka Talkies, Ganjavewadi, Lokmanya Nagar, Navi Peth, Dattawadi, Sinhgad Road, Vitthalwadi, Anand Nagar, Vadgaon Bridge, Dhayari Phata, Garmal, Dhayari Gaon, Chavan Nagar	Na.Ta.Wadi	
51A	Shivaji Nagar	Dhayareshwar Mandir (Dhayari)	Manapa Bhavan, JM Road, Deccan, Alka Talkies, Ganjavewadi, Lokmanya Nagar, Navi Peth, Dattawadi, Sinhgad Road, Vitthalwadi, Anand Nagar, Vadgaon Bridge, Dhayari Phata, Garmal, Dhayari Gaon, Chavan Nagar	Na.Ta.Wadi	
52	Swargate	Khanapur	Dandekar Pul, Panmala, Sinhgad Road, Vitthalwadi, Anand Nagar, Vadgaon Bridge, Dhayari Phata, Nanded Phata, Kirkatwadi, Kolhewadi, Khadakwasla Dam, Gorhe Budruk, Donaje Phata, Gorhe Khurd	Swargate	
52A	Swargate	Panshet (Varasgaon)	Dandekar Pul, Panmala, Sinhgad Road, Vitthalwadi, Anand Nagar, Vadgaon Bridge, Dhayari Phata, Nanded Phata, Kirkatwadi, Kolhewadi, Khadakwasla Dam, Gorhe Budruk, Donaje Phata, Gorhe Khurd, Khanapur, Manerwadi Phata, Malkhed, Osade Phata, Sonapur, Rulegaon, Kuran Gaon, Velhe Phata, Panshet Gaon, Goradwadi	Swargate	
52C	Swargate	Osade Phata	Dandekar Pul, Panmala, Sinhgad Road, Vitthalwadi, Anand Nagar, Vadgaon Bridge, Dhayari Phata, Nanded Phata, Kirkatwadi, Kolhewadi, Khadakwasla Dam, Gorhe Budruk, Donaje Phata, Gorhe Khurd, Khanapur, Manerwadi Phata, Malkhed	Swargate	
52D	Swargate	Ranjane Khamgaon	Dandekar Pul, Panmala, Sinhgad Road, Vitthalwadi, Anand Nagar, Vadgaon Bridge, Dhayari Phata, Nanded Phata, Kirkatwadi, Kolhewadi, Khadakwasla Dam, Gorhe Budruk, Donaje Phata, Gorhe Khurd, Khanapur, Manerwadi Phata, Malkhed, Kharmari, Vardade, Kondgaon, Ambed Phata	Swargate	
55	Shanipar	Suncity Society	Laxmi Road, Alka Talkies, Ganjavewadi, Navi Peth, Dattawadi, Sinhgad Road, Vitthalwadi, Anand Nagar, Nimbaj Nagar	Swargate	
57	Pune Station	Vadgaon Budruk	Somwar Peth, Apollo Talkies, Phadke Haud, Budhwar Peth, City Post, Laxmi Road, Alka Talkies, Ganjavewadi, Navi Peth, Dattawadi, Sinhgad Road, Vitthalwadi, Anand Nagar	Swargate	
57B	Pune Station	Suncity Society	Somwar Peth, Apollo Talkies, Phadke Haud, Budhwar Peth, City Post, Laxmi Road, Alka Talkies, Ganjavewadi, Navi Peth, Dattawadi, Sinhgad Road, Vitthalwadi, Anand Nagar, Nimbaj Nagar	Pune Station	
58	Shanipar	Gokhale Nagar	Laxmi Road, Alka Talkies, Deccan, Goodluck Chowk, Bhandarkar Road, Symbiosis College, Vetal Baba Chowk, Kusalkar Putala	Swargate	
59	Shanipar	Niljyoti Society	Laxmi Road, Alka Talkies, Deccan, Goodluck Chowk, Bhandarkar Road, Symbiosis College, Vetal Baba Chowk, Kusalkar Putala, Janwadi	Swargate	
60	Swargate	Ghule Nagar	Dandekar Pul, Panmala, Sinhgad Road, Vitthalwadi, Anand Nagar, Vadgaon Budruk, Shivaji Putala	Swargate	
61	Katraj	Sarola	Gujarwadi PMT Stand, Mangdewadi, Bhilarewadi, Katraj Ghat, Khed Shivapur, Shivapur Dargah, Varve, Kelawade, Nasrapur Phata, Kapurhol, Kikvi	Katraj	
62	Upper Depot	Sangamwadi	Bibwewadi, Vasantbaug, Gangadham Chowk, Marketyard, Gultekdi, Apsara Talkies, Ramoshi Gate, Nana Peth, Rasta Peth, Somwar Peth, Pune Station, Bund Garden	Upper	
64	Hadapsar	Warje Malwadi	Ramtekdi, Fatima Nagar, Pulgate, Golibar Maidan, Swargate, Tilak Road, Alka Talkies, Deccan Corner, Garware College, Nalstop, Karve Road, Kothrud Stand, Karve Nagar, Galinde Path	Hadapsar	
64A	Shewalewadi	Aditya Garden City	Manjari Phata, Hadapsar, Ramtekdi, Fatima Nagar, Pulgate, Golibar Maidan, Swargate, Tilak Road, Alka Talkies, Deccan Corner, Garware College, Nalstop, Karve Road, Kothrud Stand, Karve Nagar, Galinde Path, Warje Bridge, Sai Sayaji Nagar, Rahul Park	Shewalewadi	
64B	Bhekrainagar	NDA Gate	Hadapsar, Ramtekdi, Fatima Nagar, Pulgate, Golibar Maidan, Swargate, Tilak Road, Alka Talkies, Deccan Corner, Garware College, Nalstop, Karve Road, Kothrud Stand, Karve Nagar, Galinde Path, Warje Malwadi, Shivane, Uttam Nagar, Kondhwa Gate	Bhekrainagar	
65A	Hadapsar	Patas	Manjari Phata, Shewalewadi, Loni Kalbhor, Theur Phata, Kunjirwadi, Sortapwadi, Uruli Kanchan, Mhetre Vasti, Sahajpur Phata, Kasurdi Phata, Yavat, Bhandgaon, Wakhari, Chouphula, Varvand	Hadapsar	
66	Marketyard	Aglambe Gaon	Gultekdi, Swargate, Dandekar Pul, Nilayam Talkies, Lokmanya Nagar, Ganjavewadi, Alka Talkies, Deccan Corner, Garware College, Nalstop, Karve Road, Kothrud Stand, Karve Nagar, Galinde Path, Warje Malwadi, Shivane, Uttam Nagar, Kondhwa Gate, NDA Gate, Kudje, Khadakwasla Dam	Upper	
67	Hadapsar	Uruli Kanchan	Manjari Phata, Shewalewadi, Loni Kalbhor, Theur Phata, Kunjirwadi, Sortapwadi	Hadapsar	
67A	Swargate	Uruli Kanchan	Golibar Maidan, Pulgate, Fatima Nagar, Ramtekdi, Hadapsar, Manjari Phata, Shewalewadi, Loni Kalbhor, Theur Phata, Kunjirwadi, Sortapwadi	Hadapsar	
67B	Hadapsar	Mhatobachi Alandi	Hadapsar, Manjari Phata, Shewalewadi, Loni Kalbhor, Theur Phata, Kunjirwadi	Hadapsar	
68	Upper Depot	Sutardara	Bibwewadi, Vasantbaug, Bhapkar Petrol Pump, Swargate, Shanipar, Laxmi Road, Alka Talkies, Deccan Corner, Garware College, Nalstop, Paud Road, Anand Nagar, Shivtirth Nagar	Upper	
69	Marketyard	Ghotawade Gaon	Gultekdi, Swargate, Dandekar Pul, Nilayam Talkies, Lokmanya Nagar, Ganjavewadi, Alka Talkies, Deccan Corner, Garware College, Nalstop, Paud Road, Anand Nagar, Vanaz, Kothrud Depot, Chandni Chowk, Bhagvat Vasti, Bhugaon, Bhukum, Pirangut, Ghotawade Phata, Bhare Phata	Upper	
70	Marketyard	Mulshi Gaon	Gultekdi, Swargate, Dandekar Pul, Nilayam Talkies, Lokmanya Nagar, Ganjavewadi, Alka Talkies, Deccan Corner, Garware College, Nalstop, Paud Road, Anand Nagar, Vanaz, Kothrud Depot, Chandni Chowk, Bhagvat Vasti, Bhugaon, Bhukum, Pirangut, Ghotawade Phata, Sutarwadi, Kasar Amboli, Darawali, Paud Gaon, Kondhawale Phata, Kalamshet, Shileshwar, Jamgaon, Disli, Male Gaon, Shedani Phata	Upper	
71	Kothrud Depot	Upper Depot	Vanaz, Anand Nagar, Paud Road, Nalstop, Garware College, Deccan Corner, Tilak Road, Swargate, Bhapkar Petrol Pump, Vasantbaug, Bibwewadi	Kothrud	
72	Upper Depot	NDA Gate	Bibwewadi, Vasantbaug, Bhapkar Petrol Pump, Swargate, Tilak Road, Deccan Corner, Garware College, Nalstop, Karve Road, Kothrud Stand, Karve Nagar, Galinde Path, Warje Malwadi, Shivane, Uttam Nagar, Kondhwa Gate	Upper	
73	Hadapsar	Khamgaon	Manjari Phata, Shewalewadi, Loni Kalbhor, Theur Phata, Kunjirwadi, Uruli Kanchan, Mhetre Vasti, Sahajpur Phata, Sahajpur, Nandur Gaon	Hadapsar	
74	Chinchwad Gaon	Paud Gaon	Chaphekar Chowk, Dange Chowk, Bhumkar Chowk, Hinjewadi Chowk, Infosys Phase 1, Hinjewadi Phase 2, Wipro Circle, Gangaramwadi Circle, Hinjewadi Phase 3, Godambewadi, Shelkewadi, Bhare Phata, Ghotawade Phata, Pirangut, Sutarwadi, Kasar Amboli, Darawali	Balewadi	
76	Manapa Bhavan	Galinde Path	JM Road, Deccan, Garware College, Nalstop, Karve Road, Kothrud Stand, Karve Nagar	Kothrud	
77	Hinjewadi Ph. 3	Warje Malwadi	Gangaramwadi Circle, Wipro Circle, Hinjewadi Phase 2, Mezza Nine, Wakad Bridge, Balewadi Depot, Radha Chowk Baner, Girme Park, Sutarwadi, Bavdhan, Chandni Chowk, Kothrud Depot, Vanaz, Anand Nagar, Paud Road, Nalstop, Karve Road, Kothrud Stand, Karve Nagar, Galinde Path	Maan-Hinjewadi	
78	Marketyard	NDA Gate	Gultekdi, Swargate, Tilak Road, Alka Talkies, Deccan Corner, Garware College, Erandwane, Mehendale Garage, Alankar Chowki, Sahwas Society, Karve Nagar, Galinde Path, Warje Malwadi, Shivane, Uttam Nagar, Kondhwa Gate	Upper	
79	Hinjewadi Ph. 3	Deccan Gymkhana	Gangaramwadi Circle, Wipro Circle, Hinjewadi Phase 2, Mezza Nine, Wakad Bridge, Balewadi Depot, Radha Chowk Baner, Girme Park, Sutarwadi, Bavdhan, Chandni Chowk, Kothrud Depot, Vanaz, Anand Nagar, Paud Road, Nalstop, Garware College, Goodluck Chowk	Maan-Hinjewadi	
80	Manapa Bhavan	Aditya Garden City Warje	JM Road, Deccan, Garware College, Nalstop, Karve Road, Kothrud Stand, Karve Nagar, Galinde Path, Warje Bridge, Sai Sayaji Nagar, Rahul Park	Kothrud	
81	Pune Station	Kumbare Park	Somwar Peth, Apollo Talkies, Phadke Haud, Budhwar Peth, City Post, Laxmi Road, Alka Talkies, Deccan Corner, Garware College, Nalstop, Paud Road, Anand Nagar, Vanaz, Shastri Nagar	Kothrud	
82(RING)	Manapa Bhavan	NDA Gate -> Manapa Bhavan	JM Road, Deccan, Garware College, Nalstop, Karve Road, Kothrud Stand, Karve Nagar, Galinde Path, Warje Malwadi, Shivane, Uttam Nagar, Kondhwa Gate, NDA Gate, Kondhwa Gate, Uttam Nagar, Shivane, Warje Malwadi, Galinde Path, Karve Nagar, Kothrud Stand, Karve Road, Nalstop, Garware College, Deccan, FC Road, Modern College	Kothrud	
83	NDA Gate	Alandi	Kondhwa Gate, Uttam Nagar, Shivane, Warje Malwadi, Galinde Path, Karve Nagar, Kothrud Stand, Karve Road, Nalstop, Garware College, Deccan, FC Road, Modern College, Manapa Bhavan, Shivaji Nagar, Patil Estate, Wakdewadi, Mula Road, Deccan College, Phule Nagar, Vishrantwadi, Kalas, Dighi, Magazine Chowk, Sai Mandir, Charholi Phata	Kothrud	
84	Deccan Gymkhana	Mutha Gaon	Garware College, Nalstop, Karve Road, Kothrud Stand, Karve Nagar, Galinde Path, Warje Malwadi, Shivane, Uttam Nagar, Kondhwa Gate, NDA Gate, Kudje, Khadakwasla Dam, Khadakwadi, Mandvi, Sangrun, Katawadi, Bahuli, Kondhur Phata, Jatede	Kothrud	
84A	Deccan Gymkhana	Sangrun	Garware College, Nalstop, Karve Road, Kothrud Stand, Karve Nagar, Galinde Path, Warje Malwadi, Shivane, Uttam Nagar, Kondhwa Gate, NDA Gate, Kudje, Khadakwasla Dam, Khadakwadi, Mandvi	Kothrud	
85	Manapa Bhavan	Khadewadi (Ahire)	JM Road, Deccan, Garware College, Nalstop, Karve Road, Kothrud Stand, Karve Nagar, Galinde Path, Warje Malwadi, Shivane, Uttam Nagar, Kondhwa Gate, NDA Gate, Garrisson Engineering, Ahire Gaon, Mohkarwadi	Kothrud	
86	Deccan Gymkhana	Paud ST Stand	Garware College, Nalstop, Paud Road, Anand Nagar, Vanaz, Kothrud Depot, Chandni Chowk, Bhagvat Vasti, Bhugaon, Bhukum, Pirangut, Ghotawade Phata, Sutarwadi, Kasar Amboli, Ambadvet, Darawali	Kothrud	
87	Deccan Gymkhana	Sutarwadi Pashan	Goodluck Chowk, FC Road, Modern College, Manapa Bhavan, Shivaji Nagar, Mhasoba Gate, University Gate, NCL, Pashan, Sai Chowk, Shiv Nagar	Balewadi	
87A	Deccan Gymkhana	Chande Gaon	Goodluck Chowk, FC Road, Modern College, Manapa Bhavan, Shivaji Nagar, Mhasoba Gate, University Gate, NCL, Pashan, Sai Chowk, Sus Gaon, Nande Gaon	Balewadi	
87B	Deccan Gymkhana	Sutarwadi Pashan	Goodluck Chowk, FC Road, Modern College, Manapa Bhavan, Shivaji Nagar, Mhasoba Gate, University Gate, NCL, Pashan, Bhagwati Nagar	Balewadi	
87D	Deccan Gymkhana	Symbiosis University Lavale	Goodluck Chowk, FC Road, Modern College, Manapa Bhavan, Shivaji Nagar, Mhasoba Gate, University Gate, NCL, Pashan, Sai Chowk, Sus Gaon	Balewadi	
90	Katraj	Gokhale Nagar	Balaji Nagar, Padmavati, Natubaug, Bhapkar Petrol Pump, Swargate, Tilak Road, Alka Talkies, Deccan, FC Road, Model Colony, Deep Bangla Chowk, Vetal Baba Chowk, Kusalkar Putala	Katraj	
91	Manapa Bhavan	Ishan Nagari	JM Road, Deccan, Garware College, Nalstop, Karve Road, Kothrud Stand, Karve Nagar, Galinde Path	Kothrud	
92	Kothrud Depot	Venutai Chavan College (Vadgaon Budruk)	Vanaz, Anand Nagar, Paud Road, Nalstop, Garware College, Deccan Corner, Alka Talkies, Ganjavewadi, Lokmanya Nagar, Dandekar Pul, Panmala, Sinhgad Road, Vitthalwadi, Anand Nagar, Vadgaon Budruk	Kothrud	
94	Pune Station	Bhukum	Somwar Peth, Phadke Haud, Jijamata Udyan, Vasant Talkies, ABC, Narayan Peth, Alka Talkies, Deccan Corner, Garware College, Nalstop, Paud Road, Anand Nagar, Vanaz, Kothrud Depot, Chandni Chowk, Bhagvat Vasti, Bhugaon, Tangde Mala	Kothrud	
95	Deccan Gymkhana	PVPIT College Bavdhan	Garware College, Nalstop, Paud Road, Anand Nagar, Vanaz, Kothrud Depot, Chandni Chowk, Kokate Vasti	Kothrud	
96	Swargate	Jambhali-Davaje (Nilkantheshwar Paytha)	Dandekar Pul, Panmala, Sinhgad Road, Vitthalwadi, Anand Nagar, Vadgaon Bridge, Navale Bridge, Daulat Nagar, Warje Bridge, Warje Malwadi, Shivane, Uttam Nagar, Kondhwa Gate, NDA Gate, Kudje, Khadakwasla Dam, Khadakwadi, Mandvi, Sangrun Phata, Davaje Phata, Davaje Gaon, Jambhali	Swargate	
97	Warje Malwadi	Sahakar Nagar	Galinde Path, Karve Nagar, Kothrud Stand, Karve Road, Nalstop, Garware College, Deccan Corner, Alka Talkies, Tilak Road, Swargate, Laxmi Narayan Talkies, Dashbhuja Ganpati	Kothrud	
98	Warje Malwadi	Wagholi	Galinde Path, Karve Nagar, Kothrud Stand, Karve Road, Nalstop, Garware College, Deccan, FC Road, Modern College, Manapa Bhavan, Gadital Juna Bazar, Pune Station, Bund Garden, Yerwada, Shastri Nagar, Ramwadi, Viman Nagar, Chandan Nagar, Kharadi Bypass, Aaple Ghar, Khandve Nagar, Kesnand Phata	Kothrud & Wagholi	
98B	Manapa Bhavan	Wagholi	Gadital Juna Bazar, Pune Station, Bund Garden, Yerwada, Shastri Nagar, Ramwadi, Viman Nagar, Chandan Nagar, Kharadi Bypass, Aaple Ghar, Khandve Nagar, Kesnand Phata	Na.Ta.Wadi	
99	Kothrud Depot	Vishrantwadi	Vanaz, Anand Nagar, Paud Road, Nalstop, Garware College, Deccan, FC Road, Modern College, Manapa Bhavan, Shivaji Nagar, Sangamwadi, Deccan College, Phule Nagar	Kothrud	
99B	Kothrud Depot	Vishrantwadi	Vanaz, Anand Nagar, Paud Road, Nalstop, Garware College, Deccan, FC Road, Modern College, Manapa Bhavan, Shivaji Nagar, Patil Estate, Wakdewadi, Mula Road, Deccan College, Phule Nagar	Kothrud	
100	Manapa Bhavan	Hinjewadi Phase 3	Shivaji Nagar, Mhasoba Gate, University Gate, Bremen Chowk, Aundh, Sangvi Phata, Rakshak Chowk, Wakad Phata, Vishal Nagar, Mankar Chowk, Wakad, Wakad Bridge, Hinjewadi Chowk, Infosys Phase 1, Wipro Circle, Infosys Phase 2, Gangaramwadi Circle	Na.Ta.Wadi & Balewadi	
100A	Manapa Bhavan	Blue Ridge Society	Shivaji Nagar, Mhasoba Gate, University Gate, Bremen Chowk, Aundh, Sangvi Phata, Rakshak Chowk, Wakad Phata, Vishal Nagar, Mankar Chowk, Wakad, Wakad Bridge, Hinjewadi Chowk, Infosys Phase 1	Na.Ta.Wadi	
101	Deccan Gymkhana	Yewalewadi	Alka Talkies, Tilak Road, Swargate, Bhapkar Petrol Pump, Gultekdi, Marketyard, Gangadham Chowk, Lulla Nagar, Kamela, Kausarbaug, Kondhwa Khurd, Somji Chowk, Khadi Machine Chowk	Swargate	
103	Katraj	Kothrud Depot	Balaji Nagar, Padmavati, Natubaug, Bhapkar Petrol Pump, Swargate, Tilak Road, Alka Talkies, Deccan Corner, Garware College, Nalstop, Paud Road, Anand Nagar, Vanaz	Kothrud & Katraj	
104	Shivaji Nagar	Dhayari DSK Vishwa	JM Road, Deccan, Garware College, Nalstop, Karve Road, Kothrud Stand, Karve Nagar, Sahwas Society, Rajaram Pul, Sinhgad Road, Anand Nagar, Vadgaon Bridge, Dhayari Phata, Garmal, Dhayari Gaon, Chavan Nagar	Na.Ta.Wadi	
104A	Shivaji Nagar	Suncity Society	JM Road, Deccan, Garware College, Nalstop, Karve Road, Kothrud Stand, Karve Nagar, Sahwas Society, Rajaram Pul, Sinhgad Road, Anand Nagar, Nimbaj Nagar	Na.Ta.Wadi	
105	Manapa Bhavan	Balewadi Stadium Metro Station	Shivaji Nagar, Mhasoba Gate, University Gate, Sakal Nagar, Baner Phata, Sanewadi ITI, Parihar Chowk, DP Road, The Spires Society, Jupiter Hospital, Chakankar Mala, Balewadi Gaon, Moze Vidyalaya, Balewadi Depot, Radha Chowk	Na.Ta.Wadi	
106	Deccan Gymkhana	Narhe Gaon	Garware College, Erandwane, Mehendale Garage, Alankar Police Chowki, Rajaram Pul, Sinhgad Road, Vitthalwadi, Anand Nagar, Vadgaon Bridge, Dhayari Phata, Manaji Nagar	Na.Ta.Wadi	
107	Warje Malwadi	Pimple Gurav	Galinde Path, Karve Nagar, Kothrud Stand, Karve Road, Nalstop, Garware College, Deccan, FC Road, Modern College, Manapa Bhavan, Shivaji Nagar, Mhasoba Gate, Bhosale Nagar, Range Hills, Khadki Station, Bopodi, Dapodi	Kothrud	
108	Pune Station	Sutardara	Somwar Peth, Phadke Haud, Vasant Talkies, ABC, Narayan Peth, Alka Talkies, Deccan Corner, Garware College, Nalstop, Paud Road, Anand Nagar, Shivtirth Nagar	Kothrud	
109 (RING)	Manapa Bhavan	Manapa Bhavan	Shivaji Nagar, Mhasoba Gate, University Gate, NCL, Pashan, ARDE Colony, Ram Nagar, Bavdhan, Chandni Chowk, Kothrud Depot, Vanaz, Anand Nagar, Paud Road, Nalstop, Garware College, Deccan, FC Road, Modern College	Kothrud	
110 (RING)	Manapa Bhavan	Manapa Bhavan	JM Road, Deccan, Garware College, Nalstop, Paud Road, Anand Nagar, Vanaz, Kothrud Depot, Chandni Chowk, Bavdhan, Ram Nagar, ARDE Colony, Pashan, NCL, University Gate, Mhasoba Gate, Shivaji Nagar	Kothrud	
111	Manapa Bhavan	Bhekrainagar	JM Road, Deccan, Alka Talkies, Ganjavewadi, Lokmanya Nagar, Dandekar Pul, Swargate, Golibar Maidan, Pulgate, Fatima Nagar, Ramtekdi, Hadapsar	Hadapsar	
113	Vasant Talkies (ABC)	Sangvi	Shaniwar Wada, Manapa, Shivaji Nagar, Mhasoba Gate, University Gate, Bremen Chowk, Aundh, Sangvi Phata, BG College, Juni Sangvi	Na.Ta.Wadi	
114	Manapa Bhavan	Mahalunge (Padale Chowk)	Shivaji Nagar, Mhasoba Gate, University Gate, Sakal Nagar, Baner Phata, Baner Gaon, Balewadi Phata, Radha Chowk, Mahalunge Stadium	Baner	
115	Pune Station	Hinjewadi Phase 3	Gadital Juna Bazar, Manapa Bhavan, Shivaji Nagar, Mhasoba Gate, University Gate, Bremen Chowk, Aundh, Sangvi Phata, Rakshak Chowk, Jagtap Dairy, Kalewadi Phata, Dange Chowk, Bhumkar Chowk, Hinjewadi Gaon, Infosys Phase 1, Wipro Circle, Infosys Phase 2, Gangaramwadi Circle	Maan-Hinjewadi	
117	Swargate	Dhayari Maruti Mandir	Dandekar Pul, Panmala, Sinhgad Road, Vitthalwadi, Anand Nagar, Vadgaon Bridge, Dhayari Phata, Garmal, Dhayari Gaon, Benkar Nagar, Raikar Mala	Swargate	
117B	Swargate	Raikar Mala	Dandekar Pul, Panmala, Sinhgad Road, Vitthalwadi, Anand Nagar, Vadgaon Bridge, Dhayari Phata, Garmal, Dhayari Gaon, Benkar Nagar	Swargate	
117D	Swargate	Jadhav Nagar (Dhayari)	Dandekar Pul, Panmala, Sinhgad Road, Vitthalwadi, Anand Nagar, Vadgaon Bridge, Dhayari Phata, Garmal, Dhayari Gaon, Benkar Nagar, Chavanbaug, Dalvewadi	Swargate	
118	Swargate	Vadgaon Budruk	Dandekar Pul, Panmala, Sinhgad Road, Vitthalwadi, Anand Nagar	Swargate	
118A	Swargate	Suncity Society	Dandekar Pul, Panmala, Sinhgad Road, Vitthalwadi, Anand Nagar, Nimbaj Nagar	Swargate	
118B	Swargate	Venutai Chavan College (Vadgaon Budruk)	Dandekar Pul, Panmala, Sinhgad Road, Vitthalwadi, Anand Nagar, Vadgaon Budruk	Swargate	
118C	Swargate	Bageshree Society	Dandekar Pul, Panmala, Sinhgad Road, Vitthalwadi, Anand Nagar, Vadgaon Bridge, Dhayari Phata, Nanded Gaon, Nanded City	Swargate	
118D	Swargate	Charwad Vasti	Dandekar Pul, Panmala, Sinhgad Road, Vitthalwadi, Anand Nagar, Vadgaon Budruk, Tukai Nagar, Sinhagad College	Swargate	
119	Manapa Bhavan	Alandi	Shivaji Nagar, Patil Estate, Wakdewadi, Mula Road, Deccan College, Phule Nagar, Vishrantwadi, Kalas, Dighi, Magazine Chowk, Sai Mandir, Charholi Phata	Na.Ta.Wadi	
119A	Manapa Bhavan	Charholi	Shivaji Nagar, Patil Estate, Wakdewadi, Mula Road, Deccan College, Phule Nagar, Vishrantwadi, Kalas, Dighi, Magazine Chowk, Sai Mandir, Charholi Phata, Dabhade Vasti	Na.Ta.Wadi	
120	Bhosari	Mahalunge MIDC	Sadgurunagar, Gandharv Nagari, Moshi Marketyard, Moshi, Chimbali Phata, Kurali, Alandi Phata, Chakan, Talegaon Chowk, Kharabwadi, Talkhed, Lumax Company, Mahalunge Ingale, Endurance Company	Pimpri	
121	Manapa Bhavan	Bhosari	Shivaji Nagar, Patil Estate, Wakdewadi, Khadki, Bopodi, Dapodi, Phugewadi, Kasarwadi, Nashik Phata, Bhosari MIDC, Landewadi	Bhosari	
122	Manapa Bhavan	Chinchwad Gaon	Shivaji Nagar, Patil Estate, Wakdewadi, Khadki, Bopodi, Dapodi, Phugewadi, Kasarwadi, Nashik Phata, Vallabh Nagar, Kharalwadi Corner, Pimpri Road, Bhat Nagar, Link Road	Pimpri	
123	Manapa Bhavan	Nigdi Bhakti Shakti	Shivaji Nagar, Patil Estate, Wakdewadi, Khadki, Bopodi, Dapodi, Phugewadi, Kasarwadi, Nashik Phata, Vallabh Nagar, Kharalwadi Corner, Pimpri Road, PCMC, Chinchwad Station, Kalbhor Nagar, Akurdi Chowk, Nigdi	Nigdi & Na.Ta.Wadi	
124	Aundh Gaon	Neilsoft Company (Hinjewadi Ph.3)	Parihar Chowk, Sanewadi ITI, Baner Phata, Baner Gaon, Balewadi Phata, Radha Chowk, Balewadi Stadium, Wakad Bridge, Hinjewadi Chowk, Infosys Phase 1, Wipro Circle, Infosys Phase 2, Gangaramwadi Circle	Maan-Hinjewadi	
126	Pimple Nilakh	Bopkhel	Rakshak Chowk, Sangvi Phata, Aundh, Bremen Chowk, Spicer College, Bhau Patil Chowk, Bopodi, Khadki Bazar, Khadki Cantonment, Mula House, Tank Road, Vishrantwadi, Ganesh Nagar	Na.Ta.Wadi	
126A	Khadki Bazar	Bopkhel	Khadki Cantonment, Mula House, Tank Road, Vishrantwadi, Ganesh Nagar	Na.Ta.Wadi	
126D	Pimple Nilakh	Khadki Bazar	Rakshak Chowk, Sangvi Phata, Aundh, Bremen Chowk, Spicer College, Bhau Patil Chowk, Bopodi	Na.Ta.Wadi	
126E	Sangvi	Bopkhel	Dapodi ST Workshop, Dapodi, Bopodi, Khadki Bazar, Khadki Cantonment, Mula House, Tank Road, Vishrantwadi, Ganesh Nagar	Na.Ta.Wadi	
128	Pune Station	Hadapsar Railway Station	Bund Garden, Mira Nagar, Koregaon Park, Kavadewadi, Tadigutta, Dhayarkar Colony	Hadapsar	
130	Swargate	Narhe Gaon	Bhapkar Petrol Pump, Natubaug, Padmavati, Balaji Nagar, Katraj, Santosh Nagar, Datta Nagar, Ambegaon, Bhumkar Nagar	Katraj	
130B	Swargate	Paranjape Society Dhayari	Bhapkar Petrol Pump, Natubaug, Padmavati, Balaji Nagar, Katraj, Santosh Nagar, Datta Nagar, Ambegaon, Bhumkar Nagar, Narhe Gaon, Shree Control	Katraj	
131	Manapa Bhavan	Golegaon	Gadital Juna Bazar, Pune Station, Bund Garden, Yerwada, Netaji High School, Nagpur Chawl, 509 Chowk, Lohegaon Air Force Station, Lohegaon, Moze Chawl, Pathare Vasti, Marathwada Institute, Gulabhari Vasti, Vadgaon Shinde, Pimpalgaon	Na.Ta.Wadi	
132	Manapa Bhavan	Shubham Society	Gadital Juna Bazar, Pune Station, Bund Garden, Yerwada, Shastri Nagar, Ramwadi, Viman Nagar, Somnath Nagar	Na.Ta.Wadi	
133	Manapa Bhavan	Anand Park	Gadital Juna Bazar, Pune Station, Bund Garden, Yerwada, Shastri Nagar, Ramwadi, Viman Nagar, Chandan Nagar, Sunita Nagar	Na.Ta.Wadi	
133A	Manapa Bhavan	Columbia Hospital	Gadital Juna Bazar, Pune Station, Bund Garden, Yerwada, Shastri Nagar, Ramwadi, Viman Nagar, Chandan Nagar, Sunita Nagar, Sainath Nagar, Bidi Kamgar Colony	Na.Ta.Wadi	
135	Manapa Bhavan	Ranjangaon Sandas	Gadital Juna Bazar, Pune Station, Bund Garden, Yerwada, Shastri Nagar, Ramwadi, Viman Nagar, Chandan Nagar, Kharadi Bypass, Aaple Ghar, Khandve Nagar, Kesnand Phata, Wagholi, Kesnand Gaon, Wadebolhai, Ashtapur, Shindewadi, Sanghavi Phata, Deokarwadi, Pilanwadi, Rahu Gaon, Thorli Vihir, Walki Gaon, Chormale Wada	Na.Ta.Wadi	
136	Wagholi	Wadegaon	Kesnand Gaon, Wadegaon Phata, Bolhaimata Chowk, Pathare Vasti	Wagholi	
137	Manapa Bhavan	Pargaon Salumalu	Gadital Juna Bazar, Pune Station, Bund Garden, Yerwada, Shastri Nagar, Ramwadi, Viman Nagar, Chandan Nagar, Kharadi Bypass, Aaple Ghar, Khandve Nagar, Kesnand Phata, Wagholi, Kesnand Gaon, Wadebolhai, Ashtapur, Shindewadi, Sanghavi Phata, Deokarwadi, Pilanwadi, Rahu Gaon, Pimpalgaon, Delawadi	Na.Ta.Wadi	
138	Wagholi	Bakori Gaon	Bakori Phata, Ramchandra College, Magar Vasti, Weikfield Company	Hadapsar	
138A	Hadapsar	Bakori Gaon	Magarpatta, Mundhwa, Kharadi Bypass, Aaple Ghar, Khandve Nagar, Kesnand Phata, Wagholi, Bakori Phata, Ramchandra College, Magar Vasti, Weikfield Company	Hadapsar	
139	Shewalewadi	Nigdi Bhakti Shakti	Manjari Phata, Hadapsar, Ramtekdi, Fatima Nagar, Pulgate, Westend, Pune Station, RTO Office, Patil Estate, Wakdewadi, Khadki, Bopodi, Dapodi, Phugewadi, Kasarwadi, Nashik Phata, Vallabh Nagar, Kharalwadi Corner, Pimpri Road, PCMC, Chinchwad Station, Kalbhor Nagar, Akurdi Chowk, Nigdi	Nigdi	
139A	Bhekrainagar	Nigdi Bhakti Shakti	Hadapsar, Ramtekdi, Fatima Nagar, Pulgate, Westend, Pune Station, RTO Office, Patil Estate, Wakdewadi, Khadki, Bopodi, Dapodi, Phugewadi, Kasarwadi, Nashik Phata, Vallabh Nagar, Kharalwadi Corner, Pimpri Road, PCMC, Chinchwad Station, Kalbhor Nagar, Akurdi Chowk, Nigdi	Bhekrainagar	
140	Pune Station	Upper Depot	Somwar Peth, Rasta Peth, Nana Peth, Ramoshi Gate, Apsara Talkies, Gultekdi, Marketyard, Gangadham Chowk, Vasantbaug, Bibwewadi	Upper	
140A	Pune Station	Katraj	Somwar Peth, Rasta Peth, Nana Peth, Ramoshi Gate, Apsara Talkies, Gultekdi, Marketyard, Gangadham Chowk, Aai Mata Mandir, Kakade Vasti, Salve Garden, Shatrunjay Mandir, Khadi Machine Chowk, Gokul Nagar	Katraj	
141	Pune Station	Kumar Prithvi Society	Somwar Peth, Rasta Peth, Nana Peth, Ramoshi Gate, Apsara Talkies, Gultekdi, Marketyard, Gangadham Chowk, Aai Mata Mandir, Kakade Vasti	Upper	
142	Pune Station	Ghotawade Phata	Gadital Juna Bazar, Manapa Bhavan, Shivaji Nagar, Mhasoba Gate, University Gate, NCL, Pashan, Sai Chowk, Sus Gaon, Nande Gaon, Chande Gaon, Mulkhed, Bhare Phata, Pirangut	Pune Station	
142A	Pune Station	Ghotawade Gaon	Gadital Juna Bazar, Manapa Bhavan, Shivaji Nagar, Mhasoba Gate, University Gate, NCL, Pashan, Sai Chowk, Sus Gaon, Nande Gaon, Chande Gaon, Mulkhed	Pune Station	
143	Pune Station	Galinde Path	Somwar Peth, Phadke Haud, Vasant Talkies, ABC, Narayan Peth, Alka Talkies, Ganjavewadi, Navi Peth, Mhatre Pul, Mehendale Garage, Sahwas Society, Karve Nagar	Kothrud	
144	Pune Station	NDA Gate	Somwar Peth, Apollo Talkies, Phadke Haud, Budhwar Peth, City Post, Laxmi Road, Alka Talkies, Deccan Corner, Garware College, Nalstop, Karve Road, Kothrud Stand, Karve Nagar, Galinde Path, Warje Malwadi, Shivane, Uttam Nagar, Kondhwa Gate	Kothrud	
144A	Pune Station	Aditya Garden City	Somwar Peth, Apollo Talkies, Phadke Haud, Budhwar Peth, City Post, Laxmi Road, Alka Talkies, Deccan Corner, Garware College, Nalstop, Karve Road, Kothrud Stand, Karve Nagar, Galinde Path, Warje Bridge, Sai Sayaji Nagar, Rahul Park	Kothrud	
144C	Pune Station	Gujarat Colony	Somwar Peth, Apollo Talkies, Phadke Haud, Budhwar Peth, City Post, Laxmi Road, Alka Talkies, Deccan Corner, Garware College, Nalstop, Karve Road, Mayur Colony	Kothrud	
145	Pune Station	Sutarwadi Pashan	Gadital Juna Bazar, Manapa Bhavan, Shivaji Nagar, Mhasoba Gate, University Gate, NCL, Pashan, Sai Chowk, Shiv Nagar	Pune Station	
146	Pune Station	Gokhale Nagar	Gadital Juna Bazar, Manapa Bhavan, Ghole Road, Model Colony, Deep Bangla Chowk, Vetal Baba Chowk, Kusalkar Putala	Pune Station	
147	Manapa Bhavan	Nhavi Sandas	Gadital Juna Bazar, Pune Station, Bund Garden, Yerwada, Shastri Nagar, Ramwadi, Viman Nagar, Chandan Nagar, Kharadi Bypass, Aaple Ghar, Khandve Nagar, Kesnand Phata, Wagholi, Bakuri Phata, Vitthalwadi, Lonikand, Tulapur Phata, Perne Phata, Perne Gaon, Dongargaon, Burkegaon, Pimpri Sandas	Na.Ta.Wadi	
148	Shewalewadi	Pimple Gurav	Manjari Phata, Hadapsar, Ramtekdi, Fatima Nagar, Pulgate, Westend, Pune Station, Bund Garden, Yerwada, Deccan College, Khadki Cantonment, Khadki Bazar, Bopodi, Dapodi	Shewalewadi	
148A	Bhekrainagar	Bhosari	Hadapsar, Ramtekdi, Fatima Nagar, Pulgate, Westend, Pune Station, Bund Garden, Yerwada, Deccan College, Khadki Cantonment, Khadki Bazar, Bopodi, Dapodi, Pimple Gurav, Kalpataru Society, Nashik Phata, Bhosari MIDC, Landewadi	Bhosari & Hadapsar	
149	Hadapsar	Nigdi Bhakti Shakti	Magarpatta, Mundhwa, Kharadi Bypass, Chandan Nagar, Viman Nagar, Ramwadi, Yerwada, Netaji High School, Nagpur Chawl, 509 Chowk, Tingre Nagar, Vishrantwadi, Kalas, Dighi, Magazine Chowk, Shastri Chowk, Bhosari, Gavhane Vasti, Indrayani Nagar, Telco Road, KSB Chowk, Thermax Chowk, Yamuna Nagar	Hadapsar & Nigdi	
151	Pune Station	Alandi	Bund Garden, Yerwada, Deccan College, Phule Nagar, Vishrantwadi, Kalas, Dighi, MAgazine Chowk, Sai Mandir, Charholi Phata, Dehu Phata	Charholi	
152	Manapa Bhavan	Diamond Waterpark (Lohegaon)	Shivaji Nagar, Patil Estate, Wakdewadi, Mula Road, Deccan College, Phule Nagar, Vishrantwadi, Bhairav Nagar, Kamal Park, Dhanori, Lohegaon, Dadachi Padal	Na.Ta.Wadi and Wagholi	
153	Kharadi	Alandi	Patil Vasti, Bidi Kamgar Colony, Sainath Nagar, Sunita Nagar, Chandan Nagar, Viman Nagar, Ramwadi, Don Bosco High School, Yerwada, Nagpur Chawl, 509 Chowk, Tingre Nagar, Vishrantwadi, Kalas, Dighi, Magazine Chowk, Sai Mandir, Charholi Phata, Dehu Phata	Bhosari	
154	Pune Station	Diamond Waterpark (Lohegaon)	Bund Garden, Yerwada, Netaji High School, Ambedkar Society, Phule Nagar, Vishrantwadi, Bhairav Nagar, Kamal Park, Dhanori, Kalwad, Lohegaon, Dadachi Padal	Wagholi	
155	Pune Station	Diamond Waterpark (Lohegaon)	Bund Garden, Yerwada, Netaji High School, Nagpur Chawl, Yerwada Press, Commerzone IT Park, Vishrantwadi, Bhairav Nagar, Kamal Park, Dhanori, Kalwad, Lohegaon, Dadachi Padal	Wagholi	
157	Manapa Bhavan	JSPM College (Wagholi)	Gadital Juna Bazar, Pune Station, Bund Garden, Yerwada, Shastri Nagar, Ramwadi, Viman Nagar, Chandan Nagar, Kharadi Bypass, Aaple Ghar, Khandve Nagar, Kesnand Phata, Wagholi, Bakuri Phata	Na.Ta.Wadi	
158	Manapa Bhavan	Lohegaon	Gadital Juna Bazar, Pune Station, Bund Garden, Yerwada, Netaji High School, Nagpur Chawl, 509 Chowk, Lohegaon Air Force Station	Charholi	
158A	Manapa Bhavan	Diamond Waterpark (Lohegaon)	Gadital Juna Bazar, Pune Station, Bund Garden, Yerwada, Netaji High School, Nagpur Chawl, 509 Chowk, Lohegaon Air Force Station, Lohegaon, Dadachi Padal	Charholi	
159	Manapa Bhavan	Talegaon Dhamdhere	Gadital Juna Bazar, Pune Station, Bund Garden, Yerwada, Shastri Nagar, Ramwadi, Viman Nagar, Chandan Nagar, Kharadi Bypass, Aaple Ghar, Khandve Nagar, Kesnand Phata, Wagholi, Bakuri Phata, Vitthalwadi, Lonikand, Tulapur Phata, Perne Phata, Koregaon Bhima, Sanaswadi, Shikrapur, Chakan Chowk, Talegaon Dhamdhere Bazar	Na.Ta.Wadi	
159B	Manapa Bhavan	Loni Dhamani	Gadital Juna Bazar, Pune Station, Bund Garden, Yerwada, Shastri Nagar, Ramwadi, Viman Nagar, Chandan Nagar, Kharadi Bypass, Aaple Ghar, Khandve Nagar, Kesnand Phata, Wagholi, Bakuri Phata, Vitthalwadi, Lonikand, Tulapur Phata, Perne Phata, Koregaon Bhima, Sanaswadi, Shikrapur, Chakan Chowk, Pabal Phata, Jategaon, Mukhai, Dhamari, Pabal Gaon, Agarkarwadi, Thapewadi	Na.Ta.Wadi	
160	Shaniwar Wada	Manjari Budruk	Gadital Juna Bazar, Pune Station, Bund Garden, Mira Nagar, Koregaon Park, Kavadewadi, Tadigutta, Mundhwa, Keshav Nagar, Lonkar Nagar, Ghule Vasti	Hadapsar	
161	Wagholi	Karegaon	Kesnand Phata, Bakuri Phata, Vitthalwadi, Lonikand, Tulapur Phata, Perne Phata, Koregaon Bhima, Sanaswadi, Shikrapur, Chakan Chowk, Pabal Phata, Kasari, Kondhapuri, Ranjangaon, Ranjangaon MIDC	Wagholi	
161B	Karegaon	Baburao Nagar (Shirur)	Saradwadi, Nhavare Phata, Shirur ST Stand, CT Bora College, Ganga Nagar	Wagholi	
162	Manapa Bhavan	Pabal Gaon	Gadital Juna Bazar, Pune Station, Bund Garden, Yerwada, Shastri Nagar, Ramwadi, Viman Nagar, Chandan Nagar, Kharadi Bypass, Aaple Ghar, Khandve Nagar, Kesnand Phata, Wagholi, Bakuri Phata, Vitthalwadi, Lonikand, Tulapur Phata, Perne Phata, Koregaon Bhima, Wadhu Budruk, Wajewadi, Chouphula, Karandi, Parhadmala, Kendur Gaon, Thitewadi, Choudhar Bend	Na.Ta.Wadi	
163	Pune Station	Dhole Patil College (Kharadi)	Bund Garden, Yerwada, Shastri Nagar, Ramwadi, Viman Nagar, Chandan Nagar, Kharadi Bypass, Patil Vasti, Kharadi, World Trade Center, Mio Palazzo Chowk, Gera Society, Marvel Zephyr Society	Pune Station	
164	Manapa Bhavan	Nhavare	Gadital Juna Bazar, Pune Station, Bund Garden, Yerwada, Shastri Nagar, Ramwadi, Viman Nagar, Chandan Nagar, Kharadi Bypass, Aaple Ghar, Khandve Nagar, Kesnand Phata, Wagholi, Bakuri Phata, Vitthalwadi, Lonikand, Tulapur Phata, Perne Phata, Koregaon Bhima, Sanaswadi, Shikrapur, Chakan Chowk, Talegaon Dhamdhere, Todkarwadi, Guravmala, Gholapwadi, Parodi Phata, Dhamdhere Vasti, Uralgaon	Na.Ta.Wadi	
165	Manapa Bhavan	Vadgaon Sheri	Gadital Juna Bazar, Pune Station, Bund Garden, Yerwada, Shastri Nagar, Ramwadi, Bramha Suncity Society	Na.Ta.Wadi	
166	Pune Station	Pune International Airport (Lohegaon)	Bund Garden, Yerwada, Shastri Nagar, Ramwadi, Viman Nagar, Phoenix Marketcity, Clover Park, MHADA Colony, Symbiosis School	Pune Station	
166A	Manapa Bhavan	SRA Colony (Viman Nagar)	Bund Garden, Yerwada, Shastri Nagar, Ramwadi, Viman Nagar, Phoenix Marketcity	Pune Station	
167	Bhekrainagar	Wagholi	Hadapsar, Magarpatta, Mundhwa, Yashwant Nagar, Kharadi Bypass, Aaple Ghar, Khandve Nagar, Kesnand Phata	Bhekrainagar	
168	Shaniwar Wada	Keshav Nagar Mundhwa	Gadital Juna Bazar, Pune Station, Westend, Camp, Pulgate, Fatima Nagar, Sopanbaug, Ghorpadi, Ghorpadi Post, Pingale Vasti, Lonkar Colony, Mundhwa	Na.Ta.Wadi	
168A	Shaniwar Wada	Ghorpadi Post	Gadital Juna Bazar, Pune Station, Westend, Camp, Pulgate, Fatima Nagar, Sopanbaug, Ghorpadi	Na.Ta.Wadi	
169	Shaniwar Wada	Keshav Nagar Mundhwa	Gadital Juna Bazar, Pune Station, Bund Garden, Mira Nagar, Koregaon Park, Kavadewadi, Tadigutta, Lonkar Colony, Mundhwa	Na.Ta.Wadi	
170	Pune Station	Yewalewadi	Westend, Pulgate, Military Hospital Wanwadi, Netaji Nagar, Lulla Nagar, Kamela, Kondhwa Khurd, Kausarbaug, Somji Chowk, Khadi Machine Chowk	Pune Station	
171	Hadapsar	Nhavare	Manjari Phata, Shewalewadi, Loni Kalbhor, Theur Phata, Kunjirwadi, Sortapwadi, Uruli Kanchan, Mhetre Vasti, Sahajpur Phata, Kasurdi Phata, Yavat, Bhandgaon, Wakhari, Chouphula, Kedgaon, Kedgaon Station, Khopodi, Pargaon Salumalu, Nagargaon Phata, Andhalgaon	Hadapsar	
172	Pune Station	Yewalewadi	Rasta Peth, Nana Peth, Ramoshi Gate, Apsara Talkies, Gultekdi, Marketyard, Gangadham Chowk, Kakade Vasti, VIIT College, Shatrunjay Mandir, Khadi Machine Chowk, Tilekar Nagar, Kamthe Nagar	Upper	
174	Pune Station	NDA Gate	Westend, Sharbatwala Chowk, Quarter Gate, Nana Peth, Ganesh Peth, City Post, Laxmi Road, Alka Talkies, Deccan Corner, Garware College, Nalstop, Karve Road, Kothrud Stand, Karve Nagar, Galinde Path, Warje Malwadi, Shivane, Uttam Nagar, Kondhwa Gate	Na.Ta.Wadi	
175	Shaniwar Wada	Hadapsar	Gadital Juna Bazar, Pune Station, Westend, Pune Cantonment, Southern Command Memorial, Ghorpadi Post, Ghorpadi, Jehangir Nagar, Bhim Nagar, Shinde Vasti, Hadapsar MIDC, Vaiduwadi	Hadapsar	
176	Pune Station	Undri Wadachiwadi	Westend, Camp, Pulgate, Fatima Nagar, AFMC, Jagtap Chowk, Kedari Nagar, Wanwadi, NIBM Corner, Kamela, Kondhwa Khurd, Kausarbaug, Somji Chowk, Khadi Machine Chowk, Pisoli	Hadapsar	
177	Pune Station	Bhangire Nagar (Mohammadwadi)	Westend, Camp, Pulgate, Fatima Nagar, Jagtap Chowk, Kedari Nagar, Wanwadi, NIBM, Lodha Towers	Pune Station	
179	Hadapsar	Lohegaon	Magarpatta, Mundhwa, Kharadi Bypass, Chandan Nagar, Viman Nagar, Phoenix Marketcity, Sakore Nagar, MHADA Colony, Pune International Airport, Lohegaon Air Force Station	Hadapsar	
180	Na.Ta.Wadi	Bhekrainagar	Shivaji Nagar, Manapa Bhavan, Vasant Talkies, Phadke Haud, Rasta Peth, Nana Peth, Ramoshi Gate, Golibar Maidan, Pulgate, Fatima Nagar, Ramtekdi, Hadapsar	Bhekrainagar	
183	Hadapsar	Wagholi	Manjari Phata, Shewalewadi, Loni Kalbhor, Theur Phata, Theur Gaon, Kolwadi, Kesnand Gaon	Hadapsar	
184	Hadapsar	Ramdara Mandir	Manjari Phata, Shewalewadi, Loni Kalbhor, Loni Gaon, Sitaram Mala, Ramdara Railway Crossing	Hadapsar	
185	Hadapsar	Wagholi	Manjari Phata, Mahadev Nagar, Serum Institute, Dhere Bungalow, Gopalpatti, Manjari Railway Station, Belhekar Vasti, Manjari Budruk, Manjari Khurd, Awhalwadi, Kalubai Nagar, Wagholi Bazar, Kesnand Phata	Hadapsar	
186	Hadapsar	JSPM College (Satav Nagar)	Hadapsar Gaon, Sasane Nagar, Railway Crossing, Sayyed Nagar, Satav Nagar	Hadapsar	
188	Hadapsar	Katraj	Bhekrainagar, Saswad Road, Mantarwadi, Handewadi, Undri, Pisoli, Khadi Machine Chowk, Gokul Nagar	Hadapsar	
189	Hadapsar	Devachi Uruli	Bhekrainagar, Saswad Road, Mantarwadi, Raut Vasti, Dhangar Vasti	Hadapsar	
190	Hadapsar	Wadki Gaon	Bhekrainagar, Saswad Road, Power House, Phursungi, Harpale Vasti, Gaikwad Vasti	Hadapsar	
192	Hadapsar	Undri Wadachiwadi	Hadapsar Gaon, Sasane Nagar, Railway Crossing, Sayyed Nagar, Satav Nagar, Mohammadwadi, Undri, Pisoli Chowk	Hadapsar	
193	Hadapsar	Khutbav Gaon	Manjari Phata, Shewalewadi, Loni Kalbhor, Theur Phata, Kunjirwadi, Sortapwadi, Uruli Kanchan, Mhetre Vasti, Sahajpur Phata, Kasurdi Phata, Kamatwadi, Khamgaon, Tambewadi, Ladkatwadi, Nathachiwadi	Hadapsar	
195	Hadapsar	Holkarwadi	Hadapsar Gaon, Sasane Nagar, Railway Crossing, Sayyed Nagar, Satav Nagar, JSPM College, Bhairat Vasti, Handewadi Chowk, Holkar Vasti	Hadapsar	
196	Hadapsar	Adarsh Nagar	Bhekrainagar, Saswad Road, Kachara Depot, Lucky Wajan Kata, Devachi Uruli	Hadapsar	
198	Hadapsar	Manjari Budruk	Magarpatta, Amanora Mall, Mundhwa, Keshav Nagar, Lonkar Nagar, Ghule Vasti	Hadapsar	
199	Kothrud Depot	Shewalewadi	Vanaz, Anand Nagar, Paud Road, Nalstop, Garware College, Deccan Corner, Alka Talkies, Tilak Road, Swargate, Golibar Maidan, Pulgate, Fatima Nagar, Ramtekdi, Hadapsar, Manjari Phata	Shewalewadi	
200	Shewalewadi	Alandi	Manjari Phata, Hadapsar, Magarpatta, Mundhwa, Kharadi Bypass, Chandan Nagar, Viman Nagar, Ramwadi, Don Bosco School, Yerwada, Nagpur Chawl, 509 Chowk, Tingre Nagar, Vishrantwadi, Kalas, Dighi, Magazine Chowk, Sai Mandir, Charholi Phata, Dehu Phata	Shewalewadi	
201	Bhekrainagar	Alandi	Hadapsar, Ramtekdi, Fatima Nagar, Pulgate, Westend, Pune Station, Bund Garden, Yerwada, Deccan College, Phule Nagar, Vishrantwadi, Kalas, Dighi, Magazine Chowk, Sai Mandir, Charholi Phata, Dehu Phata	Charholi	
202	Shewalewadi	Warje Malwadi	Manjari Phata, Hadapsar, Ramtekdi, Fatima Nagar, Pulgate, Juna Pulgate, Kashewadi, Ramoshi Gate, Nana Peth, Ganesh Peth, City Post, Laxmi Road, Alka Talkies, Deccan Corner, Garware College, Nalstop, Karve Road, Kothrud Stand, Karve Nagar, Galinde Path	Shewalewadi	
203	Pune Station	Shewalewadi	Westend, Camp, Pulgate, Fatima Nagar, Ramtekdi, Hadapsar, Manjari Phata	Shewalewadi	
204	Bhekrainagar	Chinchwad Gaon	Hadapsar, Ramtekdi, Fatima Nagar, Pulgate, Westend, Pune Station, Gadital Juna Bazar, Manapa Bhavan, Shivaji Nagar, Mhasoba Gate, University Gate, Bremen Chowk, Aundh, Sangvi Phata, Rakshak Chowk, Jagtap Dairy, Kalewadi Phata, Dange Chowk, Chaphekar Chowk	Bhekrainagar & Hadapsar	
205	Shewalewadi	Sangvi	Manjari Phata, Hadapsar, Ramtekdi, Fatima Nagar, Pulgate, Westend, Pune Station, Gadital Juna Bazar, Manapa Bhavan, Shivaji Nagar, Mhasoba Gate, University Gate, Sakal Nagar, Baner Phata, Sanewadi ITI, Parihar Chowk, Aundh, Sangvi Phata, BG College, Juni Sangvi	Shewalewadi	
207	Swargate	Saswad	Golibar Maidan, Pulgate, Fatima Nagar, Ramtekdi, Hadapsar, Bhekrainagar, Saswad Road, Mantarwadi, Wadki Nala, Dive Ghat, Zendewadi, Dive Gaon	Hadapsar	
207A	Hadapsar	Saswad	Bhekrainagar, Saswad Road, Mantarwadi, Wadki Nala, Dive Ghat, Zendewadi, Dive Gaon	Hadapsar	
207AC	Manapa Bhavan	Saswad	Gadital Juna Bazar, Pune Station, Westend, Camp, Pulgate, Fatima Nagar, Ramtekdi, Hadapsar, Bhekrainagar, Saswad Road, Mantarwadi, Wadki Nala, Dive Ghat, Zendewadi, Dive Gaon	Hadapsar	
207N	Hadapsar	Narayanpur	Bhekrainagar, Saswad Road, Mantarwadi, Wadki Nala, Dive Ghat, Zendewadi, Dive Gaon, Saswad, Bhiwadi Gaon, Purandar Phata	Hadapsar	
208	Bhekrainagar	Hinjewadi Phase 3	Hadapsar, Ramtekdi, Fatima Nagar, Pulgate, Westend, Pune Station, Gadital Juna Bazar, Manapa Bhavan, Shivaji Nagar, Mhasoba Gate, University Gate, Sakal Nagar, Baner Phata, Baner Gaon, Balewadi Phata, Radha Chowk, Balewadi Stadium, Wakad Bridge, Hinjewadi Chowk, Infosys Phase 1, Wipro Circle, Infosys Phase 2, Gangaramwadi Circle	Bhekrainagar	
208B	Hinjewadi Ph.3	Pulgate	Gangaramwadi Circle, Infosys Phase 2, Wipro Circle, Mezza Nine, Hinjewadi Chowk, Wakad Bridge, Balewadi Depot, Radha Chowk Baner, Baner Depot, Balewadi Phata, Baner Gaon, Baner Phata, Sakal Nagar, University Gate, Mhasoba Gate, Shivaji Nagar, Manapa Bhavan, Gadital Juna Bazar, Pune Station, Westend, Camp	Maan-Hinjewadi	
209	Katraj	Saswad	Gokul Nagar, Khadi Machine Chowk, Yewalewadi, Trinity College, Bopdev Ghat, Askarwadi, Bhivri, Bopdev Gaon, Chambli, Hivre Gaon	Katraj	
209A	Swargate	Saswad	Bhapkar Petrol Pump, Gultekdi, Marketyard, Gangadham Chowk, Lulla Nagar, Kamela, Kondhwa Khurd, Kausarbaug, Somji Chowk, Khadi Machine Chowk, Yewalewadi, Trinity College, Bopdev Ghat, Askarwadi, Bhivri, Bopdev Gaon, Chambli, Hivre Gaon	Katraj	
210	Hadapsar	Jejuri MIDC	Bhekrainagar, Saswad Road, Mantarwadi, Wadki Nala, Dive Ghat, Zendewadi, Dive Gaon, Saswad, Khalad Phata, Walunj Phata, Takrarwadi, Sakurde, Belsar Phata, Jejuri	Hadapsar	
211	Saswad	Uruli Kanchan	Ambodi, Vanpuri, Udachiwadi, Singapur, Waghapur, Shindawane Ghat, Shindawane Gaon	Hadapsar	
212	Hadapsar	Morgaon	Bhekrainagar, Saswad Road, Mantarwadi, Wadki Nala, Dive Ghat, Zendewadi, Dive Gaon, Saswad, Khalad Phata, Walunj Phata, Takrarwadi, Sakurde, Belsar Phata, Jejuri, Jejuri Railway Station, Khomane Mala, Kadepathar, Chorachi Wadi	Hadapsar	
213	Hadapsar	Nira	Bhekrainagar, Saswad Road, Mantarwadi, Wadki Nala, Dive Ghat, Zendewadi, Dive Gaon, Saswad, Khalad Phata, Walunj Phata, Takrarwadi, Sakurde, Belsar Phata, Jejuri, Jejuri MIDC, Jagtap Mala, Daundaj, Walhe, Thopatewadi, Pimpre Khurd, Nira Railway Station	Hadapsar	
214	Katraj	Sinhagad College	D-Mart, Ambegaon, Indu Lawns	Katraj	
215	Swargate	Chintamani Dnyanpeeth (Ambegaon)	Panchmi Hotel, Sarang Society, Date Stop, Padmavati, Balaji Nagar, Mohan Nagar, Ambegaon	Katraj	
216	Shivaji Nagar	Bharti Vidyapeeth	Manapa Bhavan, Vasant Talkies, Mandai, Swargate, Bhapkar Petrol Pump, Natubaug, Padmavati, Balaji Nagar	Katraj	
216A	Bharti Vidyapeeth	Khadki Railway Station	Balaji Nagar, Padmavati, Date Stop, Sarang Society, Laxmi Narayan Chowk, Dandekar Pul, Dattawadi, Navi Peth, Mhatre Pul, Erandwane, Nalstop, Symbiosis College, Senapati Bapat Road, Chatushrungi, University Gate, Pune University, Joshi Gate, Ayyappa Mandir	Katraj	
219	Kothrud Depot	Alandi	Vanaz, Anand Nagar, Paud Road, Nalstop, Garware College, Deccan, FC Road, Modern College, Manapa Bhavan, Shivaji Nagar, Patil Estate, Wakdewadi, Mula Road, Deccan College, Phule Nagar, Vishrantwadi, Kalas, Dighi, Magazine Chowk, Sai Mandir, Charholi Phata, Dehu Phata	Kothrud	
220	Hadapsar	Kesnand Gaon	Magarpatta City, Seasons Mall, Mundhwa, Kharadi Bypass, Aaple Ghar, Khandve Nagar, Kesnand Phata, Wagholi	Hadapsar	
221	Wagholi	Ivy Estate	Kesnand Phata	Hadapsar	
225	Hinjewadi Ph.3	Kharadi	Gangaramwadi Circle, Infosys Phase 2, Wipro Circle, Mezza Nine, Hinjewadi Phase 1, Wakad Bridge, Wakad, Mankar Chowk, Vishal Nagar, Wakad Phata, Rakshak Chowk, Sangvi Phata, Aundh, Bremen Chowk, University Gate, Mhasoba Gate, Shivaji Nagar, Manapa Bhavan, Gadital Juna Bazar, Pune Station, Bund Garden, Yerwada, Shastri Nagar, Ramwadi, Viman Nagar, Chnadan Nagar, Kharadi Bypass, Patil Vasti	Pune Station	
227	Marketyard	Marnewadi	Gultekdi, Swargate, Dandekar Pul, Nilayam Talkies, Lokmanya Nagar, Ganjavewadi, Alka Talkies, Deccan Corner, Garware College, Nalstop, Paud Road, Anand Nagar, Vanaz, Kothrud Depot, Chandni Chowk, Bhagvat Vasti, Bhugaon, Bhukum, Pirangut, Ghotawade Phata, Minilec Company, Urawade Gaon, Marnewadi Phata, Ambegaon	Upper	
227A	Marketyard	Kharawade Mhasoba Devasthan	Gultekdi, Swargate, Dandekar Pul, Nilayam Talkies, Lokmanya Nagar, Ganjavewadi, Alka Talkies, Deccan Corner, Garware College, Nalstop, Paud Road, Anand Nagar, Vanaz, Kothrud Depot, Chandni Chowk, Bhagvat Vasti, Bhugaon, Bhukum, Pirangut, Ghotawade Phata, Minilec Company, Urawade Gaon, Marnewadi Phata, Mutha Ghat, Mutha Gaon, Andgaon	Upper	
227AB	Marketyard	Lavarde Gaon (Temghar Dam)	Gultekdi, Swargate, Dandekar Pul, Nilayam Talkies, Lokmanya Nagar, Ganjavewadi, Alka Talkies, Deccan Corner, Garware College, Nalstop, Paud Road, Anand Nagar, Vanaz, Kothrud Depot, Chandni Chowk, Bhagvat Vasti, Bhugaon, Bhukum, Pirangut, Ghotawade Phata, Minilec Company, Urawade Gaon, Marnewadi Phata, Mutha Ghat, Mutha Gaon, Andgaon, Kharawade, Kolawade	Upper	
228	Katraj	Vadgaon Maval	Ambegaon, Navale Bridge, Vadgaon Bridge, Warje, Chandni Chowk, Bavdhan, Sutarwadi, Girme Park, Radha Chowk Baner, Balewadi Stadium, Wakad Bridge, Bhumkar Chowk, Indira College, Tathawade, JSPM College, Punawale, Ravet Corner, Mukai Chowk Kiwale, Mamurdi, Dehu Road, Begdewadi, Somatane Phata, Tukaram Nagar, Ghorawadi, Talegaon Dabhade, Talegaon Railway Station, Paisa Fund, Urse Phata	Balewadi & Katraj	
231	Marketyard	Shilimb Gaon (Maval)	Gultekdi, Swargate, Dandekar Pul, Nilayam Talkies, Lokmanya Nagar, Ganjavewadi, Alka Talkies, Deccan Corner, Garware College, Nalstop, Paud Road, Anand Nagar, Vanaz, Kothrud Depot, Chandni Chowk, Bhagvat Vasti, Bhugaon, Bhukum, Pirangut, Ghotawade Phata, Sutarwadi, Kasar Amboli, Darawali, Paud Gaon, Karmoli, Savargaon, Chale Gaon, Dakhane, Satesai, Kolvan Gaon, Hadashi, Kashig Gaon, Javan, Wagheshwar, Pawana Lake, Ajivali	Upper	
232	Marketyard	Belawade	Gultekdi, Swargate, Dandekar Pul, Nilayam Talkies, Lokmanya Nagar, Ganjavewadi, Alka Talkies, Deccan Corner, Garware College, Nalstop, Paud Road, Anand Nagar, Vanaz, Kothrud Depot, Chandni Chowk, Bhagvat Vasti, Bhugaon, Bhukum, Pirangut, Ghotawade Phata, Sutarwadi, Kasar Amboli, Darawali, Paud Gaon, Kondhawale, Khechare Phata	Upper	
233	Marketyard	Paud Gaon	Gultekdi, Swargate, Dandekar Pul, Nilayam Talkies, Lokmanya Nagar, Ganjavewadi, Alka Talkies, Deccan Corner, Garware College, Nalstop, Paud Road, Anand Nagar, Vanaz, Kothrud Depot, Chandni Chowk, Bhagvat Vasti, Bhugaon, Bhukum, Pirangut, Ghotawade Phata, Sutarwadi, Kasar Amboli, Darawali	Upper	
233A	Marketyard	Kolvan Gaon	Gultekdi, Swargate, Dandekar Pul, Nilayam Talkies, Lokmanya Nagar, Ganjavewadi, Alka Talkies, Deccan Corner, Garware College, Nalstop, Paud Road, Anand Nagar, Vanaz, Kothrud Depot, Chandni Chowk, Bhagvat Vasti, Bhugaon, Bhukum, Pirangut, Ghotawade Phata, Sutarwadi, Kasar Amboli, Darawali, Paud Gaon, Karmoli, Savargaon, Chale Gaon, Dakhane, Satesai	Upper	
233B	Marketyard	Bhadas Gaon	Gultekdi, Swargate, Dandekar Pul, Nilayam Talkies, Lokmanya Nagar, Ganjavewadi, Alka Talkies, Deccan Corner, Garware College, Nalstop, Paud Road, Anand Nagar, Vanaz, Kothrud Depot, Chandni Chowk, Bhagvat Vasti, Bhugaon, Bhukum, Pirangut, Ghotawade Phata, Sutarwadi, Kasar Amboli, Darawali, Paud Gaon, Karmoli, Hulawalewadi, Khubawali, Asade, Gavadewadi	Upper	
234	Manapa Bhavan	Dhole Patil College (Kharadi)	Gadital Juna Bazar, Pune Station, Bund Garden, Yerwada, Shastri Nagar, Ramwadi, Viman Nagar, Chandan Nagar, Kharadi Bypass, Patil Vasti, Kharadi Gaon, World Trade Center, Mio Palazzo Chowk, Gera Society, Marvel Zephyr Society	Na.Ta.Wadi	
235	Katraj	Kharadi	Balaji Nagar, Padmavati, Natubaug, Bhapkar Petrol Pump, Swargate, Ramoshi Gate, Nana Peth, Rasta Peth, Pune Station, Bund Garden, Yerwada, Shastri Nagar, Ramwadi, Viman Nagar, Chandan Nagar, Sunita Nagar, Sainath Nagar, Bidi Kamgar Colony, Patil Vasti	Katraj	
236	Katraj	Wagholi	Balaji Nagar, Padmavati, Natubaug, Bhapkar Petrol Pump, Swargate, Ramoshi Gate, Nana Peth, Rasta Peth, Pune Station, Bund Garden, Yerwada, Shastri Nagar, Ramwadi, Viman Nagar, Chandan Nagar, Kharadi Bypass, Aaple Ghar, Khandve Nagar, Kesnand Phata	Wagholi	
256	Pune Station	Balewadi Depot	Gadital Juna Bazar, Manapa Bhavan, Shivaji Nagar, Mhasoba Gate, University Gate, Sakal Nagar, Baner Phata, Baner Gaon, Balewadi Phata, Chakankar Mala, Balewadi Gaon, Moze Vidyalaya	Baner	
257	Alandi	Markal	Dhanore, Solu Gaon, Vadgaon Shinde Phata	Bhosari	
257A	Wagholi	Tulapur	Kesnand Phata, Bakuri Phata, Vitthalwadi, Lonikand, Tulapur Phata, Phulgaon	Wagholi	
258	Manapa Bhavan	Pinnacle Neelanchal Society (Sus Gaon)	Shivaji Nagar, Mhasoba Gate, University Gate, Sakal Nagar, Baner Phata, Baner Gaon, Kalamkar Chowk, Pan Card Club Corner, Nanavare Chowk, Bitwise Tower, Mohan Nagar, VIBGYOR School	Baner	
262	Pune Station	Dehu Gaon	Gadital Juna Bazar, Manapa Bhavan, Shivaji Nagar, Patil Estate, Wakdewadi, Khadki, Bopodi, Dapodi, Phugewadi, Kasarwadi, Nashik Phata, Vallabh Nagar, Kharalwadi Corner, Pimpri Road, PCMC, Chinchwad Station, Kalbhor Nagar, Akurdi Chowk, Nigdi, Bhakti Shakti, Durga Tekdi, Garden City, Dehu Road, Chincholi, Malinagar	Pune Station	
264	Bhosari	Pabal Gaon	Shastri Chowk, Magazine Chowk, Sai Mandir, Charholi Phata, Dehu Phata, Alandi, Thakar Vasti, Vadgaon Ghenand, Shel Pimpalgaon, Mohitewadi, Bahul Gaon, Sabalewadi, Chouphula, Karandi, Parhadmala, Kendur Gaon, Thitewadi, Choudhar Bend	Bhosari	
276	Warje Malwadi	Chinchwad Gaon	Galinde Path, Karve Nagar, Kothrud Stand, Karve Road, Nalstop, Symbiosis College, Senapati Bapat Road, Chatushrungi, University Gate, Bremen Chowk, Aundh, Sangvi Phata, Rakshak Chowk, Jagtap Dairy, Kalewadi Phata, Dange Chowk, Chaphekar Chowk	Kothrud & Balewadi	
276A	NDA Gate	Chinchwad Gaon	Kondhwa Gate, Uttam Nagar, Shivane, Warje Malwadi, Galinde Path, Karve Nagar, Kothrud Stand, Karve Road, Nalstop, Symbiosis College, Senapati Bapat Road, Chatushrungi, University Gate, Bremen Chowk, Aundh, Sangvi Phata, Rakshak Chowk, Jagtap Dairy, Kalewadi Phata, Dange Chowk, Chaphekar Chowk	Kothrud	
277	Kothrud Depot	Bhosari	Vanaz, Anand Nagar, Paud Road, Nalstop, Symbiosis College, Senapati Bapat Road, Chatushrungi, University Gate, Bremen Chowk, Aundh, Sangvi Phata, BG College, Navi Sangvi, Katepuram, Pimple Gurav, Kalpataru Society, Nashik Phata, Bhosari MIDC, Landewadi	Bhosari	
279	Marketyard	Katarkhadak	Gultekdi, Swargate, Dandekar Pul, Nilayam Talkies, Lokmanya Nagar, Ganjavewadi, Alka Talkies, Deccan Corner, Garware College, Nalstop, Paud Road, Anand Nagar, Vanaz, Kothrud Depot, Chandni Chowk, Bhagvat Vasti, Bhugaon, Bhukum, Pirangut, Ghotawade Phata, Bhare Phata, Shelkewadi, Materewadi, Rihe, Kemsewadi, Pimpoli, Khamboli	Upper	
281	Warje Malwadi	Nigdi Bhakti Shakti	Galinde Path, Karve Nagar, Kothrud Stand, Karve Road, Nalstop, Garware College, Deccan, FC Road, Shivaji Nagar, Patil Estate, Wakdewadi, Khadki, Bopodi, Dapodi, Phugewadi, Kasarwadi, Nashik Phata, Vallabh Nagar, Kharalwadi Corner, Pimpri Road, PCMC, Chinchwad Station, Kalbhor Nagar, Akurdi Chowk, Nigdi	Nigdi & Kothrud	
282	Warje Malwadi	Bhosari	Galinde Path, Karve Nagar, Kothrud Stand, Karve Road, Nalstop, Garware College, Deccan, FC Road, Shivaji Nagar, Patil Estate, Wakdewadi, Khadki, Bopodi, Dapodi, Phugewadi, Kasarwadi, Nashik Phata, Bhosari MIDC, Landewadi	Kothrud	
283	Pune Station	Kumbare Park	Somwar Peth, Apollo Talkies, Phadke Haud, Budhwar Peth, City Post, Laxmi Road, Alka Talkies, Deccan Corner, Garware College, Nalstop, Karve Road, Kothrud Stand, Karve Nagar, Dahanukar Colony, Cummins Company, Mahatma Society, Sahjanand Society	Kothrud	
287	Ajeenkya DY Patil College (Lohegaon)	Bhosari	Pride World City, Pathare Mala, Kaljewadi, Tajne Mala, Charholi, Sai Mandir, Magazine Chowk, Shastri Chowk	Charholi	
289	Shewalewadi	Upper Depot	Manjari Phata, Hadapsar, Ramtekdi, Fatima Nagar, Jagtap Chowk, Wanwadi, Kedari Nagar, NIBM Corner, Kamela, Kondhwa Khurd, Kausarbaug, Somji Chowk, Khadi Machine Chowk, Shatrunjay Mandir, Salve Garden	Shewalewadi	
290	Swargate	Jambhulwadi	Bhapkar Petrol Pump, Natubaug, Padmavati, Balaji Nagar, Katraj, Santosh Nagar, Datta Nagar, Shani Nagar, Jambhulwadi Lake	Katraj	
291	Hadapsar	Katraj	Ramtekdi, Fatima Nagar, Jagtap Chowk, Kedari Nagar, Wanwadi, NIBM Corner, Kamela, Kondhwa Khurd, Kausarbaug, Somji Chowk, Khadi Machine Chowk, Gokul Nagar	Hadapsar	
292	Katraj	Kondhanpur	Gujarwadi PMT Stand, Mangdewadi, Bhilarewadi, Katraj Ghat, Khed Shivapur, Shivapur Dargah, Khed Shivapur Gaon, Ranje Gaon, Arvi Phata	Katraj	
292A	Katraj	Kalyan	Gujarwadi PMT Stand, Mangdewadi, Bhilarewadi, Katraj Ghat, Khed Shivapur, Shivapur Dargah, Khed Shivapur Gaon, Ranje Gaon, Arvi Phata, Kondhanpur, Shivtarewadi	Katraj	
292B	Katraj	Avsarwadi	Gujarwadi PMT Stand, Mangdewadi, Bhilarewadi, Katraj Ghat, Khed Shivapur, Shivapur Dargah, Khed Shivapur Gaon, Ranje Gaon, Arvi Phata, Kondhanpur	Katraj	
292D	Katraj	Kusgaon	Gujarwadi PMT Stand, Mangdewadi, Bhilarewadi, Katraj Ghat, Khed Shivapur, Shivapur Dargah, Khed Shivapur Gaon	Katraj	
293	Katraj	Saswad	Gujarwadi PMT Stand, Mangdewadi, Bhilarewadi, Katraj Ghat, Khed Shivapur, Shivapur Dargah, Varve, Kelawade, Nasrapur Phata, Kapurhol, Diwale, Balaji Mandir, Ketkawale, Purandar Fort, Narayanpur, Bhivadi	Katraj	
296	Katraj	Velhe	Gujarwadi PMT Stand, Mangdewadi, Bhilarewadi, Katraj Ghat, Khed Shivapur, Shivapur Dargah, Varve, Kelawade, Nasrapur Phata, Nasrapur, Didghar, Jambhali, Kolawadi, Sangvi Budruk, Ambavane, Karanjawane, Adawali, Askawadi, Margasani, Vinzar, Lashirgaon, Dapode, Pabe Phata, Hirpodi, Kondhawale Phata	Katraj	
296A	Katraj	Vanganiwadi	Gujarwadi PMT Stand, Mangdewadi, Bhilarewadi, Katraj Ghat, Khed Shivapur, Shivapur Dargah, Varve, Kelawade, Nasrapur Phata, Nasrapur, Didghar, Jambhali, Kolawadi, Sangvi Budruk, Ambavane, Karanjawane, Ketkavane, Mangdari, Katawadi, Nigade	Katraj	
297	Shivaji Nagar	Rajas Society	Manapa Bhavan, Vasant Talkies, Mandai, Swargate, Bhapkar Petrol Pump, Natubaug, Padmavati, Balaji Nagar, Katraj	Na.Ta.Wadi	
298	Katraj	Chinchwad Gaon	Balaji Nagar, Padmavati, Date Stop, Sarang Society, Laxmi Narayan Chowk, Swargate, Shanipar, ABC, Manapa Bhavan, Shivaji Nagar, Mhasoba Gate, University Gate, Bremen Chowk, Aundh, Sangvi Phata, Rakshak Chowk, Jagtap Dairy, Kalewadi Phata, Dange Chowk, Chaphekar Chowk	Katraj & Pimpri	
299	Katraj	Bhosari	Balaji Nagar, Padmavati, Natubaug, Bhapkar Petrol Pump, Swargate, Dandekar Pul, Lokmanya Nagar, Ganjavewadi, Alka Talkies, Deccan, FC Road, Shivaji Nagar, Patil Estate, Wakdewadi, Khadki, Bopodi, Dapodi, Phugewadi, Kasarwadi, Nashik Phata, Bhosari MIDC, Landewadi	Katraj & Bhosari	
301	Katraj	Shewalewadi	Balaji Nagar, Padmavati, Natubaug, Bhapkar Petrol Pump, Swargate, Golibar Maidan, Pulgate, Fatima Nagar, Ramtekdi, Hadapsar, Manjari Phata	Shewalewadi	
301A	Katraj	Bhekrainagar	Balaji Nagar, Padmavati, Natubaug, Bhapkar Petrol Pump, Swargate, Golibar Maidan, Pulgate, Fatima Nagar, Ramtekdi, Hadapsar	Bhekrainagar	
301C	Hadapsar	Swargate	Ramtekdi, Fatima Nagar, Pulgate, Golibar Maidan	Hadapsar	
302	Pimpri Gaon	Bhosari (Gavhane Vasti)	Shagun Chowk, PCMC, Pimpri Road, H.A Grounds, Nehru Nagar, Pimpri Depot, Indrayani Nagar, Landewadi	Pimpri	
302A	Pimpri Gaon	Alandi	Shagun Chowk, PCMC, Pimpri Road, H.A Grounds, Nehru Nagar, Pimpri Depot, Indrayani Nagar, Landewadi, Bhosari, Shastri Chowk, Magazine Chowk, Sai Mandir, Charholi Phata, Dehu Phata	Pimpri	
303	Nigdi	Akurdi Railway Station	Bhakti Shakti, Transport Nagar, Appu Ghar, Big India, Ganga Nagar, Sambhaji Chowk, Pradhikaran	Nigdi	
303A	Nigdi	Gahunje Gaon	Bhakti Shakti, Transport Nagar, Appu Ghar, PCP College, Akurdi Railway Station, DY Patil College, Bhondve Corner, Ravet, Mukai Chowk Kiwale, Kiwale Gaon, Symbiosis University, Lodha Belmondo	Nigdi	
304	Chinchwad Gaon	Bhosari (Gavhane Vasti)	Chinchwad Station, Mohan Nagar, KSB Chowk, Telco Road, Gavli Matha, Indrayani Nagar, Landewadi	Pimpri	
305	Nigdi	Vadgaon Maval	Bhakti Shakti, Garden City, Dehu Road, Begdewadi, Shelarwadi, Somatane Phata, Tukaram Nagar, Ghorawadi, Talegaon Dabhade, Talegaon Railway Station, Paisa Fund, Urse Phata	Nigdi	
305A	Nigdi	Navlakh Umbare	Bhakti Shakti, Garden City, Dehu Road, Begdewadi, Shelarwadi, Somatane Phata, Tukaram Nagar, Ghorawadi, Talegaon Dabhade, Talegaon Railway Station, Paisa Fund, Urse Phata, Katvi, Ambi, DY Patil College, Talegaon MIDC	Nigdi	
305B	Nigdi	Mindewadi	Bhakti Shakti, Garden City, Dehu Road, Begdewadi, Shelarwadi, Somatane Phata, Tukaram Nagar, Ghorawadi, Talegaon Dabhade, Talegaon Railway Station, Paisa Fund, Urse Phata, Katvi, Ambi, DY Patil College, Talegaon MIDC, Navlakh Umbare, Badhale Vasti	Nigdi	
306	Hinjewadi Ph.3	Dange Chowk	Gangaramwadi Circle, Infosys Phase 2, Wipro Circle, Mezza Nine, Hinjewadi Chowk, Bhumkar Chowk	Balewadi & Baner	
306A	Dange Chowk	Hinjewadi Hills Nere	Bhumkar Chowk, Hinjewadi Chowk, Infosys Phase 1, Mezza Nine, Laxmi Chowk, Marunji, Nere	Baner	
307	Chinchwad Gaon	Ravet ISKCON Mandir	Chaphekar Chowk, Walhekarwadi, Munjaba Vasahat, Chinchwade Farm, Bhondve Vasti, Shinde Vasti	Pimpri	
308	Nigdi	Gharkul Vasahat	Yamuna Nagar, Krushna Nagar, Ajantha Nagar, Thermax Chowk, Spine Road	Nigdi	
309	Alandi	Dehu Gaon	Dudulgaon, Moshi, Moi Phata, Chikhali, Patil Nagar, Talawade, Tukaram Nagar, Vitthalwadi	Bhosari	
310	Pune Station	Chikhali	Gadital, RTO Office, Patil Estate, Wakdewadi, Khadki, Bopodi, Dapodi, Phugewadi, Kasarwadi, Nashik Phata, Vallabh Nagar, Sant Tukaram Nagar, YCM Hospital, Nehru Nagar, Yashwant Nagar, Telco Company, Jadhavwadi, Patil Nagar	Pimpri	
311	Pune Station	Pimpri Gaon	Bund Garden, Yerwada, Deccan College, Khadki Cantonment, Khadki Bazar, Bopodi, Dapodi, Phugewadi, Kasarwadi, Nashik Phata, Vallabh Nagar, Sant Tukaram Nagar, YCM Hospital, Nehru Nagar, H.A Grounds, Pimpri Road, Shagun Chowk	Pune Station	
312	Pune Station	Chinchwad Gaon	Bund Garden, Yerwada, Deccan College, Khadki Cantonment, Khadki Bazar, Bopodi, Dapodi, Phugewadi, Kasarwadi, Nashik Phata, Vallabh Nagar, Sant Tukaram Nagar, YCM Hospital, Nehru Nagar, H.A Grounds, Pimpri Road, Bhat Nagar, Link Road	Pune Station	
313	Chinchwad Gaon	Chandkhed	Chaphekar Chowk, Dange Chowk, Bhumkar Chowk, Hinjewadi Chowk, Infosys Phase 1, Mezza Nine, Laxmi Chowk, Marunji, Nere, Kasarsai, Pachane Phata	Pimpri	
313B	Chinchwad Gaon	Kasarsai Karkhana	Chaphekar Chowk, Dange Chowk, Bhumkar Chowk, Hinjewadi Chowk, Infosys Phase 1, Mezza Nine, Laxmi Chowk, Marunji, Nere	Pimpri	
314	Nigdi	Chakan Ambethan Chowk	Yamuna Nagar, Triveni Nagar, Talawade, Fujitsu Company, Indrayani Pul, Mahindra Company, Sigma Chowk, Endurance Company, Mahalunge MIDC, Dwarka Township, Ambethan Gaon, Biradwadi, Chakan	Nigdi	
315	Pune Station	Bhosari	Bund Garden, Yerwada, Netaji High School, Nagpur Chawl, 509 Chowk, Tingre Nagar, Vishrantwadi, Kalas, Dighi, Magazine Chowk, Shastri Chowk	Pune Station	
316	Chinchwad Gaon	Katarkhadak	Chaphekar Chowk, Dange Chowk, Bhumkar Chowk, Hinjewadi Chowk, Infosys Phase 1, Wipro Circle, Infosys Phase 2, Gangaramwadi Circle, Hinjewadi Phase 3, Godambewadi, Shelkewadi, Materewadi, Rihe, Kemsewadi, Pimpoli, Khamboli	Pimpri	
317	Pune Station	Sambhaji Nagar	Tadiwala Road, Mangalwar Peth, RTO Office, Patil Estate, Wakdewadi, Khadki, Bopodi, Dapodi, Phugewadi, Kasarwadi, Nashik Phata, Vallabh Nagar, Kharalwadi Corner, Pimpri Road, PCMC, Chinchwad Station, Kalbhor Nagar, Akurdi Chowk, Nigdi, Yamuna Nagar, Ajantha Nagar, Thermax Chowk	Pune Station & Pimpri	
318	Pune Station	Krushna Nagar	RTO Office, Shivaji Nagar, Mhasoba Gate, University Gate, Bremen Chowk, Aundh, Sangvi Phata, Rakshak Chowk, Jagtap Dairy, Kalewadi Phata, Dange Chowk, Chaphekar Chowk, SKF Company, Bhoir Nagar, Akurdi Chowk, Nigdi, Yamuna Nagar, Ajantha Nagar, Thermax Chowk, Sane Chowk	Pune Station	
319	Mukai Chowk Kiwale	Pimple Gurav	Adarsh Nagar, Ravet, Bhondve Patil Estate, Appu Ghar, Transport Nagar, Nigdi, Akurdi Chowk, Kalbhor Nagar, Chinchwad Station, PCMC, Pimpri Road, Shagun Chowk, Pimpri Gaon, Pimple Saudagar, Sudarshan Nagar	Nigdi	
320	Hinjewadi Ph.3	Chinchwad Gaon	Maan Metro Depot, Maan Gaon, Thakar Nagar, Pandav Nagar, Infosys Phase 1, Mezza Nine, Hinjewadi Chowk, Bhumkar Chowk, Dange Chowk, Chaphekar Chowk	Balewadi	
321	Hinjewadi Ph.3	Neilsoft Company (Hinjewadi)	Gangaramwadi Circle	Maan-Hinjewadi	
322	Manapa Bhavan	Akurdi Railway Station	Shivaji Nagar, Mhasoba Gate, University Gate, Bremen Chowk, Aundh, Sangvi Phata, BG College, Navi Sangvi, Katepuram, Pimple Gurav, Sudarshan Nagar, Pimple Saudagar, Nakhate Vasti, Rahatani, Tapkir Chowk, Kalewadi, Morya Gosavi Park, Chinchwad Gaon, Chaphekar Chowk, Walhekarwadi, Bijli Nagar, Pradhikaran	Nigdi	
322A	Warje Malwadi	Akurdi Railway Station	Galinde Path, Karve Nagar, Kothrud Stand, Karve Road, Nalstop, Symbiosis College, Senapati Bapat Road, Chatushrungi, University Gate, Bremen Chowk, Aundh, Sangvi Phata, BG College, Navi Sangvi, Katepuram, Pimple Gurav, Sudarshan Nagar, Pimple Saudagar, Pimpri Gaon, Shagun Chowk, Bhat Nagar, Link Road, Chinchwad Gaon, Chaphekar Chowk, Chinchwade Nagar, Bijli Nagar, Gurudwara Chowk	Nigdi	
323	Manapa Bhavan	Chikhali	Shivaji Nagar, Patil Estate, Wakdewadi, Khadki, Bopodi, Dapodi, Phugewadi, Kasarwadi, Nashik Phata, Vallabh Nagar, Sant Tukaram Nagar, YCM Hospital, Nehru Nagar, Yashwant Nagar, Telco Company, Jadhavwadi, Patil Nagar	Pimpri	
323A	Manapa Bhavan	Gharkul Vasahat	Shivaji Nagar, Patil Estate, Wakdewadi, Khadki, Bopodi, Dapodi, Phugewadi, Kasarwadi, Nashik Phata, Vallabh Nagar, Sant Tukaram Nagar, YCM Hospital, Nehru Nagar, Yashwant Nagar, Telco Company, KSB Chowk, Shahu Nagar, Shivtej Nagar	Pimpri	
324	Hinjewadi Ph.3	Bhosari	Gangaramwadi Circle, Infosys Phase 2, Wipro Circle, Mezza Nine, Hinjewadi Chowk, Wakad Bridge, Wakad, Mankar Chowk, Kaspate Vasti, Kalewadi Phata, Jagtap Dairy, Shivar Chowk, Kokane Chowk, Nashik Phata, Bhosari MIDC, Landewadi	Bhosari	
325	Pune Station	Pimple Saudagar	Gadital Juna Bazar, Manapa Bhavan, Shivaji Nagar, Mhasoba Gate, University Gate, Bremen Chowk, Aundh, Sangvi Phata, Rakshak Chowk, Jagtap Dairy, Shivar Chowk, Kunal Icon Society, Roseland Society	Pune Station	
326	Pimpri Gaon	Chikhali	Shagun Chowk, Finolex Morwadi, Morwadi, Pimpri Court, KSB Chowk, Shahu Nagar, Telco Company, Spine Road, Jadhavwadi, Moi Phata, Patil Nagar	Pimpri	
326A	Pimpri Gaon	Chikhali	Shagun Chowk, Finolex Morwadi, Morwadi, Pimpri Court, KSB Chowk, Shahu Nagar, Telco Company, Kudalwadi, Patil Nagar	Pimpri	
327	Hinjewadi Ph.3	Alandi	Gangaramwadi Circle, Infosys Phase 2, Wipro Circle, Mezza Nine, Hinjewadi Chowk, Wakad Bridge, Wakad, Datta Mandir, Dange Chowk, Chaphekar Chowk, Lokmanya Hospital, Chinchwad Station, Mohan Nagar, KSB Chowk, Telco Road, Yashwant Nagar, Gavli Matha, Indrayani Nagar, Landewadi, PMT Chowk, Bhosari, Shastri Chowk, Magazine Chowk, Sai Mandir, Charholi Phata, Dehu Phata	Pimpri	
328	Hinjewadi Ph.3	Wagholi	Gangaramwadi Circle, Infosys Phase 2, Wipro Circle, Mezza Nine, Hinjewadi Chowk, Wakad Bridge, Wakad, Mankar Chowk, Kaspate Vasti, Kalewadi Phata, Jagtap Dairy, Shivar Chowk, Kokane Chowk, Nashik Phata, Bhosari MIDC, Landewadi, Bhosari, Shastri Chowk, Magazine Chowk, Dighi, Kalas, Vishrantwadi, Bhairav Nagar, Kamal Park, Dhanori, Kalwad, Lohegaon, Dadachi Padal, Diamond Waterpark, Kesnand Phata	Wagholi	
329	Pimpri Road	Siddhant College (Sudumbre)	PCMC, Chinchwad Station, Kalbhor Nagar, Akurdi Chowk, Nigdi, Bhakti Shakti, Garden City, Dehu Road, Dehu Road Station, Chincholi, Malinagar, Dehu Gaon, Yelwadi, Sudumbre	Nigdi	
330	Alandi	Talegaon Dabhade	Dehu Phata, Dudulgaon, Moshi, Moi Phata, Chikhali, Patil Nagar, Talawade, Tukaram Nagar, Vitthalwadi, Dehu Gaon, Yelwadi, Sudhavwadi, Indori, Malwadi, Talegaon Station	Pimpri	
331	Pimple Saudagar	Bhosari (Gavhane Vasti)	Nakhate Vasti, Rahatani, Tapkir Chowk, Kalewadi, Pimpri Gaon, Shagun Chowk, PCMC, Pimpri Road, H.A Grounds, Nehru Nagar, Pimpri Depot, Indrayani Nagar, Landewadi	Pimpri	
331A	Pimple Saudagar	Charholi	Nakhate Vasti, Rahatani, Tapkir Chowk, Kalewadi, Pimpri Gaon, Shagun Chowk, PCMC, Pimpri Road, H.A Grounds, Nehru Nagar, Pimpri Depot, Indrayani Nagar, Landewadi, Gavhane Vasti, Bhosari, Shastri Chowk, Magazine Chowk, Sai Mandir, Wadmukhwadi, Kotwalwadi	Pimpri	
331B	Pimple Saudagar	Charholi	Nakhate Vasti, Rahatani, Tapkir Chowk, Kalewadi, Pimpri Gaon, Shagun Chowk, PCMC, Pimpri Road, H.A Grounds, Nehru Nagar, Pimpri Depot, Indrayani Nagar, Landewadi, Gavhane Vasti, Bhosari, Shastri Chowk, Magazine Chowk, Sai Mandir, Charholi Phata, Dabhade Vasti	Pimpri	
332	Nigdi	Bebadohal Gaon	Bhakti Shakti, Garden City, Dehu Road, Begdewadi, Shelarwadi, Somatane Phata, Somatane, Parandwadi	Nigdi	
333	Pune Station	Hinjewadi Phase 3	Gadital Juna Bazar, Manapa Bhavan, Shivaji Nagar, Mhasoba Gate, University Gate, Bremen Chowk, Aundh, Sangvi Phata, Rakshak Chowk, Pimple Nilakh, Vishal Nagar, Mankar Chowk, Wakad, Wakad Bridge, Hinjewadi Chowk, Infosys Phase 1, Wipro Circle, Infosys Phase 2, Gangaramwadi Circle	Pune Station	
334	Pimpri Gaon	Gharkul Vasahat	Shagun Chowk, Finolex Morwadi, Morwadi, Pimpri Court, KSB Chowk, Shahu Nagar, Shivtej Nagar	Nigdi	
336	Nigdi Bhakti Shakti	Wagholi	Nigdi, Akurdi Chowk, Kalbhor Nagar, Chinchwad Station, PCMC, Pimpri Road, Kharalwadi Corner, Vallabh Nagar, Nashik Phata, Kasarwadi, Phugewadi, Dapodi, Bopodi, Khadki Bazar, Khadki Cantonment, Deccan College, Yerwada, Shastri Nagar, Ramwadi, Viman Nagar, Chandan Nagar, Kharadi Bypass, Aaple Ghar, Khandve Nagar, Kesnand Phata	Nigdi & Wagholi	
337	Nigdi Bhakti Shakti	Dhayari DSK Vishwa	Nigdi, Akurdi Chowk, Kalbhor Nagar, Chinchwad Station, PCMC, Pimpri Road, Kharalwadi Corner, Vallabh Nagar, Nashik Phata, Kasarwadi, Phugewadi, Dapodi, Bopodi, Khadki, Wakdewadi, Patil Estate, Shivaji Nagar, JM Road, Deccan, Alka Talkies, Ganjavewadi, Lokmanya Nagar, Dandekar Pul, Panmala, Sinhgad Road, Vitthalwadi, Anand Nagar, Vadgaon Bridge, Dhayari Phata, Dhayari Gaon	Nigdi	
338	Pimpri Road	Bhandara Dongar (Dehu)	PCMC, Chinchwad Station, Kalbhor Nagar, Akurdi Chowk, Nigdi, Bhakti Shakti, Garden City, Dehu Road, Chincholi, Malinagar, Dehu Gaon, Yelwadi	Pimpri	
339	Katraj	Santnagar RTO Office	Balaji Nagar, Padmavati, Natubaug, Bhapkar Petrol Pump, Swargate, Tilak Road, Alka Talkies, Deccan, FC Road, Shivaji Nagar, Patil Estate, Wakdewadi, Khadki, Bopodi, Dapodi, Phugewadi, Kasarwadi, Nashik Phata, Bhosari MIDC, Landewadi, Bhosari, Sadgurunagar, Bhosari Depot, Indrayani Nagar, Sant Nagar, Spine Mall	Bhosari	
340	Nigdi	Alandi	Yamuna Nagar, Ajantha Nagar, Thermax Chowk, Sambhaji Nagar, Spine Road, Gharkul Vasahat, Telco Company, Jadhavwadi Phata, Spine Mall, Sant Nagar, Santnagar RTO Office, Gandharv Nagari, Alankapuram, Charholi Phata, Dehu Phata	Charholi	
341	Nigdi	Urse Gaon	Bhakti Shakti, Garden City, Dehu Road, Begdewadi, Shelarwadi, Somatane Phata, Tukaram Nagar, Ghorawadi, Talegaon Dabhade, Talegaon Station, Paisa Fund, Urse Phata, Talegaon Toll Plaza, Vasudev Ashram	Nigdi	
342	Nigdi	Urse Gaon	Bhakti Shakti, Garden City, Dehu Road, Begdewadi, Shelarwadi, Somatane Phata, Somatane, Parandwadi, Finolex Pipes, Vasudev Ashram	Nigdi	
343	Chakan (Ambethan Chowk)	Talegaon Dabhade	Talegaon Chowk, Kharabwadi, Talkhed, Lumax Company, Mahalunge Ingale, Volkswagen Company, H.P Chowk, Khalumbre, Sudhavwadi, Indori, Malwadi, Talegaon Railway Station	Bhosari	
343A	Bhosari	Talegaon Dabhade	Sadgurunagar, Gandharv Nagari, Moshi Marketyard, Moshi, Chimbali Phata, Kurali, Alandi Phata, Chakan, Talegaon Chowk, Kharabwadi, Talkhed, Lumax Company, Mahalunge Ingale, Volkswagen Company, H.P Chowk, Khalumbre, Sudhavwadi, Indori, Malwadi, Talegaon Railway Station	Bhosari	
344	Baner Depot	Alandi	Baner Gaon, Balewadi Phata, Chakankar Mala, Jupiter Hospital, Pimple Nilakh, Vishal Nagar, Kaspate Vasti, Kalewadi Phata, Tapkir Chowk, Kalewadi, Pimpri, Shagun Chowk, PCMC, Pimpri Road, H.A Grounds, Nehru Nagar Corner, YCM Hospital, Landewadi, Gavhane Vasti, PMT Chowk, Bhosari, Shastri Chowk, Magazine Chowk, Sai Mandir, Charholi Phata, Dehu Phata	Baner	
344A	Sus Gaon	Alandi	Tapkir Vasti, Girme Park, Radha Chowk Baner, Baner Depot, Baner Gaon, Balewadi Phata, Chakankar Mala, Jupiter Hospital, Pimple Nilakh, Vishal Nagar, Kaspate Vasti, Kalewadi Phata, Tapkir Chowk, Kalewadi, Pimpri, Shagun Chowk, PCMC, Pimpri Road, H.A Grounds, Nehru Nagar Corner, YCM Hospital, Landewadi, Gavhane Vasti, PMT Chowk, Bhosari, Shastri Chowk, Magazine Chowk, Sai Mandir, Charholi Phata, Dehu Phata	Charholi	
345	Hinjewadi Ph.3	Bhosari	Gangaramwadi Circle, Infosys Phase 2, Wipro Circle, Mezza Nine, Hinjewadi Chowk, Wakad Bridge, Wakad, Mankar Chowk, Jagtap Dairy, Shivar Chowk, Kokane Chowk, Nashik Phata, Bhosari MIDC, Landewadi	Baner	
346	Bhosari	Wagholi	Shastri Chowk, Magazine Chowk, Dighi, Kalas, Vishrantwadi, Bhairav Nagar, Kamal Park, Dhanori, Kalwad, Lohegaon, Dadachi Padal, Diamond Waterpark, Kesnand Phata	Wagholi	
348	Pune Station	Nigdi Bhakti Shakti	Gadital Juna Bazar, RTO Office, Shivaji Nagar, Mhasoba Gate, University Gate, Bremen Chowk, Aundh, Sangvi Phata, Rakshak Chowk, Jagtap Dairy, Kalewadi Phata, Dange Chowk, Chaphekar Chowk, SKF Company, Bhoir Nagar, Akurdi Chowk, Nigdi	Nigdi	
349	Bhosari	Nighoje Gaon	Sadgurunagar, Gandharv Nagari, Moshi Marketyard, Moshi, Chimbali Phata, Kurali, Alandi Phata, Nighoje Phata, Bajaj Chowk, Mercedes Chowk, Skoda Company, Sigma Company, Mahalunge MIDC	Bhosari	
350	Nigdi	Dehu Gaon	Yamuna Nagar, Triveni Nagar, Talawade, Tukaram Nagar, Vitthalwadi	Nigdi	
351	Jambe	Alandi	Rasikwadi, Nere Phata, Punawale, Dattawadi, Tathawade, Dange Chowk, Chaphekar Chowk, Chinchwad Gaon, Lokmanya Hospital, Chinchwad Station, Mohan Nagar, KSB Chowk, Telco Road, Yashwant Nagar, Gavli Matha, Indrayani Nagar, Landewadi, PMT Chowk, Bhosari, Shastri Chowk, Magazine Chowk, Sai Mandir, Charholi Phata, Dehu Phata	Bhosari	
352	Pune Station	Rajgurunagar	Gadital Juna Bazar, RTO Office, Patil Estate, Wakdewadi, Khadki, Bopodi, Dapodi, Phugewadi, Kasarwadi, Nashik Phata, Bhosari MIDC, Landewadi, PMT Chowk, Bhosari, Sadgurunagar, Gandharv Nagari, Moshi Marketyard, Moshi, Chimbali Phata, Kurali, Alandi Phata, Chakan, Talegaon Chowk, Ambethan Chowk, Ekta Nagar, Waki Khurd, Bham, Shiroli, Kharpudi, Rajgurunagar ST Stand	Bhosari	
353	Bhosari	Shikrapur	Sadgurunagar, Gandharv Nagari, Moshi Marketyard, Moshi, Chimbali Phata, Kurali, Alandi Phata, Chakan, Talegaon Chowk, Kadachiwadi, Rase Phata, Bhose, Shelgaon, Shel Pimpalgaon, Mohitewadi, Bahulgaon, Sabalewadi, Kendur Chouphula, Pimple Jagtap, Jategaon	Bhosari	
354	Marketyard	Pimpri Gaon	Gultekdi, Bhapkar Petrol Pump, Swargate, Shanipar, ABC, Manapa Bhavan, Shivaji Nagar, Mhasoba Gate, University Gate, Bremen Chowk, Aundh, Sangvi Phata, BG College, Navi Sangvi, Katepuram, Pimple Gurav, Sudarshan Nagar, Kokane Chowk, Nakhate Vasti, Rahatani, Tapkir Chowk, Kalewadi	Pimpri	
355	Dange Chowk	Chikhali	Chaphekar Chowk, Chinchwad Gaon, SKF Company, Bhoir Nagar, Akurdi Chowk, Nigdi, Yamuna Nagar, Ajantha Nagar, Krushna Nagar, Sane Chowk, Patil Nagar	Balewadi & Pimpri	
355A	Radha Chowk (Baner)	Chikhali	Balewadi Stadium, Wakad Bridge, Bhumkar Chowk, Dange Chowk, Chaphekar Chowk, Chinchwad Gaon, SKF Company, Bhoir Nagar, Akurdi Chowk, Nigdi, Yamuna Nagar, Ajantha Nagar, Krushna Nagar, Sane Chowk, Patil Nagar	Balewadi	
356	Nashik Phata Metro Station	P.M.A.Y Homes Sector 12	Vallabh Nagar, Sant Tukaram Nagar, YCM Hospital, Bhosari MIDC, Landewadi, PMT Chowk, Bhosari, Sadgurunagar, Indrayani Nagar, Sant Nagar, Khande Vasti	Bhosari	
357	Pune Station	Bhosari	Gadital Juna Bazar, RTO Office, Patil Estate, Wakdewadi, Khadki, Bopodi, Dapodi, Phugewadi, Kasarwadi, Nashik Phata, Bhosari MIDC, Landewadi, PMT Chowk	Pune Station	
358	Bhosari	Rajgurunagar	Sadgurunagar, Gandharv Nagari, Moshi Marketyard, Moshi, Chimbali Phata, Kurali, Alandi Phata, Chakan, Talegaon Chowk, Ambethan Chowk, Ekta Nagar, Waki Khurd, Bham, Shiroli, Kharpudi, Rajgurunagar ST Stand	Bhosari	
358A	Bhosari	Vasuli	Sadgurunagar, Gandharv Nagari, Moshi Marketyard, Moshi, Chimbali Phata, Kurali, Alandi Phata, Chakan, Talegaon Chowk, Ambethan Chowk, Biradwadi, Davadmala, Ambethan Gaon, Varale, Bhamboli, Vasuli Phata	Bhosari	
359A	Pimple Gurav	Rajgurunagar	Kalpataru Society, Nashik Phata, Bhosari MIDC, Landewadi, PMT Chowk, Bhosari, Sadgurunagar, Gandharv Nagari, Moshi Marketyard, Moshi, Chimbali Phata, Kurali, Alandi Phata, Chakan, Talegaon Chowk, Ambethan Chowk, Ekta Nagar, Waki Khurd, Bham, Shiroli, Kharpudi, Rajgurunagar ST Stand	Bhosari	
360	Chande Gaon	Alandi	Nande Gaon, Bajirao Padale Chowk, Mahalunge Gaon, Radha Chowk Baner, Balewadi Depot, Moze Vidyalaya, Balewadi Gaon, Chakankar Mala, Balewadi Phata, Baner Gaon, Baner Phata, Sanewadi ITI, Parihar Chowk, Aundh, Sangvi Phata, BG College, Navi Sangvi, Katepuram, Pimple Gurav, Kalpataru Society, Nashik Phata, Bhosari MIDC, Landewadi, PMT Chowk, Bhosari, Shastri Chowk, Magazine Chowk, Charholi Phata, Dehu Phata	Baner	
360A	Aundh Gaon	Alandi	Sangvi Phata, BG College, Navi Sangvi, Katepuram, Pimple Gurav, Kalpataru Society, Nashik Phata, Bhosari MIDC, Landewadi, PMT Chowk, Bhosari, Shastri Chowk, Magazine Chowk, Charholi Phata, Dehu Phata	Balewadi	
361	Bhosari	Alandi	Shastri Chowk, Magazine Chowk, Charholi Phata, Dehu Phata	Bhosari	
362	YCM Hospital	Alandi	Nehru Nagar, Indrayani Nagar, Landewadi, Gavhane Vasti, Bhosari, Shastri Chowk, Magazine Chowk, Charholi Phata, Dehu Phata	Pimpri	
363	Pimpri Road	Datta Nagar Kiwale	PCMC, Chinchwad Station, Kalbhor Nagar, Akurdi Chowk, Nigdi, Bhakti Shakti, Garden City, Dehu Road, Dehu Road Bazar, Vikas Nagar, Mukai Chowk, Adarsh Nagar	Nigdi	
364	Chakan Ambethan Chowk	Ajeenkya DY Patil College (Lohegaon)	Talegaon Chowk, Alandi Phata, Suman Company, Hanumanwadi, MIT School, Alandi, Charholi Khurd, Charholi Budruk, Kotwalwadi, Pathare Chowk, Pride World City	Charholi	
365	Nigdi	Mukai Chowk Kiwale	Bhakti Shakti, Transport Nagar, Appu Ghar, Bhondve Patil Estate, Adarsh Nagar	Nigdi	
365A	Nigdi	IIIT Campus Nanoli	Bhakti Shakti, Garden City, Dehu Road, Begdewadi, Shelarwadi, Somatane Phata, Tukaram Nagar, Ghorawadi, Talegaon Dabhade, Talegaon Railway Station, Paisa Fund, Urse Phata, Katvi, Ambi, Nanoli	Nigdi	
366	Pune Station	Nigdi Bhakti Shakti	Bund Garden, Yerwada, Deccan College, Khadki Cantonment, Khadki Bazar, Bopodi, Dapodi, Phugewadi, Kasarwadi, Nashik Phata, Vallabh Nagar, Kharalwadi Corner, Pimpri Road, PCMC, Chinchwad Station, Kalbhor Nagar, Akurdi Chowk, Nigdi	Pune Station	
367	Bhosari (Gavhane Vasti)	Mukai Chowk Kiwale	Landewadi, Indrayani Nagar, Telco Road, KSB Chowk, Thermax Chowk, Yamuna Nagar, Nigdi, Bhakti Shakti, Transport Nagar, Big India, Akurdi, Akurdi Railway Station, DY Patil College, Bhondve Corner, Ravet	Bhosari	
368	Nigdi	Lonavala	Bhakti Shakti, Garden City, Dehu Road, Begdewadi, Shelarwadi, Somatane Phata, Tukaram Nagar, Ghorawadi, Talegaon Dabhade, Talegaon Railway Station, Paisa Fund, Urse Phata, Vadgaon Maval, Mali Nagar, Kanhe, Khadkale, Naigaon, Kamshet, Pathargaon, Wet n Joy Waterpark, Shilatane, Karla, Waksai, Valvan	Nigdi	
369	Nigdi	Vasuli	Yamuna Nagar, Triveni Nagar, Talawade, Tukaram Nagar, Fujitsu Company, Indrayani Pul, Mahindra Company, Sigma Chowk, Mahalunge MIDC, H.P Chowk, Honda Company, Sawardari, Vasuli Phata	Nigdi	
370	Bhosari	Davadi	Sadgurunagar, Gandharv Nagari, Moshi Marketyard, Moshi, Chimbali Phata, Kurali, Alandi Phata, Chakan, Talegaon Chowk, Ambethan Chowk, Ekta Nagar, Waki Khurd, Bham, Shiroli, Kharpudi, Rajgurunagar, Rakshewadi, Manjarewadi, Kharpudi Budruk, Nimgaon	Bhosari	
371	Nigdi	Bhoyare Gaon	Bhakti Shakti, Garden City, Dehu Road, Begdewadi, Shelarwadi, Somatane Phata, Tukaram Nagar, Ghorawadi, Talegaon Dabhade, Talegaon Railway Station, Paisa Fund, Urse Phata, Vadgaon Maval, Mali Nagar, Kanhe, Kanhe Railway Station, Mahindra Company, Takave Budruk, Phalane, Kondiwade	Nigdi	
372	Hinjewadi Ph.3	Nigdi Bhakti Shakti	Gangaramwadi Circle, Infosys Phase 2, Wipro Circle, Mezza Nine, Hinjewadi Chowk, Bhumkar Chowk, Dange Chowk, Chaphekar Chowk, Chinchwad Gaon, SKF Company, Bhoir Nagar, Akurdi Chowk, Nigdi	Nigdi	
373	Neilsoft Company (Hinjewadi)	Sangvi	Gangaramwadi Circle, Infosys Phase 2, Wipro Circle, Mezza Nine, Hinjewadi Chowk, Wakad Bridge, Wakad, Mankar Chowk, Kaspate Vasti, Kalewadi Phata, Rahatani, Nakhate Vasti, Pimple Saudagar, Sudarshan Nagar, Pimple Gurav, Katepuram, Navi Sangvi, Juni Sangvi	Maan-Hinjewadi	
374	Nigdi	Sainagar (Mamurdi)	Bhakti Shakti, Garden City, Dehu Road, Dehu Road Bazar, Shitala Nagar, Mamurdi, MCA Cricket Stadium, Waghjai Society	Nigdi	
374A	Nigdi	Gahunje Gaon	Bhakti Shakti, Garden City, Dehu Road, Dehu Road Bazar, Shitala Nagar, Mamurdi, MCA Cricket Stadium	Nigdi	
375	Neilsoft Company (Hinjewadi)	Nigdi	Gangaramwadi Circle, Infosys Phase 2, Wipro Circle, Laxmi Chowk, Marunji, Kolte Patil Township, Koyte Vasti, Punawale, Kiwale Gaon, Mukai Chowk, Adarsh Nagar, Bhondve Patil Estate, Appu Ghar, Transport Nagar, Bhakti Shakti	Maan-Hinjewadi	
376	Manapa Bhavan	Pimpri Gaon	Shivaji Nagar, Patil Estate, Wakdewadi, Khadki, Bopodi, Dapodi, Phugewadi, Kasarwadi, Nashik Phata, Vallabh Nagar, Sant Tukaram Nagar, YCM Hospital, Nehru Nagar, H.A Grounds, Pimpri Road, Shagun Chowk	Pimpri	
376A	Shewalewadi	Dehu Gaon	Manjari Phata, Hadapsar, Magarpatta, Mundhwa, Kharadi Bypass, Chandan Nagar, Viman Nagar, Ramwadi, Don Bosco School, Yerwada, Nagpur Chawl, 509 Chowk, Tingre Nagar, Vishrantwadi, Kalas, Dighi, Magazine Chowk, Shastri Chowk, Bhosari, Sadgurunagar, Gandharv Nagari, Moshi Marketyard, Moshi, Moi Phata, Patil Nagar, Chikhali, Talawade, Tukaram Nagar, Vitthalwadi	Shewalewadi	
377	Pimpri Road	Ghotawade Phata	Shagun Chowk, Pimpri, Kalewadi, Tapkir Chowk, Kalewadi Phata, Kaspate Vasti, Mankar Chowk, Wakad, Wakad Bridge, Balewadi Stadium, Radha Chowk, Girme Park, Bitwise Tower, Tapkir Vasti, Sus Gaon, Nande Gaon, Lavale, Rautwadi, Pirangut	Pimpri	
379	Nigdi	Nighoje Gaon	Yamuna Nagar, Triveni Nagar, Talawade, Tukaram Nagar, Fujitsu Company, Indrayani Pul, Mahindra Company	Nigdi	
380	Hinjewadi Ph.3	Bhosari	Gangaramwadi Circle, Infosys Phase 2, Wipro Circle, Mezza Nine, Hinjewadi Chowk, Wakad Bridge, Wakad, Mankar Chowk, Kaspate Vasti, Kalewadi Phata, Tapkir Chowk, Kalewadi, Pimpri Gaon, Shagun Chowk, PCMC, Pimpri Road, H.A Grounds, Nehru Nagar Corner, YCM Hospital, Bhosari MIDC, Landewadi, Gavhane Vasti	Bhosari	
381	Hinjewadi Ph.3	Chikhali	Gangaramwadi Circle, Infosys Phase 2, Wipro Circle, Mezza Nine, Hinjewadi Chowk, Wakad Bridge, Wakad, Mankar Chowk, Kaspate Vasti, Kalewadi Phata, Tapkir Chowk, Kalewadi, Vijay Nagar, Empire Estate, Mohan Nagar, KSB Chowk, Telco Company, Shahu Nagar, Kudalwadi, Patil Nagar	Baner & Nigdi	
383	Sangvi	Chandkhed	Juni Sangvi, BG College, Sangvi Phata, Rakshak Chowk, Wakad Phata, Vishal Nagar, Mankar Chowk, Wakad, Wakad Bridge, Hinjewadi Chowk, Hinjewadi Phase 1, Mezza Nine, Laxmi Chowk, Marunji, Nere, Kasarsai, Pachane Phata	Balewadi	
384 (RING)	Chakan Ambethan Chowk	Chakan Ambethan Chowk	Talegaon Chowk, Kurali Phata, Nighoje Phata, Sigma Chowk, Mahindra Company, Mahalunge Ingale, Kharabwadi	Pimpri	
385 (RING)	Chakan Ambethan Chowk	Chakan Ambethan Chowk	Kharabwadi, Mahalunge Ingale, H.P Chowk, Sigma Chowk, Nighoje Phata, Talegaon Chowk	Pimpri	
387	Bhosari	Siddhant College (Sudumbre)	Sadgurunagar, Gandharv Nagari, Moshi Marketyard, Moshi, Moi Phata, Chikhali, Patil Nagar, Talawade, Tukaram Nagar, Vitthalwadi, Dehu Gaon, Yelwadi, Sudumbre	Bhosari	
388	Bhosari	Dighi	Shastri Chowk, Bharatmata Nagar, Magazine Chowk	Bhosari	
SHATAL-1	Pune Station	Chakan (Ambethan Chowk)	Gadital Juna Bazar, RTO Office, Patil Estate, Wakdewadi, Khadki, Bopodi, Dapodi, Phugewadi, Kasarwadi, Nashik Phata, Bhosari MIDC, Landewadi, PMT Chowk, Bhosari, Sadgurunagar, Gandharv Nagari, Moshi Marketyard, Moshi, Chimbali Phata, Kurali, Alandi Phata, Chakan, Talegaon Chowk	Na.Ta.Wadi	
SHATAL-1A	Pune Station	Talegaon Dabhade	Gadital Juna Bazar, RTO Office, Patil Estate, Wakdewadi, Khadki, Bopodi, Dapodi, Phugewadi, Kasarwadi, Nashik Phata, Vallabh Nagar, Kharalwadi Corner, Pimpri Road, PCMC, Chinchwad Station, Kalbhor Nagar, Akurdi Chowk, Nigdi, Bhakti Shakti, Garden City, Dehu Road, Begdewadi, Shelarwadi, Somatane Phata, Tukaram Nagar, Ghorawadi	Na.Ta.Wadi	

== ATAL & Metro Feeder Bus Routes ==
Route number	Origin	Destination	Via	Depot	Ref
AP2	Upper Depot	Katraj	Sukhsagar Nagar, Khandoba Mandir, Rajas Society	Upper	
B1	PCMC Metro Station	Dighi	H.A Grounds, Nehru Nagar Corner, YCM Hospital, Bhosari MIDC, Landewadi, Gavhane Vasti, PMT Chowk, Bhosari, Shastri Chowk, Bharatmata Nagar	Bhosari	
B2	Alandi	DY Patil College (Lohegaon)	Dehu Phata, Charholi Phata, Dabhade Vasti, Charholi, Pride World City Lohegaon	Bhosari	
H8	Hadapsar	Phursungi	Gondhale Nagar, Shiv Shakti Chowk, Harpale Vasti	Hadapsar	
H9	Hadapsar	Manjari Budruk	Manjari Phata, Mahadev Nagar, Ghule Vasti, Dhere Bungalow, Gopalpatti, Manjari Railway Station	Hadapsar	
H11	Hadapsar	Sanket Vihar	Kalepadal, Sasane Nagar, Railway Crossing, Kaleborate Nagar, Dhere Company	Hadapsar	
H11A	Hadapsar	JSPM School (Adarsh Nagar)	Kalepadal, Sasane Nagar, Railway Crossing, Kaleborate Nagar, Satav Nagar	Hadapsar	
K7	Deccan Gymkhana	Sneha Vihar (Dangat Patil Nagar)	Garware College, Nalstop, Karve Road, Kothrud Stand, Karve Nagar, Galinde Path, Warje Gaon, Ram Nagar	Kothrud	
K11	Katraj	Jambhulwadi	Santosh Nagar, Datta Nagar, Shani Nagar	Katraj	
K12	Katraj	Nandanvan City (Narhe)	Santosh Nagar, Datta Nagar, Dalvi Nagar, Ambegaon, Bhumkar Nagar, Shree Control, Abhinav College, Narhe Gaon	Katraj	
K13	Katraj	JSPM College (Narhe Gaon)	Santosh Nagar, Datta Nagar, Dalvi Nagar, Ambegaon, Bhumkar Nagar	Katraj	
K14	Katraj	Gujarwadi	Gujarwadi PMT Stand, Jadhav Nagar, Nimbalkar Nagar, Kadam Bungalow	Katraj	
K16	Katraj	Yewalewadi	Gokul Nagar, ISKCON Mandir, Kamthe Nagar	Katraj	
K18	Katraj	Waghjai Nagar	Santosh Nagar, Aanchal Society, Hari Om Colony	Katraj	
K21 (RING)	Vanaz Metro Station	Vanaz Metro Station	Kothrud Depot, Chandni Chowk, LMD Chowk, DSK Ranwara, Bavdhan, D Palace, Chandni Chowk, Kothrud Depot	Kothrud	
MS2	District Court Metro Station	Warje Malwadi	Shaniwar Wada, Vasant Talkies, ABC, Kesari Wada, Narayan Peth, Alka Talkies, Deccan Corner, Garware College, Nalstop, Karve Road, Kothrud Stand, Karve Nagar, Galinde Path	Kothrud	
MS3	Vanaz Metro Station	Warje Malwadi	Kothrud Depot, Chandni Chowk, Rahul Park, Sai Sayaji Nagar, Warje Bridge	Kothrud	
MS13	Swargate	Upper Depot	Bhapkar Petrol Pump, Vasantbaug, Bibwewadi	Upper	
MS17	District Court Metro Station	Hadapsar	Shivaji Nagar, Manapa Bhavan, Gadital Juna Bazar, Pune Station, Westend, Camp, Pulgate, Fatima Nagar, Ramtekdi	Hadapsar	
MS20	Ramwadi Metro Station	Dhole Patil College (Kharadi)	Viman Nagar, Chandan Nagar, Kharadi Bypass, EON IT Park, Gera Society	Bhekrainagar	
MS20A	Bhekrainagar	Ramwadi Metro Station	Hadapsar, Magarpatta, Seasons Mall, Mundhwa, Kharadi Bypass, Chandan Nagar, Viman Nagar	Bhekrainagar	
MS22	Hadapsar	Kalyani Nagar Metro Station	Hadapsar, Magarpatta City, Seasons Mall, Mundhwa, Lonkar Colony, Tadigutta, Koregaon Park Corner, Kalyani Nagar	Hadapsar	
MS31	PCMC Metro Station	Wakad Chowk Metro Station	Pimpri Chowk, Shagun Chowk, Pimpri Gaon, Kalewadi, Tapkir Chowk, Kalewadi Phata, Kaspate Vasti, Mankar Chowk, Wakad	Pimpri	
MS32	Nashik Phata Metro Station	Nigdi Bhakti Shakti	Vallabh Nagar, Sant Tukaram Nagar, YCM Hospital, Nehru Nagar Corner, H.A Grounds, Pimpri Road, PCMC, Chinchwad Station, Kalbhor Nagar, Akurdi Chowk, Nigdi	Nigdi	
MS41	TCS-Maan Metro Station	Neilsoft Company (Hinjewadi Phase 3)	Megapolis Society, Tata Company, Bhoirwadi	Maan-Hinjewadi	
MS42	TCS-Maan Metro Station	Mahalunge (Padale Chowk)	Maan Metro Depot, Maan Gaon, Thakar Nagar, Pandav Nagar, Thakar Chowk (Maan Road), VTP Aethereus Society	Maan-Hinjewadi	
MS43	TCS-Maan Metro Station	Podar International School (Bhoirwadi Hinjewadi)	Megapolis Society, TCS Gate, Bhoirwadi	Maan-Hinjewadi	
MS44	Chhatrapati Shivaji Maharaj Chowk (Hinjewadi) Metro Station	Indira College (Tathawade)	Infosys Phase 1, Mezza Nine, Laxmi Chowk, Silver Spoon Hotel, Akshara International School (Wakad), Shani Mandir	Balewadi	
MS45	Padmabhushan Chowk Metro Station (Phase 2)	Koyte Vasti (Punawale)	Mezza Nine, Laxmi Chowk, Marunji, Kolte Patil Township, Punawale	Balewadi	
MS46	TCS-Maan Metro Station	Lavale Phata (Pirangut)	Megapolis Society, Godambewadi, Shelkewadi, Rihe Phata, Bhare Phata, Pirangut, Ghotawade Phata	Maan-Hinjewadi	
MS46A	MITCON-Balewadi Metro Station	Lavale Phata (Pirangut)	Balewadi Depot, Radha Chowk, Mahalunge Gaon, Bajirao Padale Chowk, Delhi Public School, Nande Gaon, Shitole Vasti, Lavale, Rautwadi	Balewadi	
MS47	TCS-Maan Metro Station	Blue Ridge Society (Hinjewadi Phase 1)	Hinjewadi Phase 3, Maan Metro Depot, Maan Gaon, Thakar Nagar, Pandav Nagar, Infosys Phase 1, Mahindra International School	Maan-Hinjewadi	
MS48	MITCON-Balewadi Metro Station	Girme Park	Moze Vidyalaya, Dasara Chowk, Balewadi High Street, Kalamkar Vasti (Baner), Murkute Park/Bitwise	Balewadi	
MS49	Hinjewadi Phase 2 Metro Station	Embassy Techzone Parking	Infosys Phase 2, Wipro Circle, Wipro Parking	Maan-Hinjewadi	
MS50	MITCON-Balewadi Metro Station	Chande Gaon	Balewadi Depot, Radha Chowk, Mahalunge Stadium, Mahalunge Gaon, Mahalunge (Padale Chowk), DPS Mahalunge, Nande Gaon	Balewadi	
MS51	Indira College (Tathawade)	Joyville Society (Maan)		Balewadi	
N14	Chinchwad Gaon	Symbiosis University (Gahunje)	Chaphekar Chowk, Walhekarwadi, Munjaba Vasahat, Chinchwade Farm, Bhondve Corner, DY Patil College, Shinde Vasti, Mauli Park, SSPMS College, Ravet, Samir Lawns, Kiwale Gaon	Pimpri	
N15	Nigdi	Rupee Nagar	Bhakti Shakti, Ankush Chowk, Kalbhor Gotha	Nigdi	
N16	Akurdi Chowk	Chikhali	Thermax Chowk, Sane Chowk, Patil Nagar	Nigdi	
P13	PCMC Metro Station	Walhekarwadi	Shagun Chowk, Bhat Nagar, Link Road, Chinchwad Gaon, Chaphekar Chowk, Walhekwarwadi, Chinchwade Nagar, Sayali Park	Pimpri	

== Fare ==
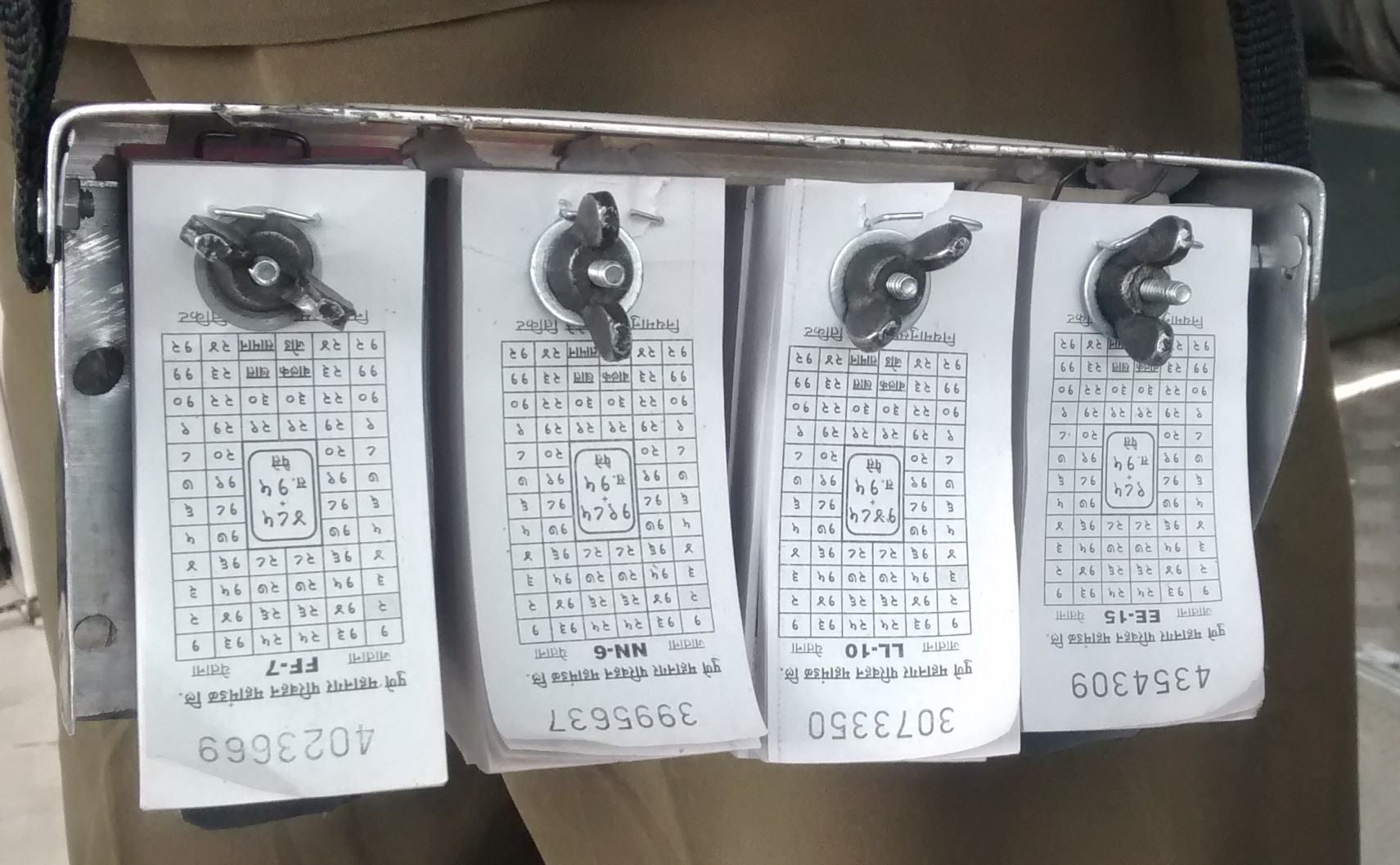
A PMPML ticket box

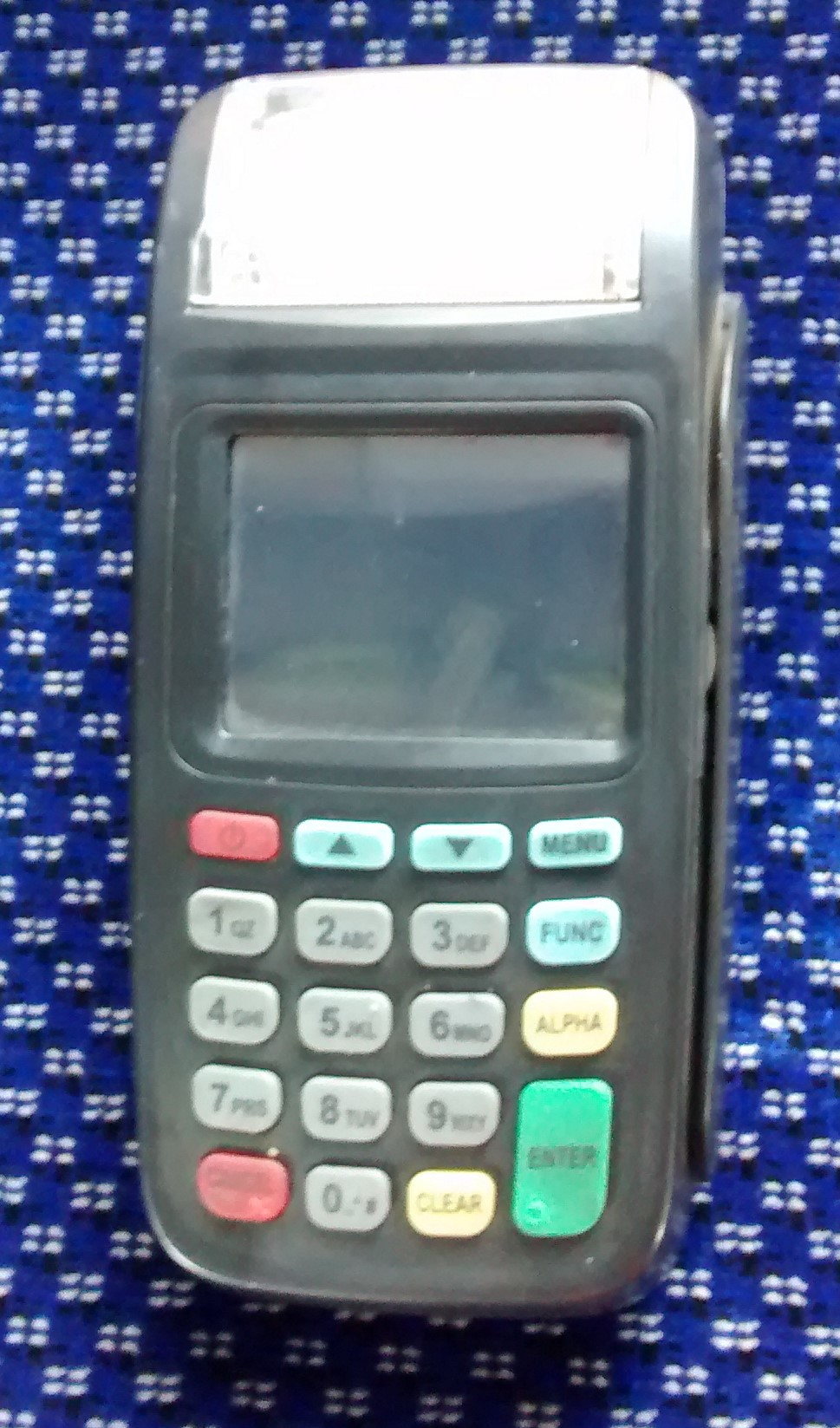
An electronic ticketing machine

Single Ticket Fare Chart (April 2018)
Distance (km)	Fare (₹)			
Distance (km)	Full		Half (Children aged 3 to 12 years)	
Distance (km)	Regular	Night	Regular	Night
0-2	5	10	5	5
2-8	10	15	5	10
8-12	15	20	10	10
12-16	20	25	10	15
16-22	25	30	15	15
22-28	30	35	15	20
28-34	35	40	15	20
34-40	40	45	20	25
40-44	45	50	20	25
44-52	50	55	25	30
52-56	55	60	25	30
>56	60	65	30	35

Single journey tickets are valid for a single trip between any two points. They are issued as paper tickets and are to be bought on board from the conductor. The fare depends on the distance of travel (see table below) and needs to be paid in cash. Children between the ages of three and twelve years travel at reduced fares, called 'half ticket', while no fares are charged for children younger than three. Fares on the night bus services are higher.

PMPML offers daily, weekly, fortnightly, quarterly and annual traveling passes to make journeys convenient for its passengers. Discounted passes are also there for elderly passengers, visually and physically challenged, reporters and freedom fighters. All passes can be obtained both online and offline. A pass can only be used in conjunction with an identity card issued by the PMPML at a cost of ₹ 20 (+ ₹ 5 for application). As of April 2018, a monthly pass valid for a month on all routes costs ₹ 1,400, while students and senior citizens need to pay ₹ 750 and ₹ 500, respectively. A day pass valid on all routes costs ₹ 70 and can only be obtained on board.

== Depots ==
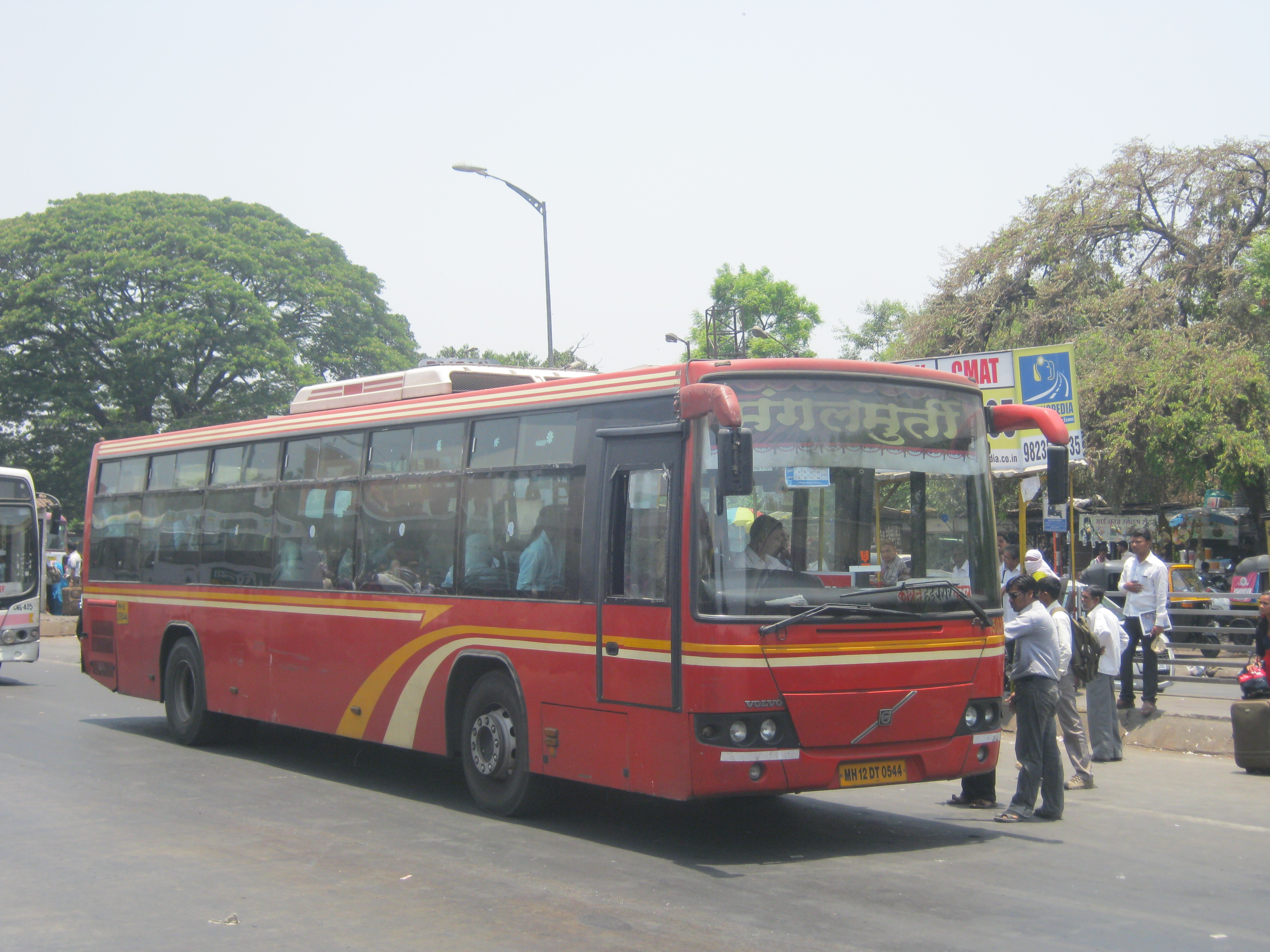
A PMPML Volvo at Swargate Bus Station.

PMPML currently has 14 operational bus depots.

Sr.	Depot name
1	Swargate
2	Narveer Tanaji Wadi (Na.Ta.Wadi)
3	Kothrud
4	Katraj
5	Hadapsar
6	Balewadi
7	Pune Railway Station Electric Depot, Pune Railway Station
8	Bhakti Shakti Electric Depot, Nigdi
9	Nehrunagar, Pimpri
10	Sadgurunagar, Bhosari
11	Baner Electric Depot, Baner
12	Wagholi Electric Depot, Wagholi
13	Bhekrainagar Electric Depot, Bhekraingar
14	Shewalewadi, Shewalewadi
15	Charholi (Electric)
16	Hinjewadi (Electric)
17	Upper
18	Ravet (Proposed)
19	Moshi (Proposed)
20	Pulgate (Proposed)

== Issues ==
=== Operational losses ===
PMPML has been incurring heavy operational losses ever since its formation in 2007. As per the merger contract, the PMC and PCMC bear 60% and 40% of the losses respectively. There have been disputes between the two civic bodies resulting in demands for dissolving the PMPML to form PMT and PCMT as they existed before 2007.

=== Insufficient fleet and poor maintenance ===
PMPML is the sole public transport provider for the metropolitan area surrounding the twin cities of Pune and Pimpri-Chinchwad with a population of 5,057,709. PMPML had a fleet of 1450 buses of which on an average only 1277 were operational. Thus at any given moment, c. 34% of its fleet was off roads, way above the limit of 20% per the norms set by the Central Institute of Road Transport (CIRT). This put the ratio of operational buses at c. 27 per 100,000 population. Reasons for these buses being off roads are mainly related to maintenance and frequent breakdowns due to several factors including insufficient manpower and facilities at PMPML depots and lack of preventive maintenance. PMPML also has a number of buses that are owned and maintained by private contractors which also suffer poor maintenance. Moreover, a significant number of buses in the fleet are older than 15 years while 746 buses are 10–15 years old making them prone to frequent breakdowns. Insufficient buses inevitably lead to overcrowding on the buses during peak hours with as many as three times the capacity riding a single bus.

To alleviate the problem of insufficient buses, PMPML had decided to buy 800 new diesel buses in 2017 postponing its initial plan of buying 550 air conditioned buses. The decision drew severe criticism regarding the environmental impact of diesel buses. Several NGOs and commuter groups suggested that PMPML should buy CNG buses instead. As a result, it was decided that 400 CNG and 400 diesel-run buses would be bought. However, CM Devendra Fadnavis insisted that PMPML concentrates on eco-friendly buses in April 2018. As of May 2018, PMPML planned to buy 500 electric air conditioned buses and 400 CNG buses.

=== Infrastructure ===
PMPML does not have sufficient bus depots which leads to as many as half of the buses being parked on the streets in 2015. The drivers have also been blamed for parking haphazardly leading to traffic snarls in the busy areas of the city. According to a CIRT report, PMPML needs 18 depots as opposed to 13 in 2016–17. Recently, the development of new depots to solve the parking issue has gained some momentum. Bus shelters have been criticized for their condition, lack of seats, information, etc.

=== Safety and accidents ===
In 2017–18, several buses caught fire which has put a big question mark on the safety of commuters. Between January 2017 and March 2018, a period of 15 months, the number of such incidents had reached 16 with almost one incident per month. In an answer to a query submitted under the Right to Information Act, it was revealed that PMPML owns only 124 fire extinguishers and most buses have neither undergone a fire safety audit nor do they have any fire extinguishers. PMPML have claimed that fire extinguishers on the buses are prone to theft. PMPML announced that all of its buses and facilities will undergo a fire safety audit and would be equipped with fire extinguishers by end of May 2018.

== See also ==
- BEST Bus
- MSRTC
- Rainbow BRTS
- Pune Bus Pravasi Sangh
