= Transport in Pune =

Pune is a city in the state of Maharashtra in India. It is situated in western Maharashtra on the Deccan Plateau. Pune's public transport consists primarily of a bus service, a suburban rail service, metro, public taxis and auto rickshaws. In 2020 it was awarded the Sustainable Transport Award.

== Road ==
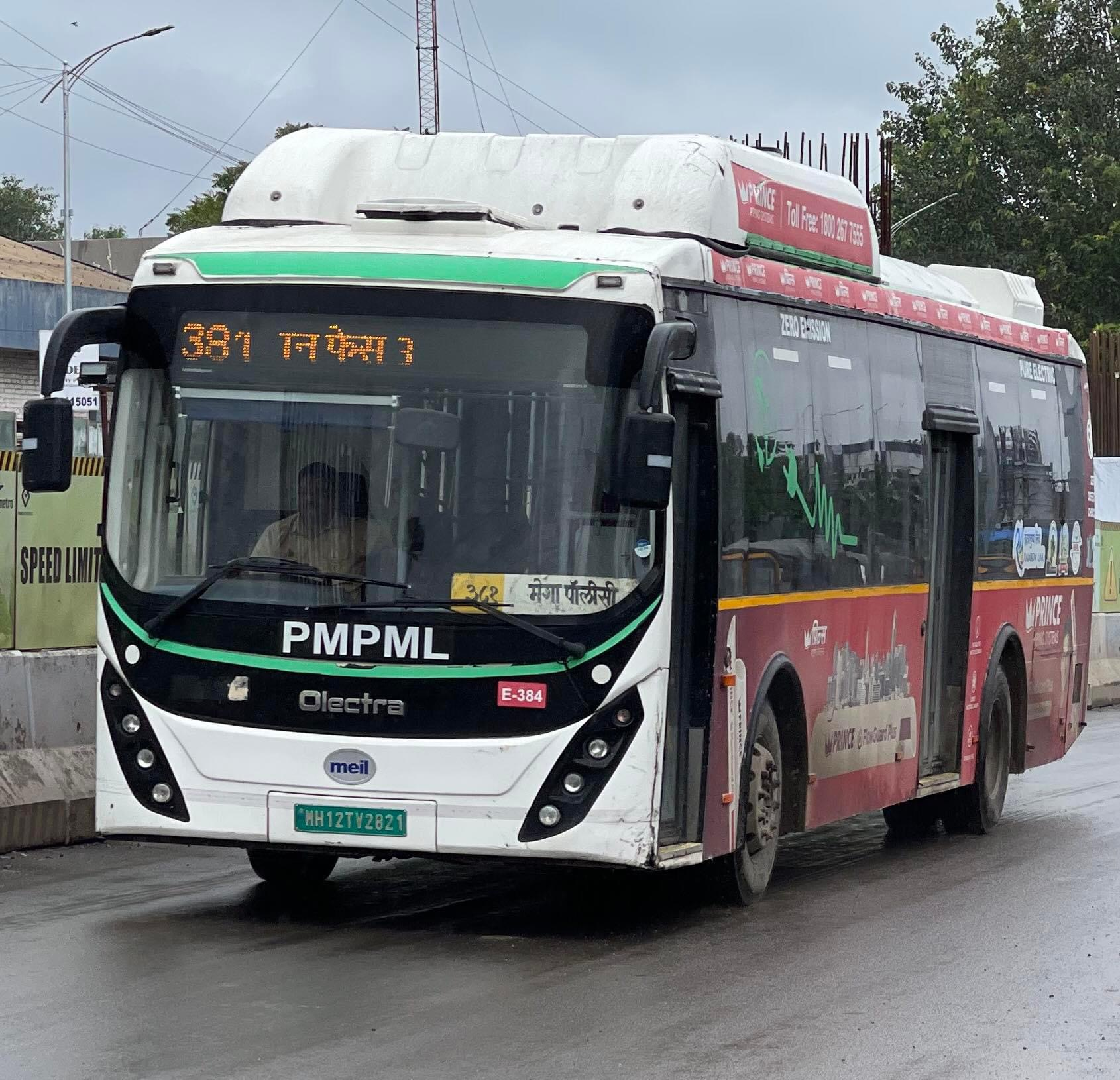
PMPML's Olectra K9D Electric Bus on Route 381 from Chikhali to Hinjewadi Phase 3

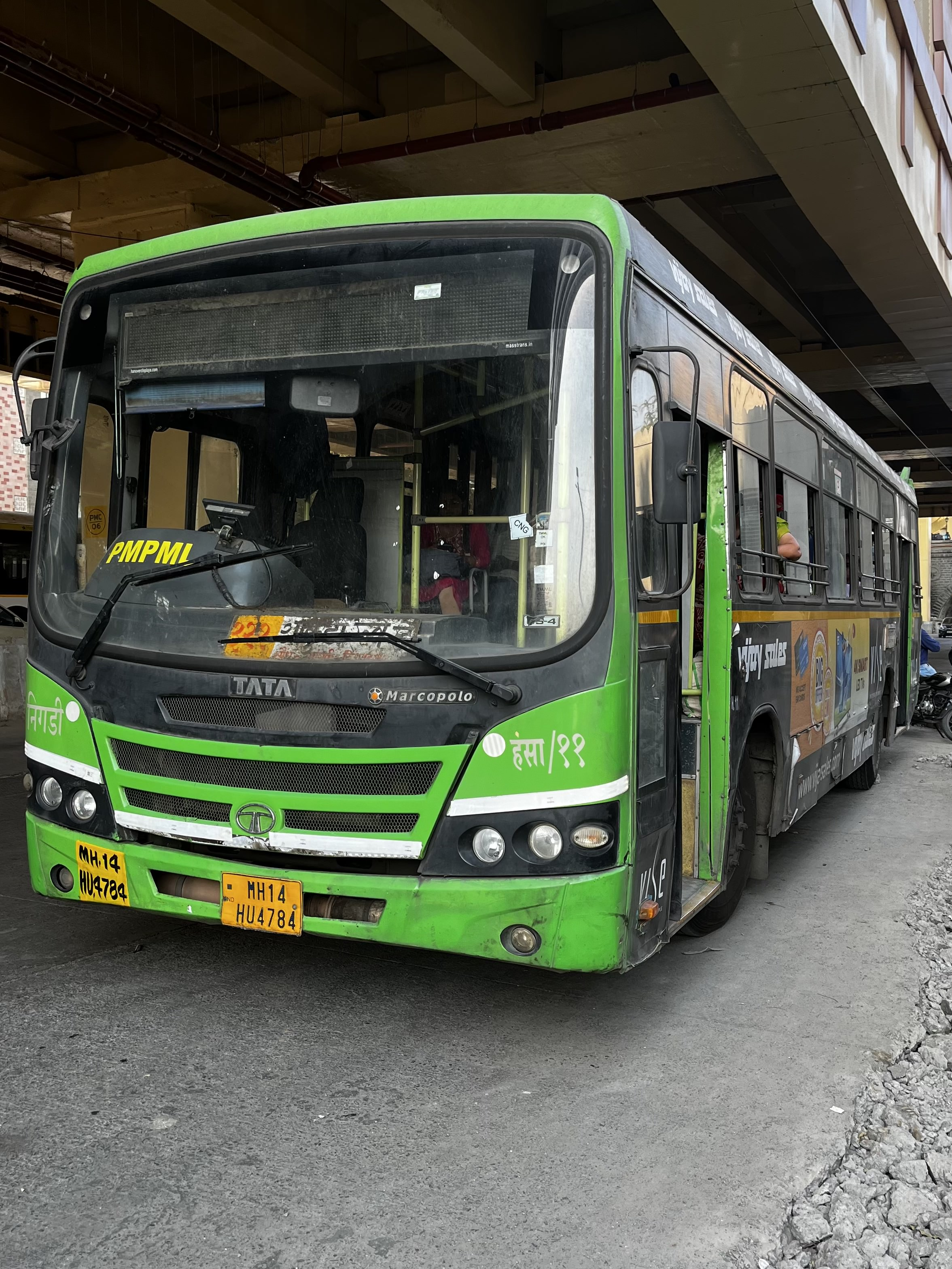
PMPML's Tata Marcopolo CNG Bus resting at PMC Bus Stand

Pune is well-connected to rest of the country by national highways and state highways. National highways passing through the city are NH 48, NH 65 and NH 60. State highways passing through the city are MSH 27. The Mumbai Pune Expressway, India's first six-lane expressway, was built in 2002, and significantly reduces the distance traveled by NH 48 between these cities.

Ring roads are being planned around the city.

=== Bus ===
Public buses within the city and its suburbs are operated by the Pune Mahanagar Parivahan Mahamandal Limited (PMPML). The PMPML operates the Rainbow Bus Rapid Transit System system, the first in India, in which dedicated bus lanes exists to allow buses to travel quicker through the city. Pune is the first city in India to adopt Electric Buses and the first city in India to have an Electric Bus Depot at Bhekrainagar, Hadapsar. PMPML has 13 bus depots in Pune and Pimpri-Chinchwad

=== Bus Routes ===
Here are the listed bus routes of Pune Mahanagar Parivahan Mahamandal Limited (PMPML) in and around Pune and Pimpri-Chinchwad

Route number	Origin	Destination	Via:	Depot:
1/ATAL 1	Pune Station	Shivaji Nagar	Pune Station Depot, GPO, Collector Office, Juna Bazaar, Dengale Pul, PMC	Swargate
2	Shivaji Nagar	Katraj	PMC, Vasant Talkies, Shaniwar Wada, Budhwar Peth, Mandai, Shukrawar Peth, Subhash Nagar, Swargate, Mukund Nagar, Padmavati, Balaji Nagar, Dhankawadi	Katraj
2B/VARTUL	Swargate(Round trip)	Wakdewadi(Round trip)	Sarasbaug, Shanipar, Vishrambaug Wada, Appa Balwant Chowk, Shaniwar Wada, PMC, Shivaji Nagar, Wakdewadi, Shivaji Nagar, COEP, PMC, Vasant Talkies, Shaniwar Wada, Budhwar Peth, Mandai, Shukrawar Peth, Subhash Nagar	Swargate
3/VARTUL	Swargate(Round trip)	Pune Station(Round trip)	Sarasbaug, Tilak Road, Perugate, Narayan Peth, Appa Balwant Chowk, Shaniwar Wada, Phadke Haud, Raviwar Peth, Mangalwar Peth, Somwar Peth, Sassoon Hospital, Pune Station, Pune Station Depot, GPO, Collector Office, Somwar Peth, Phadke Haud, Vasant Talkies, Appa Balwant Chowk, Narayan Peth, Perugate, Hirabaug	Swargate
4/ATAL 4	Shivaji Nagar	Swargate	COEP, Deccan Gymkhana, Alka Talkies, Tilak Road, SP College, Hirabaug	Swargate
5/ATAL 5	Pune Station	Swargate	Pune Station Depot, GPO, Collector Office, Somwar Peth, Rasta Peth, Nana Peth, Nana Peth, Ramoshi Gate	Swargate
6/ATAL 6	Pune Station	Swargate	Pune Station Depot, GPO, Collector Office, Somwar Peth, Seven Loves Chowk, Raviwar Peth, Ghorpade Peth	Swargate
7/ATAL 7	Deccan Gymkhana	Pulgate/M.Gandhi Bus Stn	Alka Talkies, Vishrambaug Wada, Shanipar, Mandai, Shukrawar Peth, Guruwar Peth, Ganj Peth, Ramoshi Gate, Bhawani Peth	Swargate
8/ATAL 8	Pune Station	Deccan Gymkhana	Pune Station Depot, GPO, Collector Office, Somwar Peth, Phadke Haud, Raviwar Peth, Vasant Talkies, Appa Balwant Chowk, Narayan Peth, Pulachi Wadi, Alka Talkies, Deccan Corner	Swargate
10	Shivaji Nagar	Janata Vasahat	COEP, PMC, Shaniwar Wada, Vasant Talkies, Budhwar Peth, Mandai, Shukrawar Peth, Subhash Nagar, Swargate, Sarasbaug, Dandekar Pul, Dattawadi	Na.Ta.Wadi
11	Marketyard	Pimple Gurav	Gultekdi, Mukund Nagar, Swargate, Sarasbaug, Shanipar, Appa Balwant Chowk, Shaniwar Wada, PMC, Shivaji Nagar, Wakdewadi, Khadki, Bopodi, Dapodi, Gangotri Nagar	Upper
12	Upper Depot	Shivaji Nagar	Rajiv Gandhi Nagar, Indira Nagar, Bibwewadi, Vasant Baug, Mukund Nagar, Swargate, Sarasbaug, Dandekar Pul, Lokmanya Nagar, Alka Talkies, Deccan Gymkhana, Goodluck Chowk	Upper
13	Upper Depot	Shivaji Nagar	Rajiv Gandhi Nagar, Indira Nagar, Bibwewadi, Vasant Baug, Mukund Nagar, Swargate, Sarasbaug, Shanipar, Appa Balwant Chowk, Shaniwar Wada, PMC	Upper
15	Bhekrainagar	Dhayari/DSK Vishwa	Tukai Darshan, Satavwadi, Hadapsar, Gadital, Ramtekdi, Fatima Nagar, Bhairoba Nala, Pulgate, Golibar Maidan, Swargate, Sarasbaug, Dandekar Pul, Dattawadi, Vitthalwadi, Hingne Kd, Vadgaon Bk, Garmal, Khadewadi	Bhekrainagar
17	Swargate	Narhe	Sarasbaug, Dandekar Pul, Dattawadi, Vitthalwadi, Hingne Kd, Vadgaon Bk, Manaji Nagar	Swargate
19	Swargate	Yewalewadi	Mukund Nagar, Maharshi Nagar, Marketyard, Lulla Nagar, Kausar Baug, Kondhwa, Khadi Machine Chowk, Kondhwa Bk, Antulya Nagar	Swargate
21	Swargate	Sangvi	Sarasbaug, Shanipar, Appa Balwant Chowk, Shaniwar Wada, PMC, Shivaji Nagar, Mhasoba Gate, Pune University Gate, NCL, Sakal Nagar, Sanewadi, I.T.I, Parihar Chowk, Aundh, Sangvi Phata, Navi Sangvi, Juni Sangvi	Swargate
24	Katraj	Maharashtra Housing Board/Yerwada	Dhankawadi, Balaji Nagar, Padmavati, Natubaug Mukund Nagar, Swargate, Seven Loves Chowk, Ramoshi Gate, Nana Peth, Rasta Peth, Mangalwar Peth, Sassoon Hospital, Pune Station, Ruby Hall Clinic, Bund Garden, Yerwada	Katraj
24A	Katraj	Lohegaon	Dhankawadi, Balaji Nagar, Padmavati, Mukund Nagar, Natubaug, Swargate, Seven Loves Chowk, Ramoshi Gate, Nana Peth, Rasta Peth, Mangalwar Peth, Sassoon Hospital, Pune Station, Ruby Hall Clinic, Bund Garden, Yerwada, Nagpur Chawl, 509 Chowk, Lohegaon AFS	Katraj, Wagholi
26	Shivaji Nagar	Dhankawadi	COEP Hostel, Deccan Gymkhana, Alka Talkies, Tilak Road, SP College, Hirabaug, Swargate, Mukund Nagar, Padmavati, Balaji Nagar	Na.Ta.Wadi
29	Swargate	Alandi	Seven Loves Chowk, Golibar Maidan, Pulgate, Camp, Westend, GPO, Collector Office, Sassoon Hospital, Pune Station, Ruby Hall Clinic, Bund Garden, Yerwada, Deccan College, Phule Nagar, Vishrantwadi, Kalas, Dighi, Magazine Chowk, Sai Mandir, Wadmukhwadi, Charholi Phata, Dehu Phata	Swargate
30	Marketyard	Ghotawade Phata/Pirangut	Gultekdi, Mukund Nagar, Swargate, Sarasbaug, Shanipar, Appa Balwant Chowk, Shaniwar Wada, PMC, Shivaji Nagar, Pune University Gate, NCL, Pashan, Sai Chowk, Sutarwadi, Sus, Nande Gaon, Lavale, Rautwadi, Lavale Phata, Pirangut	Upper
31	Pune Station	Dhankawadi/Taljai Pathar	Pune Station Depot, GPO, Collector Office, Somwar Peth, Rasta Peth, Nana Peth, Ramoshi Gate, Seven Loves Chowk, Swargate, Parvati, Sarang Society, Parvati Paytha, Padmavati	Katraj
35	PMC	Mukai Chowk/Kiwale	Shivaji Nagar, Pune University, Bremen Chowk, Aundh, Sangvi Phata, Rakshak Chowk, Jagtap Dairy, Kalewadi Phata, Dange Chowk, Tathawade, Punawale Phata, Ravet	Nigdi, Na.Ta.Wadi
36	PMC	Chinchwad	Shivaji Nagar, Pune University, Bremen Chowk, Aundh, Sangvi Phata, Rakshak Chowk, Jagtap Dairy, Kalewadi Phata, Dange Chowk, Datta Nagar, Chaphekar Chowk	Baner
37	Shivaji Nagar	Sahakar Nagar	PMC, Shaniwar Wada, Vasant Talkies, Budhwar Peth, Mandai, Shukrawar Peth, Subhash Nagar, Swargate, Sarasbaug, Nilayam Talkies, Parvati, Laxmi Nagar	Na.Ta.Wadi
38	Shivaji Nagar	Dhankawadi	PMC, Shaniwar Wada, Vasant Talkies, Budhwar Peth, Mandai, Shukrawar Peth, Subhash Nagar, Swargate, Mukund Nagar, Bhapkar Pump, Natubaug, Padmavati, Balaji Nagar	Katraj
39	Pune Station	Dhankawadi	Pune Station Depot, GPO, Collector Office, Somwar Peth, Rasta Peth, Nana Peth, Ramoshi Gate, Seven Loves Chowk, Gultekdi, Marketyard, Padmavati, Balaji Nagar	Katraj
41	Upper Depot	Sangvi	Rajiv Gandhi Nagar, Indira Nagar, Bibwewadi, Vasant Baug, Mukund Nagar, Swargate, Sarasbaug, SP College, Tilak Road, Alka Talkies, Deccan Gymkhana, Bhandarkar Road, SB Road, Symbiosis College, Gokhale Nagar, University Gate, NCL, Sakal Nagar, Sanewadi, Parihar Chowk, Aundh, Sangvi Phata, Juni Sangvi	Upper
42	Katraj	Nigdi	Dhankawadi, Balaji Nagar, Padmavati, Mukund Nagar, Swargate, Sarasbaug, Dandekar Pul, Lokmanya Nagar, Sadashiv Peth, Alka Talkies, Deccan Gymkhana, Shivaji Nagar, Wakdewadi, Khadki, Bopodi, Dapodi, Phugewadi, Kasarwadi, Nashik Phata, Vallabh Nagar, Pimpri, PCMC, Chinchwad, Ganga Nagar Corner, Akurdi, Bhakti Shakti	Katraj, Nigdi
43	Katraj	Nigdi	Ambegaon, Navale Bridge, Vadgaon, Warje, Chandni Chowk, Bavdhan, Pashan, Radha Chowk, Balewadi, Bhumkar Chowk, Wakad, Dange Chowk, Datta Nagar, Chinchwad, Chinchwad Station, Ganga Nagar Corner, Akurdi, Bhakti Shakti	Nigdi, Katraj
43A	Katraj	Hinjewadi Phase 3	Ambegaon, Navale Bridge, Vadgaon, Warje, Chandni Chowk, Bavdhan, Pashan, Radha Chowk, Balewadi, Wakad Bridge, Hinjewadi Phase 1, Wipro Phase 2, Infosys, Tech Mahindra, Megapolis Society	Baner, Katraj
44	Katraj	Akurdi Railway Station	Ambegaon, Navale Bridge, Vadgaon, Warje, Chandni Chowk, Bavdhan, Pashan, Radha Chowk, Balewadi, Bhumkar Chowk, Wakad, Dange Chowk, Datta Nagar, Chinchwad, Chinchwade Farm, Bijli Nagar, Pradhikaran	Baner
45	Katraj	Radha Chowk/Balewadi Stadium	Ambegaon, Navale Pul, Vadgaon, Warje, Chandni Chowk, Bavdhan, Pashan	Baner
47	Swargate	Sanaswadi Gaon	Sarasbaug, Dandekar Pul, Dattawadi, Vitthalwadi, Anand Nagar, Vadgaon Phata, Vadgaon Khurd, Kirkatwadi, Wanjalewadi, Nandoshi	Swargate
50	Swargate	Sinhagad Paytha	Sarasbaug, Dandekar Pul, Dattawadi, Vitthalwadi, Anand Nagar, Vadgaon Phata, Vadgaon Kd, Kirkatwadi, Nanded City, Mukai Nagar, Khadakwasla, Gorhe Gaon, Donje Gaon, Askarwadi	Swargate
51	Shivaji Nagar	Dhayari/Maruti Mandir	Deccan Gymkhana, Alka Talkies, Sadashiv Peth, Lokmanya Nagar, Navi Peth, Panmala, Dattawadi, Vitthalwadi, Anand Nagar, Vadgaon Phata, Vadgaon Kd, Khadewadi	Na.Ta.Wadi
52	Swargate	Khanapur	Sarasbaug, Dandekar Pul, Dattawadi, Vitthalwadi, Anand Nagar, Vadgaon Phata, Vadgaon Kd, Kirkatwadi, Nanded City, Mukai Nagar, Khadakwasla, Gorhe Kd	Swargate
52A	Swargate	Panshet/Varasgaon	Sarasbaug, Dandekar Pul, Dattawadi, Vitthalwadi, Anand Nagar, Vadgaon Phata, Vadgaon Kd, Kirkatwadi, Nanded City, Mukai Nagar, Khadakwasla, Gorhe Kd, Khanapur, Malkhed, Sonapur, Kuran Kd	Swargate
55	Swargate	Suncity Society/Anand Nagar	Sarasbaug, Dandekar Pul, Dattawadi, Vitthalwadi, Anand Nagar, Nimbaj Nagar	Swargate
56	Mandai	Vadgaon Budruk	Shanipar, Vishrambaug Wada, Laxmi Road, Narayan Peth, Alka Talkies, Ganjavewadi, Lokmanya Nagar, Navi Peth, Mhatre Pul, Panmala, Dattawadi, Vitthalwadi, Hingne Kd, Anand Nagar	Swargate
57	Pune Station	Vadgaon Budruk	Pune Station Depot, GPO, Collector Office, Somwar Peth, Ganesh Peth, Budhwar Peth, City Post, Tulshi Baug/Laxmi Road, Narayan Peth, Alka Talkies, Sadashiv Peth, Lokmanya Nagar, Navi Peth, Panmala, Dattawadi, Vitthalwadi, Anand Nagar	Swargate
58	Shanipar	Gokhale Nagar	Vishrambaug Wada, Laxmi Road, Narayan Peth, Alka Talkies, Deccan Gymkhana, Bhandarkar Road, SB Road, Symbiosis College, Vetal Baba Chowk, Kusalkar Putala	Swargate
59	Shanipar	Niljyoti Society	Vishrambaug Wada, Laxmi Road, Narayan Peth, Alka Talkies, Deccan Gymkhana, Bhandarkar Road, SB Road, Symbiosis College, Vetal Baba Chowk, Kusalkar Putala, Chatushrungi Hill	Swargate
61	Katraj	Sarola	Mangdewadi, Katraj Ghat, Shindewadi, Velu, Khed Shivapur, Shivare, Varve Bk, Nasrapur Phata, Kapurhol, Kikvi	Katraj
64	Bhekrainagar	NDA Gate	Tukai Darshan, Satavwadi, Hadapsar, Ramtekdi, Bhairoba Nala, Fatima Nagar, Pulgate, Golibar Maidan, Seven Loves Chowk, Swargate, Sarasbaug, SP College, Tilak Road, Alka Talkies, Deccan Corner, Garware College, Erandwane, Nalstop, Karve Road, Kothrud Stand, Karve Nagar, Hingne Bk, Galinde Path/Warje Naka, Tapodham, Warje, Malwadi, Ganpati Matha, Shivane, Kondhwa Dhavade	Bhekrainagar
65	Hadapsar Gadital	Yavat	Manjari Phata, Shewalewadi, Loni Kalbhor, Kunjirwadi, Uruli Kanchan, Mhetre Vasti	Hadapsar
65A	Hadapsar Gadital	Varvand	Manjari Phata, Shewalewadi, Loni Kalbhor, Kunjirwadi, Uruli Kanchan, Mhetre Vasti, Yavat, Bhandgaon, Wakhari, Kedagaon	Hadapsar
66	Marketyard	Aglambe Gaon	Gultekdi, Mukund Nagar, Swargate, Sarasbaug, SP College, Tilak Road, Alka Talkies, Deccan Corner, Garware College, Erandwane, Nalstop, Karve Road, Kothrud Stand, Karve Nagar, Hingne Bk, Galinde Path/Warje Naka, Tapodham, Warje, Malwadi, Ganpati Matha, Shivane, Kondhwa Dhavade, NDA Gate, Khadakwasla, Kudje Gaon	Upper
67	Hadapsar Gadital	Uruli Kanchan	Manjari Phata, Shewalewadi, Loni Kalbhor, Kunjirwadi	Hadapsar
68	Upper Depot	Sutardara	Rajiv Gandhi Nagar, Indira Nagar, Bibwewadi, Vasant Baug, Mukund Nagar, Swargate, Sarasbaug, Shanipar, Laxmi Road, Narayan Peth, Alka Talkies, Deccan Corner, Garware College, Erandwane, Nalstop, Ideal Colony, Anand Nagar, Kothrud	Upper
69	Marketyard	Ghotawade Gaon	Gultekdi, Mukund Nagar, Swargate, Sarasbaug, Dandekar Pul, Lokmanya Nagar, Sadashiv Peth, Alka Talkies, Deccan Corner, Garware College, Erandwane, Nalstop, Ideal Colony, Anand Nagar, Vanaz, Kothrud, Paud Road, Chandni Chowk, Bhugaon, Bhukum, Lavale Phata, Pirangut	Upper
70	Marketyard	Mulshi	Gultekdi, Mukund Nagar, Swargate, Sarasbaug, Dandekar Pul, Lokmanya Nagar, Sadashiv Peth, Alka Talkies, Deccan Corner, Garware College, Erandwane, Nalstop, Ideal Colony, Anand Nagar, Vanaz, Kothrud, Paud Road, Chandni Chowk, Bhugaon, Bhukum, Lavale Phata, Pirangut, Kasar Amboli, Ambadvet, Darawali, Paud, Kalamshet, Shileshwar, Jamgaon, Disli	Upper
71/VARTUL	Kothrud	Sukhsagar Nagar(And back to Kothrud)	Vanaz, Anand Nagar, Ideal Colony, Nalstop, Erandwane, Garware College, Deccan Corner, Alka Talkies, Tilak Road, Hirabaug, Swargate, Mukund Nagar, Vasant Baug, Bibwewadi, Indira Nagar, Upper Depot, Rajiv Gandhi Nagar, Sukhsagar Nagar, Rajiv Gandhi Nagar, Indira Nagar, Bibwewadi, Vasant Baug, Mukund Nagar, Swargate, Sarasbaug, Tilak Road, Alka Talkies, Deccan Corner, Garware College, Erandwane, Nalstop, Ideal Colony, Anand Nagar, Vanaz	Kothrud
72	Upper Depot	NDA Gate	Rajiv Gandhi Nagar, Indira Nagar, Bibwewadi, Vasant Baug, Mukund Nagar, Swargate, Sarasbaug, SP College, Tilak Road, Alka Talkies, Deccan Corner, Garware College, Erandwane, Nalstop, Karve Road, Kothrud Stand, Karve Nagar, Hingne Bk, Galinde Path/Warje Naka, Tapodham, Warje, Malwadi, Ganpati Matha, Shivane, Kondhwa Dhavade	Upper
73	Hadapsar	Khamgaon	Manjari Phata, Shewalewadi, Loni Kalbhor, Kunjirwadi, Uruli Kanchan, Mhetre Vasti, Sahajpur, Nandur	Hadapsar
74	Chinchwad	Paud Gaon	Chaphekar Chowk, Datta Nagar, Dange Chowk, Wakad, Bhumkar Chowk, Hinjewadi Phase 1, Wipro Phase 2, Infosys, Tech Mahindra, Megapolis Society, Hinjewadi Phase 3, Godambewadi, Shelkewadi, Bhare Phata, Ghotawade Phata, Pirangut, Kasar Amboli, Balkawade Vasti, Darawali	Balewadi
76	PMC	Galinde Path/Warje Naka	FC Road, Deccan Gymkhana, Garware College, Erandwane, Nalstop, Karve Road, Kothrud Stand, Karve Nagar, Hingne Bk	Kothrud
77	Hinjewadi Phase 3	Galinde Path/Warje Naka	Megapolis Society, Tech Mahindra, Infosys, Wipro Phase 2, Hinjewadi Phase 1, Bhujbal Vasti, Wakad Phata, Balewadi, Baner/Radha Chowk, Pashan, Sutarwadi, Bavdhan, Chandni Chowk, Paud Phata, Kothrud, Vanaz, Anand Nagar, Ideal Colony, Nalstop, Karve Road, Kothrud Stand, Karve Nagar, Hingne Bk	Baner
78	Marketyard	NDA Gate	Gultekdi, Mukund Nagar, Swargate, Sarasbaug, SP College, Tilak Road, Alka Talkies, Deccan Corner, Garware College, Erandwane, Nalstop, Karve Road, Kothrud Stand, Karve Nagar, Hingne Bk, Galinde Path/Warje Naka, Tapodham, Warje, Malwadi, Ganpati Matha, Shivane, Kondhwa Dhavade	Upper
80	PMC	Aditya Garden City/Warje	Deccan Gymkhana, Garware College, Erandwane, Nalstop, Karve Road, Kothrud Stand, Karve Nagar, Hingne Bk, Galinde Path/Warje Naka, Tapodham, Warje, Rahul Park	Kothrud
81	Pune Station	Kumbare Park	Pune Station Depot, GPO, Collector Office, Somwar Peth, Ganesh Peth, Raviwar Peth, City Post, Laxmi Road, Alka Talkies, Deccan Corner, Garware College, Erandwane, Nalstop, Ideal Colony, Anand Nagar, Vanaz, Kothrud	Kothrud
82/VARTUL	PMC	NDA Gate(And back to PMC)	Deccan Gymkhana, Garware College, Erandwane, Nalstop, Karve Road, Kothrud Stand, Karve Nagar, Hingne Bk, Galinde Path/Warje Naka, Tapodham, Warje, Malwadi, Ganpati Matha, Shivane, Kondhwa Dhavade, NDA Gate, Kondhwa Dhavade, Shivane, Ganpati Matha, Malwadi, Warje, Tapodham, Galinde Path/Warje Naka, Hingne Bk, Karve Nagar, Kothrud Stand, Karve Road, Nalstop, Erandwane, Garware College, Deccan Gymkhana, Goodluck Chowk, FC Road, Shivaji Nagar	Kothrud
83	NDA Gate	Alandi	Kondhwa Dhavade, Shivane, Ganpati Matha, Malwadi, Warje, Tapodham, Galinde Path/Warje Naka, Hingne Bk, Karve Nagar, Kothrud Stand, Karve Road, Nalstop, Erandwane, Garware College, Deccan Gymkhana, Goodluck Chowk, FC Road, Shivaji Nagar, Wakdewadi, Mula Road, Bombay Sappers, Deccan College, Phule Nagar, Vishrantwadi, Kalas, Dighi, Magazine Chowk, Sai Mandir, Wadmukhwadi, Charholi Phata, Dehu Phata	Kothrud
84	Deccan Gymkhana	Sangrun	Garware College, Erandwane, Nalstop, Karve Road, Kothrud Stand, Karve Nagar, Hingne Bk, Galinde Path/Warje Naka, Tapodham, Warje, Malwadi, Ganpati Matha, Shivane, Kondhwa Dhavade, NDA Gate, Khadakwasla, Kudje Gaon, Khadakwadi, Mandvi Bk	Kothrud
84A	Deccan Gymkhana	Kondhur Gaon	Garware College, Erandwane, Nalstop, Karve Road, Kothrud Stand, Karve Nagar, Hingne Bk, Galinde Path/Warje Naka, Tapodham, Warje, Malwadi, Ganpati Matha, Shivane, Kondhwa Dhavade, NDA Gate, Khadakwasla, Kudje Gaon, Khadakwadi, Mandvi Bk, Sangrun, Katawadi, Gaikwadwadi, Bahuli	Kothrud
85	PMC	Mokarwadi/Ahire Gaon	Deccan Gymkhana, Garware College, Erandwane, Nalstop, Karve Road, Kothrud Stand, Karve Nagar, Hingne Bk, Galinde Path/Warje Naka, Tapodham, Warje, Malwadi, Ganpati Matha, Shivane, Kondhwa Dhavade, NDA Gate	Kothrud
86	Pune Station	Paud Gaon/ST Stand	Pune Station Depot, GPO, Collector Office, Juna Bazaar, Dengale Pul, PMC, Deccan Gymkhana, Garware College, Erandwane, Nalstop, Ideal Colony, Anand Nagar, Vanaz, Kothrud, Chandni Chowk, Bhugaon, Bhukum, Lavale Phata, Pirangut, Ghotawade Phata, Bhare Phata, Ambadvet, Aamlewadi, Darawali	Pune Station, Kothrud
87	Deccan Gymkhana	Sutarwadi	FC Road, Goodluck Chowk, Modern College, PMC, Shivaji Nagar, Pune University Gate, NCL, Bhagvati Nagar, Pashan, Sai Chowk	Balewadi
87A	Deccan Gymkhana	Symbiosis College/Lavale	FC Road, Goodluck Chowk, Modern College, PMC, Shivaji Nagar, Pune University Gate, NCL, Bhagvati Nagar, Pashan, Sai Chowk, Sutarwadi, Sus Gaon	Balewadi
89	Swargate	Niljyoti Society	Sarasbaug, Tilak Road, SP College, Alka Talkies, Deccan Gymkhana, FC Road, Goodluck Chowk, Model Colony, Wadarwadi, Kusalkar Putala, Gokhale Nagar	Na.Ta.Wadi
90	Katraj	Gokhale Nagar	Dhankawadi, Balaji Nagar, Padmavati, Mukund Nagar, Swargate, Sarasbaug, Tilak Road, SP College, Alka Talkies, Deccan Gymkhana, FC Road, Goodluck Chowk, Model Colony, Wadarwadi, Kusalkar Putala	Katraj
91	PMC	Ishan Nagari/Warje	Deccan Gymkhana, Garware College, Erandwane, Nalstop, Karve Road, Kothrud Stand, Karve Nagar, Hingne Bk, Galinde Path/Warje Naka	Kothrud
92	Kothrud Depot	Venutai Chavan College/Vadgaon	Shastri Nagar, Azad Nagar, Karve Road, Paud Phata, Nalstop, Erandwane, Garware College, Deccan Corner, Alka Talkies, Ganjavewadi, Lokmanya Nagar, Navi Peth, Mhatre Pul, Panmala, Dattawadi, Vitthalwadi, Hingne Kd, Anand Nagar, Vadgaon Bk	Kothrud
93	Deccan Gymkhana	Pimple Nilakh	FC Road, Fergusson College, Shivaji Nagar, Pune University, Bremen Chowk, Aundh, Sangvi Phata, Rakshak Chowk	Balewadi
94	Pune Station	Kothrud Depot	Pune Station Depot, GPO, Collector Office, Somwar Peth, Raviwar Peth, Phadke Haud, Vasant Talkies, Appa Balwant Chowk, Narayan Peth, Pulachi Wadi, Alka Talkies, Deccan Corner, Garware College, Erandwane, Nalstop, Ideal Colony, Anand Nagar, Vanaz	Kothrud
95	Deccan Gymkhana	PVPIT College/Bavdhan	Garware College, Erandwane, Nalstop, Ideal Colony, Anand Nagar, Vanaz, Kothrud, Chandni Chowk, Kokate Vasti	Kothrud
97	Warje Malwadi	Sahakar Nagar	Tapodham, Galinde Path/Warje Naka, Hingne Bk, Karve Nagar, Kothrud Stand, Karve Road, Nalstop, Erandwane, Garware College, Deccan Corner, Alka Talkies, SP College, Tilak Road, Nilayam Talkies, Parvati Paytha, Laxmi Nagar	Kothrud
98	Warje Malwadi	Wagholi	Tapodham, Galinde Path/Warje Naka, Hingne Bk, Karve Nagar, Kothrud Stand, Karve Road, Nalstop, Erandwane, Garware College, Deccan Gymkhana, FC Road, Goodluck Chowk, Modern College, PMC, Dengale Pul, Juna Bazaar, Sassoon Hospital, Pune Station, Ruby Hall Clinic, Bund Garden, Yerwada, Shastri Nagar, Ramwadi, Viman Nagar, Chandan Nagar, Kharadi Bypass, Aaple Ghar, Khandve Nagar, Kesnand Phata	Kothrud, Wagholi
99	Kothrud Depot	Vishrantwadi	Vanaz, Anand Nagar, Ideal Colony, Nalstop, Erandwane, Garware College, Deccan Gymkhana, FC Road, Goodluck Chowk, Modern College, PMC, Shivaji Nagar, Sangamwadi, Deccan College, Phule Nagar	Kothrud
100	PMC	Hinjewadi Phase 3	Shivaji Nagar, Pune University, Bremen Chowk, Aundh, Sangvi Phata, Rakshak Chowk, Vishal Nagar, Kaspate Vasti, Wakad, Bhujbal Vasti, Hinjewadi Phase 1, Wipro Phase 2, Infosys, Tech Mahindra, Megapolis Society	Na.Ta.Wadi, Baner
100A	PMC	Blue Ridge Society/Hinjewadi Phase 1	Shivaji Nagar, Pune University, Bremen Chowk, Aundh, Sangvi Phata, Rakshak Chowk, Vishal Nagar, Kaspate Vasti, Wakad, Bhujbal Vasti, Hinjewadi Phase 1, Symbiosis Hostel	Na.Ta.Wadi
103	Katraj	Kothrud Depot	Dhankawadi, Balaji Nagar, Padmavati, Mukund Nagar, Swargate, Sarasbaug, Tilak Road, SP College, Alka Talkies, Deccan Corner, Garware College, Erandwane, Nalstop, Ideal Colony, Anand Nagar, Vanaz	Kothrud, Katraj
104	Shivaji Nagar/Na.Ta.Wadi	Dhayari/DSK Vishwa	COEP Hostel, Deccan Gymkhana, Garware College, Erandwane, Nalstop, Karve Road, Kothrud Stand, Karve Nagar, Hingne Bk, Karve Nagar, Rajaram Pul, Vitthalwadi, Anand Nagar, Vadgaon Phata, Bhide Baug, Vadgaon Kd, Khadewadi, Dhayari	Na.Ta.Wadi
107	Warje Malwadi	Pimple Gurav	Tapodham, Galinde Path/Warje Naka, Hingne Bk, Karve Nagar, Kothrud Stand, Karve Road, Nalstop, Erandwane, Garware College, Deccan Gymkhana, FC Road, Goodluck Chowk, Modern College, PMC, Shivaji Nagar, Bhosale Nagar, Range Hills, Kendriya Vidyalaya/Khadki, Khadki, Anand Nagar, Bopodi, Dapodi, Gangotri Nagar	Kothrud
108	Pune Station	Sutardara	Pune Station Depot, GPO, Collector Office, Somwar Peth, Phadke Haud, Raviwar Peth, Vasant Talkies, Appa Balwant Chowk, Narayan Peth, Pulachi Wadi, Alka Talkies, Deccan Corner, Garware College, Erandwane, Nalstop, Ideal Colony, Anand Nagar, Vanaz, Kothrud, SBI Colony	Kothrud
109/VARTUL	PMC(Round Trip)	PMC(Round Trip)	Shivaji Nagar, Pune University Gate, NCL, Pashan, Bavdhan, Chandni Chowk, Kothrud, Vanaz, Anand Nagar, Ideal Colony, Nalstop, Erandwane, Garware College, Deccan Gymkhana, FC Road, Goodluck Chowk, Modern College	Kothrud
110/VARTUL	PMC(Round Trip)	PMC(Round Trip)	Deccan Gymkhana, Garware College, Erandwane, Nalstop, Ideal Colony, Anand Nagar, Vanaz, Kothrud, Chandni Chowk, Bavdhan, Pashan, NCL, Sakal Nagar, Pune University Gate, Shivaji Nagar	Kothrud
111/VARTUL	Bhekrainagar(Round Trip)	PMC(Round Trip)	Tukai Darshan, Satavwadi, Hadapsar, Ramtekdi, Bhairoba Nala, Fatima Nagar, Racecourse, Pulgate, Golibar Maidan, Shankar Sheth Road, Seven Loves Chowk, Swargate, Sarasbaug, Tilak Road, SP College, Alka Talkies, Deccan Gymkhana, FC Road, Goodluck Chowk, Modern College, PMC, Dengale Pul, Juna Bazaar, Collector Office, GPO, Westend, Camp, Pulgate, Racecourse, Fatima Nagar, Bhairoba Nala, Ramtekdi, Hadapsar, Satavwadi, Tukai Darshan	Bhekrainagar
113	Shaniwar Wada	Sangvi	PMC, Shivaji Nagar, Pune University, Bremen Chowk, Aundh, Sangvi Phata, Juni Sangvi	Na.Ta.Wadi
114	PMC	Mahalunge/Stadium	Shivaji Nagar, Pune University Gate, Sakal Nagar, Baner Road, Baner, Radha Chowk	Baner
115	Pune Station	Hinjewadi Phase 3	Pune Station Depot, GPO, Collector Office, Juna Bazaar, Dengale Pul, PMC, Shivaji Nagar, Pune University, Bremen Chowk, Aundh, Sangvi Phata, Rakshak Chowk, Jagtap Dairy, Kalewadi Phata, Dange Chowk, Wakad, Bhumkar Chowk, Hinjewadi Phase 1, Wipro Phase 2, Tech Mahindra, Megapolis Society	Pune Station
117	Swargate	Dhayari/Jadhav Nagar	Sarasbaug, Dandekar Pul, Dattawadi, Vitthalwadi, Hingne Kd, Anand Nagar, Vadgaon Phata, Dhayari Phata, Khadewadi, Chavan Nagar, Baragani Mala Mandir	Swargate
118	Swargate	Venutai Chavan College/Vadgaon Bk	Sarasbaug, Dandekar Pul, Dattawadi, Vitthalwadi, Anand Nagar, Vadgaon Bk	Swargate
119	PMC	Alandi	Shivaji Nagar, Wakdewadi, Mula Road, Bombay Sappers, Deccan College, Phule Nagar, Vishrantwadi, Kalas, Dighi, Magazine Chowk, Sai Mandir, Wadmukhwadi, Charholi Phata, Dehu Phata	Na.Ta.Wadi
120	Bhosari	Mahalunge MIDC/Endurance	Bhosari Depot, Sadguru Nagar, Gandharv Nagari, Borhadewadi, Moshi, Chimbali Phata, Kurali, Alandi Phata, Chakan, Talegaon Chowk, Kharabwadi, Mahalunge Ingale	Bhosari
121	PMC	Bhosari	Shivaji Nagar, Wakdewadi, Khadki, Bopodi, Dapodi, Phugewadi, Kasarwadi, Nashik Phata, Bhosari MIDC, Landewadi, Gavhane Vasti	Bhosari
122	PMC	Chinchwad	Shivaji Nagar, Wakdewadi, Khadki, Bopodi, Dapodi, Phugewadi, Kasarwadi, Nashik Phata, Vallabh Nagar, Pimpri, Pimpri Station, Bhat Nagar, Keshav Nagar	Pimpri
123	PMC	Nigdi	Shivaji Nagar, Wakdewadi, Khadki, Bopodi, Dapodi, Phugewadi, Kasarwadi, Nashik Phata, Vallabh Nagar, Pimpri, PCMC, Chinchwad, Ganga Nagar Corner, Akurdi, Bhakti Shakti	Nigdi, Na.Ta.Wadi
125	Khadki	Bopkhel	Ordnance Factory, Vishrantwadi, Kalas, Ganesh Nagar	Na.Ta.Wadi
126	Pimple Nilakh	Vishrantwadi	Rakshak Chowk, Sangvi Phata, Aundh, Bremen Chowk, Spicer College, Bopodi, Khadki Bazaar, Ordnance Factory	Balewadi
130	Swargate	Narhegaon	Mukund Nagar, Padmavati, Balaji Nagar, Dhankawadi, Katraj, Datta Nagar, Dalvi Nagar, Ambegaon Bk	Swargate
131	PMC	Golegaon	Dengle Pul, Juna Bazaar, Sassoon Hospital, Pune Station, Ruby Hall Clinic, Bund Garden, Yerwada, Nagpur Chawl, 509 Chowk, Air Force Station, Lohegaon, Moje Chawl, Jadhavwasti, Vadgaon Shinde, Pimpalgaon	Na.Ta.Wadi
132	PMC	Shubham Society	Dengle Pul, Juna Bazaar, Sassoon Hospital, Pune Station, Ruby Hall Clinic, Bund Garden, Yerwada, Shastri Nagar, Ramwadi, Viman Nagar, Somnath Nagar	Na.Ta.Wadi
133	PMC	Anand Park	Dengle Pul, Juna Bazaar, Sassoon Hospital, Pune Station, Ruby Hall Clinic, Bund Garden, Yerwada, Shastri Nagar, Ramwadi, Viman Nagar, Sunita Nagar, Ganesh Nagar	Na.Ta.Wadi
133A	PMC	Columbia Hospital, Kharadi	Dengle Pul, Juna Bazaar, Sassoon Hospital, Pune Station, Ruby Hall Clinic, Bund Garden, Yerwada, Shastri Nagar, Ramwadi, Viman Nagar, Sunita Nagar, Anand Park, Sainath Nagar	Na.Ta.Wadi
135	PMC	Ranjangaon Sandas	Dengle Pul, Juna Bazaar, Sassoon Hospital, Pune Station, Ruby Hall Clinic, Bund Garden, Yerwada, Shastri Nagar, Ramwadi, Viman Nagar, Chandan Nagar, Kharadi Bypass, Aaple Ghar, Khandve Nagar, Wagholi, Kesnand Phata, Kesnand, Wadebolai, Ashtapur, Shindewadi, Pilanwadi, Rahu, Telewadi, Walki	Na.Ta.Wadi
136	Wagholi	Wadegaon	Kesnand, Pathare Wasti	Wagholi
137	PMC	Pargaon Salumalu	Dengle Pul, Juna Bazaar, Sassoon Hospital, Pune Station, Ruby Hall Clinic, Bund Garden, Yerwada, Shastri Nagar, Ramwadi, Viman Nagar, Chandan Nagar, Kharadi Bypass, Aaple Ghar, Khandve Nagar, Wagholi, Kesnand Phata, Kesnand, Wadebolai, Ashtapur, Shindewadi, Pilanwadi, Rahu, Pimpalgaon, Delawadi	Na.Ta.Wadi
139	Shewalewadi	Nigdi	Manjari Phata, Hadapsar, Ramtekdi, Fatima Nagar, Racecourse, Pulgate, Camp, Westend, GPO, Collector Office, Juna Bazaar, Mangalwar Gadital, Shivaji Nagar, Wakdewadi, Khadki, Bopodi, Dapodi, Phugewadi, Kasarwadi, Nashik Phata, Vallabh Nagar, Pimpri, PCMC, Chinchwad, Ganga Nagar Corner, Akurdi, Bhakti Shakti	Nigdi
139A	Bhekrainagar	Nigdi	Tukai Darshan, Satavwadi, Hadapsar, Ramtekdi, Fatima Nagar, Racecourse, Pulgate, Camp, Westend, GPO, Collector Office, Juna Bazaar, Mangalwar Gadital, Shivaji Nagar, Wakdewadi, Khadki, Bopodi, Dapodi, Phugewadi, Kasarwadi, Nashik Phata, Vallabh Nagar, Pimpri, PCMC, Chinchwad, Ganga Nagar Corner, Akurdi, Bhakti Shakti	Bhekrainagar, Nigdi
140	Pune Station	Upper Depot	Pune Station Depot, GPO, Collector Office, Rasta Peth, Nana Peth, Ramoshi Gate, 7 Loves Chowk, Gultekdi, Marketyard, Hyde Park, Vasantbaug, Bibwewadi, Indira Nagar, Rajiv Gandhi Nagar	Upper
140A	Pune Station	Katraj	Pune Station Depot, GPO, Collector Office, Somwar Peth, Rasta Peth, Nana Peth, Ramoshi Gate, 7 Loves Chowk, Gultekdi, Marketyard, Hyde Park, Gangadham, Kakade Vasti, Salve Garden, Kondhwa Bk	Katraj
141	Pune Station	Kumar Prithvi Society, Kondhwa	Pune Station Depot, GPO, Collector Office, Rasta Peth, Nana Peth, Ramoshi Gate, 7 Loves Chowk, Gultekdi, Marketyard, Hyde Park, Gangadham, Kakade Vasti	Upper
142	Pune Station	Ghotawade Phata	GPO, Collector Office, Juna Bazaar, Dengle Pul, PMC, Shivaji Nagar, Pune University Gate, NCL, Pashan, Sai Chowk, Sutarwadi, Sus Gaon, Nande, Chande, Mulkhed, Bhare Phata, Pirangut	Pune Station
143	Pune Station	Galinde Path/Warje Naka	Pune Station Depot, GPO, Collector Office, Somwar Peth, Phadke Haud, Raviwar Peth, Vasant Talkies, Appa Balwant Chowk, Narayan Peth, Pulachi Wadi, Alka Talkies, Ganjavewadi, Sadashiv Peth, Lokmanya Nagar, Mhatre Bridge, Erandwane Gaothan, Vakil Nagar, Mile Square, Ganesh Nagar, Karve Nagar, Hingne Bk	Kothrud
144	Pune Station	NDA Gate	Pune Station Depot, GPO, Collector Office, Somwar Peth, Apollo Talkies, Ganesh Peth, Raviwar Peth, Budhwar Peth, City Post, Laxmi Road, Sadashiv Peth, Alka Talkies, Deccan Corner, Garware College, Erandwane, Nalstop, Karve Road, Kothrud Stand, Karve Nagar, Hingne Bk, Galinde Path/Warje Naka, Tapodham, Warje, Malwadi, Ganpati Matha, Shivane, Kondhwa Dhavade	Kothrud
144A	Pune Station	Aditya Garden City/Warje	Pune Station Depot, GPO, Collector Office, Somwar Peth, Apollo Talkies, Ganesh Peth, Raviwar Peth, Budhwar Peth, City Post, Laxmi Road, Sadashiv Peth, Alka Talkies, Deccan Corner, Garware College, Erandwane, Nalstop, Karve Road, Kothrud Stand, Karve Nagar, Hingne Bk, Galinde Path/Warje Naka, Tapodham, Warje Highway, Cipla Centre	Kothrud
144K	Pune Station	Gujarat Colony	Pune Station Depot, GPO, Collector Office, Somwar Peth, Apollo Talkies, Ganesh Peth, Raviwar Peth, Budhwar Peth, City Post, Laxmi Road, Sadashiv Peth, Alka Talkies, Deccan Corner, Garware College, Erandwane, Nalstop, Karve Road, Mayur Colony	Kothrud
145	Pune Station	Sutarwadi	Pune Station Depot, GPO, Collector Office, Juna Bazaar, Dengale Pul, PMC, Shivaji Nagar, Pune University, Pashan Road, NCL, Bhagvati Nagar, Pashan, Sai Chowk	Pune Station
146	Pune Station	Gokhale Nagar	GPO, Collector Office, Juna Bazaar, Dengale Pul, PMC, Ghole Road, Paduka Chowk, Model Colony, Kusalkar Putala, Patrakar Nagar	Pune Station
148	Shewalewadi	Pimple Gurav	Manjari Phata, Solapur Road, Hadapsar Gadital, Ramtekdi, Bhairoba Nala, Fatima Nagar, Racecourse, Pulgate, Camp, MG Road, Westend, GPO, Collector Office, Sassoon Hospital, Pune Station, Ruby Hall Clinic, Bund Garden, Yerwada, Deccan College, Bombay Sappers, Khadki Cantonment, Khadki Bazaar, Bopodi, Dapodi	Shewalewadi
148A	Bhekrainagar	Bhosari	Tukai Darshan, Satavwadi, Hadapsar Gadital, Ramtekdi, Bhairoba Nala, Fatima Nagar, Racecourse, Pulgate, Camp, MG Road, Westend, GPO, Collector Office, Sassoon Hospital, Pune Station, Ruby Hall Clinic, Bund Garden, Yerwada, Deccan College, Bombay Sappers, Khadki Cantonment, Khadki Bazaar, Bopodi, Dapodi, Pimple Gurav, Prabhat Nagar, Kashid Park, Kasarwadi, Nashik Phata, Bhosari MIDC, Landewadi, Gavhane Vasti	Bhosari, Hadapsar
149	Hadapsar Gadital	Nigdi	Hadapsar, Magarpatta, Mundhwa, Columbia Hospital, Kharadi, Yashwant Nagar, Kharadi Bypass, Chandan Nagar, Viman Nagar, Ramwadi, Nagar Road, Shastri Nagar, Yerwada, Nagpur Chawl, 509 Chowk, Tingre Nagar, Vishrantwadi, Kalas, Dighi, Magazine Chowk, Gajanan Nagar, Ramnagar, Bhosari, Gavhane Vasti, Landewadi, Telco Road, Indrayani Nagar, Tata Motors, KSB Chowk, Bird Valley, Thermax Chowk, Yamuna Nagar, Nigdi Bypass, Bhakti Shakti	Hadapsar
151	Pune Station	Alandi	Ruby Hall Clinic, Bund Garden, Yerwada, Gunjan Talkies, Nagpur Chawl, 509 Chowk, Tingre Nagar, Vishrantwadi, Kalas, Dighi, Magazine Chowk, Sai Mandir, Wadmukhwadi, Charholi Phata, Dehu Phata	Pune Station
152	PMC	Lohegaon	Shivaji Nagar, Wakdewadi, Mula Road, Bombay Sappers, Phule Nagar, Vishrantwadi, Bhairav Nagar, Dhanori	Wagholi
153	Kharadi	Alandi	Yashwant Nagar, Kharadi Bypass, Chandan Nagar, Vaman Nagar, Ramwadi, Nagar Road, Shastri Nagar, Yerwada, Nagpur Chawl, 509 Chowk, Tingre Nagar, Vishrantwadi, Kalas, Dighi, Magazine Chowk, Sai Mandir, Wadmukhwadi, Charholi Phata, Dehu Phata	Bhosari
154/155	Pune Station	Wagholi Depot	Ruby Hall Clinic, Bund Garden, Yerwada, Gunjan Talkies, Ambedkar Society, Phule Nagar, Vishrantwadi, Bhairav Nagar, Dhanori, Lohegaon, Diamond Waterpark	Wagholi
156	Hadapsar Gadital	Kharadi Bypass	Hadapsar Gaon, Magarpatta, Kirtane Baug, Mundhwa, Columbia Hospital, Kharadi, Yashwant Nagar	Wagholi
157	PMC	JSPM College/Wagholi	COEP Hostel, Shivaji Nagar, Sangamwadi, Yerwada, Shastri Nagar, Nagar Road, Ramwadi, Viman Nagar, Chandan Nagar, Kharadi Bypass, Aaple Ghar, Khandve Nagar, Kesnand Phata, Wagholi	Na.Ta.Wadi
158	PMC	Lohegaon	Dengale Pul, Juna Bazaar, Sassoon Hospital, Pune Station, Ruby Hall Clinic, Bund Garden, Yerwada, Gunjan Talkies, Nagpur Chawl, 509 Chowk, Airport Corner, Lohegaon Air Force Station	Wagholi
159	PMC	Talegaon Dhamdhere	Dengale Pul, Juna Bazaar, Sassoon Hospital, Pune Station, Ruby Hall Clinic, Bund Garden, Yerwada, Shastri Nagar, Nagar Road, Ramwadi, Viman Nagar, Chandan Nagar, Kharadi Bypass, Aaple Ghar, Khandve Nagar, Wagholi, Kesnand Phata, Vitthalwadi, Lonikand, Koregaon Bhima, Sanaswadi, Shikrapur	Na.Ta.Wadi
160	Shaniwar Wada	Manjari Bk	Kasba Peth, Kumbharwada, Juna Bazaar, GPO, Pune Station Depot, Ruby Hall Clinic, Wadia College, Koregaon Park, Mundhwa, Keshav Nagar, Lonkar Nagar, Ghule Vasti	Swargate
161	Wagholi	Shirur	Vitthalwadi, Lonikand, Koregaon Bhima, Sanaswadi, Shikrapur, Pabal Phata, Kasari, Kondhapuri, Ranjangaon, Ranjangaon MIDC, Karegaon, Saradwadi, Tardobachiwadi, Takali Haji	Wagholi
162	PMC	Kendur	Dengale Pul, Juna Bazaar, Sassoon Hospital, Pune Station, Ruby Hall Clinic, Bund Garden, Yerwada, Shastri Nagar, Nagar Road, Ramwadi, Viman Nagar, Chandan Nagar, Kharadi Bypass, Aaple Ghar, Khandve Nagar, Wagholi, Kesnand Phata, Vitthalwadi, Lonikand, Koregaon Bhima, Vadhu Bk, Chouphula, Karandi	Na.Ta.Wadi
163	Pune Station	Dhole Patil College/Kharadi	Dengale Pul, Juna Bazaar, Sassoon Hospital, Pune Station, Ruby Hall Clinic, Bund Garden, Yerwada, Shastri Nagar, Nagar Road, Ramwadi, Viman Nagar, Chandan Nagar, Kharadi Bypass, Yashwant Nagar, Kharadi, Eon IT Park, Tulja Bhawani Nagar, Barclays LTS Campus	Wagholi
164	PMC	Nhavare	Dengale Pul, Juna Bazaar, Sassoon Hospital, Pune Station, Ruby Hall Clinic, Bund Garden, Yerwada, Shastri Nagar, Nagar Road, Ramwadi, Viman Nagar, Chandan Nagar, Kharadi Bypass, Aaple Ghar, Khandve Nagar, Wagholi, Kesnand Phata, Vitthalwadi, Lonikand, Koregaon Bhima, Sanaswadi, Shikrapur, Talegaon Dhamdhere, Malwadi, Nimgaon Mahalungi, Satkarwadi, Uralgaon	Na.Ta.Wadi
165	PMC	Vadgaon Sheri	Dengale Pul, Juna Bazaar, Sassoon Hospital, Pune Station, Ruby Hall Clinic, Bund Garden, Yerwada, Shastri Nagar, Nagar Road, Ramwadi, Viman Nagar, Brahma Suncity, New Kalyani Nagar	Na.Ta.Wadi
166	Pune Station	MHADA Colony/Viman Nagar	Ruby Hall Clinic, Bund Garden, Yerwada, Shastri Nagar, Nagar Road, Ramwadi, Viman Nagar, Clover Park	Pune Station
167	Wagholi	Bhekrainagar	Kesnand Phata, Khandve Nagar, Aaple Ghar, Kharadi Bypass, Chandan Nagar, Kharadi, Columbia Hospital, Mundhwa, Kirtane Baug, Magarpatta, Hadapsar Gaon, Hadapsar Gadital, Satavwadi, Tukai Darshan	Wagholi, Bhekrainagar
168	Shaniwar Wada	Keshav Nagar	Kasba Peth, Kumbharwada, Juna Bazaar, Collector Office, Westend, Pune Cantonment, Ghorpadi Lines, Ghorpadi, Army College, Mundhwa, Lonkar Vasti, Ghule Vasti	Na.Ta.Wadi
169	Shaniwar Wada	Keshav Nagar	Same route as mentioned for Route 160	Na.Ta.Wadi
170	Pune Station	Kondhwa Budruk	Pune Station Depot, GPO, Westend, MG Road, Camp, Pulgate, Army College, Wanowrie, Mahadji Shinde Chhatri, Netaji Nagar, Fakhri Hills, Kausar Baug, Kondhwa	Pune Station
172	Pune Station	Yewalewadi	Pune Station Depot, GPO, Collector Office, Rasta Peth, Nana Peth, Ramoshi Gate, 7 Loves Chowk, Apsara Talkies, Gultekdi, Marketyard, Marketyard Depot, Hyde Park, Gangadham, Kakade Vasti, Omkar Nagar, Ashraf Nagar, Kondhwa Budruk, Shelar Nagar, Kamthe Nagar	Pune Station
174	Pune Station	NDA Gate	Pune Station Depot, GPO, Westend, MG Road, Sharbatwala Chowk, Quarter Gate, Nana Peth, Budhwar Peth, City Post, Laxmi Road, Narayan Peth, Alka Talkies, Deccan Corner, Garware College, Erandwane, Nalstop, Paud Phata, Karve Road, Kothrud Stand, Karve Nagar, Hingne Budruk, Galinde Path Warje Naka, Tapodham, Ganpati Matha, Warje Malwadi, Shivane, Uttam Nagar, Kondhwa Dhavade	Na.Ta.Wadi
175	PMC	Hadapsar Gadital	Dengale Pul, Juna Bazaar, Collector Office, GPO, Westend, Pune Cantonment, Nirman Vihar, Ghorpadi Lines, Ghorpadi, Bharat Forge Road, Sai Park, Dalvi Nagar, Shirke Company, Shinde Vasti, Hadapsar MIDC, Vaiduwadi	Hadapsar
177	Pune Station Depot	Salunkhe Vihar	GPO, Westend, MG Road, Camp, Pulgate, Racecourse, Fatima Nagar, Parmar Nagar, Natraj Enclave, Wanowrie, Oxford Society	Pune Station
179	Hadapsar Gadital	Lohegaon	Hadapsar Gaon, Magarpatta, Kirtane Baug, Mundhwa, Columbia Hospital, Kharadi, Yashwant Nagar, Kharadi Bypass, Chandan Nagar, Viman Nagar, Phoenix Marketcity Mall, Ganga Hamlet, MHADA Colony, Pune International Airport, Air Force Station	Hadapsar
180	Narveer Tanaji Wadi	Bhekrainagar	Shivaji Nagar, PMC, Shaniwar Wada, Ganesh Road, Raviwar Peth, Phadke Haud, Rasta Peth, Nana Peth, Ramoshi Gate, 7 Loves Chowk, Shankar Sheth Road, Golibar Maidan, Camp, Pulgate, Racecourse, Fatima Nagar, Bhairoba Nala, Ramtekdi, Hadapsar Gadital, Satavwadi, Tukai Darshan	Na.Ta.Wadi
181	Narveer Tanaji Wadi	Kondhwa Budruk	Shivaji Nagar, PMC, Shaniwar Wada, Ganesh Road, Raviwar Peth, Phadke Haud, Rasta Peth, Nana Peth, Ramoshi Gate, Bhawani Peth, Juna Motor Stand Chowk, Mahatma Phule Road, Camp, Pulgate, Armed Forces Medical College, Wanowrie, Mahadji Shinde Chhatri, Netaji Nagar, Lulla Nagar, Fakhri Hills, NIBM Phata, Kondhwa Khurd	Na.Ta.Wadi
182	Narveer Tanaji Wadi	Shewalewadi	Shivaji Nagar, PMC, Dengale Pul, Juna Bazaar, Collector Office, GPO, Westend, MG Road, Camp, Pulgate, Racecourse, Fatima Nagar, Bhairoba Nala, Ramtekdi, Hadapsar Gadital, Manjari Phata	Na.Ta.Wadi
183	Hadapsar Gadital	Theur/Kolawadi	Manjari Phata, Shewalewadi, Loni Kalbhor, Dhumal Mala, Theur Phata, Gosavi Vasti, Chavan Vasti, Theur Gaon	Hadapsar
184	Hadapsar Gadital	Ramdara Mandir	Manjari Phata, Shewalewadi, Loni Kalbhor, Pashankar Mala, Sitaram Mala, Kolape Vasti, Ramdara Railway Phatak	Hadapsar
185	Hadapsar Gadital	Wagholi	Manjari Phata, Mahadev Nagar, Gopalpatti, Manjari Budruk, Belekar Vasti, Manjari Gaon, Manjari Khurd, Awhalwadi, Satav Park, Kalubai Nagar, Kesnand Phata	Hadapsar
186	Hadapsar Gadital	JSPM College Satav Nagar		Hadapsar
201	Bhekrainagar	Alandi	Tukai Darshan, Satavwadi, Hadapsar Gadital, Hadapsar, Vaiduwadi, Ramtekdi, Bhairoba Nala, Fatima Nagar, Racecourse, Pulgate, MG Road, Camp, Westend, Sassoon Hospital, Pune Station, Ruby Hall Clinic, Bund Graden, Yerwada, Jail Road, Nagpur Chawl, 509 Chowk, Tingre Nagar, Vishrantwadi, Kalas, Dighi, Magazine Chowk, Sai Mandir, Wadmukhwadi, Charholi Phata, Dehu Phata	Bhekrainagar
202	Shewalewadi	Warje Malwadi	Manjari Phata, Hadapsar Gadital, Hadapsar, Vaiduwadi, Ramtekdi, Bhairoba Nala, Fatima Nagar, Racecourse, Pulgate, Phule Road, Juna Motorstand Chowk, Kashewadi, Ramoshi Gate, AD Camp Chowk, Nana Peth, Raviwar Peth, City Post, Laxmi Road, Narayan Peth, Alka Talkies, Deccan Corner, Garware College, Erandwane, Nalstop, Paud Phata, Karve Road, Kothrud Stand, Karve Nagar, Hingne Budruk, Galinde Path/Warje Naka, Tapodham	Shewalewadi
204	Bhekrainagar	Chinchwad	Tukai Darshan, Satavwadi, Hadapsar Gadital, Hadapsar, Vaiduwadi, Ramtekdi, Bhairoba Nala, Fatima Nagar, Racecourse, Pulgate, MG Road, Camp, Westend, GPO, Juna Bazaar, Dengle Pul, PMC, Shivaji Nagar, Pune University, Bremen Chowk, Aundh, Sangvi Phata, Rakshak Chowk, Jagtap Dairy, Kalewadi Phata, Dange Chowk, Datta Nagar, Chaphekar Chowk	Bhekrainagar
207	Swargate	Saswad	Shankar Sheth Road, Golibar Maidan, Pulgate, Racecourse, Fatima Nagar, Bhairoba Nala, Ramtekdi, Vadiuwadi, Hadapsar, Hadapsar Gadital, Satavwadi, Tukai Darshan, Bhekrainagar, Saswad Road, Mantarwadi, Kamte Vasti, Pimpalmala, Wadki, Wadki Nala, Dive Ghat, Zendewadi, Jadhavwadi, Dive Gaon, Saswad Jakat Naka, Chandan Tekdi, Saswad ST Stand	Swargate
208	Bhekrainagar	Hinjewadi Phase 3	Tukai Darshan, Satavwadi, Hadapsar, Vaiduwadi, Ramtekdi, Bhairoba Nala, Fatima Nagar, Pulgate, Camp, Westend, GPO, Collector Office, Juna Bazaar, Dengle Pul, PMC, Shivaji Nagar, Pune University, Sakal Nagar, Sindhi Colony, Baner, Radha Chowk, Balewadi Stadium, Wakad Bridge, Phase 1/2, Wipro Circle	Bhekrainagar
209	Katraj	Saswad	Bibwewadi Annexe, Kondhwa Budruk, Khadi Machine Chowk, Yewalewadi, Bopdev Ghat, Askarwadi, Bhivri, Ghisarewadi, Aksarwadi, Garadegaon, Garade Dam, Kodit Budruk, Mhalasakant Colony	Katraj
210	Hadapsar	Jejuri MIDC	Satavwadi, Tukai Darshan, Bhekrainagar, Saswad Road, Mantarwadi, Kamte Vasti, Pimpalmala, Wadki, Wadki Nala, Dive Ghat, Zendewadi, Jadhavwadi, Dive Gaon, Saswad Jakat Naka, Chandan Tekdi, Saswad, Ekhatpur, Shivri, Takarewadi, Jejuri Rural, Jejuri	Hadapsar
211	Saswad	Uruli Kanchan	Kumbharvalan, Vanpuri, Udachiwadi, Singapur, Waghapur, Chaufula, Shindavane Ghat, Shindavane	Hadapsar
212	Hadapsar	Morgaon	Satavwadi, Tukai Darshan, Bhekrainagar, Saswad Road, Mantarwadi, Kamte Vasti, Pimpalmala, Wadki, Wadki Nala, Dive Ghat, Zendewadi, Jadhavwadi, Dive Gaon, Saswad Jakat Naka, Chandan Tekdi, Saswad, Ekhatpur, Shivri, Takarewadi, Jejuri Rural, Jejuri, Mavadi Kadepathar, Chorachiwadi	
213	Hadapsar	Nira	Satavwadi, Tukai Darshan, Bhekrainagar, Saswad Road, Mantarwadi, Kamte Vasti, Pimpalmala, Wadki, Wadki Nala, Dive Ghat, Zendewadi, Jadhavwadi, Dive Gaon, Saswad Jakat Naka, Chandan Tekdi, Saswad, Ekhatpur, Shivri, Takarewadi, Jejuri Rural, Jejuri, Jejuri MIDC, Jagtap Mala, Daundaj, Walhe, Kamathwadi, Pisurti, Thopatewadi, Pimpre Khurd	
214	Katraj	Sinhagad College	Katraj Bypass, D-Mart, Ambegaon, Indu Lawns	
215	Swargate	Ambegaon College	Laxmi Narayan Talkies, Sahakar Nagar, Sarang Society, Parvati Paytha, Padmavati, KK Market, Dhankawadi, Mohan Nagar, Ambegaon Budruk	
216	Shivaji Nagar	Bharti Vidyapeeth	COEP Hostel, PMC, Shaniwar Wada, Budhwar Peth, Mandai, Shukrawar Peth, Swargate, Laxmi Narayan Talkies, Mukund Nagar, Padmavati, Vasant Baug, Balaji Nagar, Sarpodyan, Katraj Dairy	
219	Kothrud Depot	Alandi	Vanaz, Anand Nagar, Ideal Colony, Nalstop, Garware College, Deccan Gymkhana, FC Road, Modern College, PMC, Shivaji Nagar, Wakdewadi, Mula Road, Bombay Sappers, Phule Nagar, VIshrantwadi, Kalas, Dighi, Magazine Chowk, Wadmukhwadi, Charholi Phata, Dehu Phata	
302	Pimpri	Bhosari	Buddha Nagar, Pimpri Station, PCMC, Pimpri Colony, Kharalwadi, Nehru Nagar, Pimpri MIDC, Thermax Company, Landewadi, Gavhane Vasti	Pimpri
302A	Pimpri	Alandi	Buddha Nagar, Pimpri Station, PCMC, Pimpri Colony, Kharalwadi, Nehru Nagar, Pimpri MIDC, Thermax Company, Landewadi, Gavhane Vasti, Bhosari, Ramnagar, Gajanan Nagar, Magazine Chowk, Sai Mandir, Wadmukhwadi, Charholi Phata, Dehu Phata	Pimpri
302B	Pimpri	Bopkhel	Buddha Nagar, Pimpri Station, PCMC, Pimpri Colony, Kharalwadi, Nehru Nagar, Pimpri MIDC, Thermax Company, Landewadi, Gavhane Vasti, Bhosari, Ramnagar, Gajanan Nagar, Magazine Chowk, Dighi, Ganesh Nagar	Pimpri
303	Nigdi/Pradhikaran Chowk	Akurdi Station	Bhakti Shakti, Nigdi Depot, Appu Ghar, Big India, Tilak Road, Pradhikaran, Ganga Nagar, Kirloskar Chowk, Bijli Nagar	Nigdi
303A	Nigdi/Pradhikaran Chowk	Gahunje	Bhakti Shakti, Nigdi Depot, Appu Ghar, PCMC Water Treatment Plant, Swapnapurti, Akurdi Station, DY Patil University, Shinde Vasti, Ravet Corner, Ravet, Mukai Chowk, Kiwale, Mumbai Expressway Service Road, Lodha Belmondo Society	Nigdi
304	Chinchwad	Bhosari	Tanaji Nagar, Elpro School, Chinchwad Station, Shivaji Chowk, Mohan Nagar, KSB Chowk, Tata Motors, Yashwant Nagar, Indrayani Nagar, Telco Road, Landewadi, Gavhane Vasti	Bhosari, Pimpri
305	Nigdi/Pradhikaran Chowk	Vadgaon Maval	Bhakti Shakti, Durga Tekdi, Dehu Road, Begdewadi, Ghoravadeshwar Hill, Somatane Phata, Tukaram Nagar, Ghorawadi, Maruti Mandir, Talegaon Dabhade, Swaraj Nagari, Urse Phata	Nigdi
305A	Nigdi/Pradhikaran Chowk	Navlakh Umbare/Greenbase Park	Bhakti Shakti, Durga Tekdi, Dehu Road, Begdewadi, Ghoravadeshwar Hill, Somatane Phata, Tukaram Nagar, Ghorawadi, Maruti Mandir, Talegaon Dabhade, Swaraj Nagari, Urse Phata, Vadgaon Maval, Katvi, Ambi, Talegaon MIDC, Koyate Vasti	Nigdi
305B	Nigdi/Pradhikaran Chowk	Mindewadi/Emerson	Bhakti Shakti, Durga Tekdi, Dehu Road, Begdewadi, Ghoravadeshwar Hill, Somatane Phata, Tukaram Nagar, Ghorawadi, Maruti Mandir, Talegaon Dabhade, Swaraj Nagari, Urse Phata, Vadgaon Maval, Katvi, Ambi, Talegaon MIDC, Koyate Vasti, Navlakh Umbare, Badhalewadi, Bhama Dam Phata	Nigdi
305C	Nigdi/Pradhikaran Chowk	Takave/Phalane Phata	Bhakti Shakti, Durga Tekdi, Dehu Road, Begdewadi, Ghoravadeshwar Hill, Somatane Phata, Tukaram Nagar, Ghorawadi, Talegaon Dabhade, Maruti Mandir, Swaraj Nagari, Urse Phata, Vadgaon Maval, Mauli Nagar, Kanhe Phata, Kanhe, Kanhe Station, Mahindra Steel, Takave Budruk, Takave Gaon	Nigdi
306	Hinjewadi Phase 3	Dange Chowk	Megapolis Society, Tech Mahindra, Wipro Phase 2, Hinjewadi Phase 1, Mezza Nine, Shivaji Chowk, Bhumkar Nagar, Bhumkar Chowk, Wakad	Balewadi
306A	Dange Chowk	Nere/Hinjewadi Hills Society	Wakad, Bhumkar Chowk, Bhumkar Nagar, Shivaji Chowk, Hinjewadi Phase 1, Mukai Nagar, Laxmi Chowk, Shinde Nagar, Marunji, Nere	Baner
307	Chinchwad	Ravet/Shinde Vasti	Chaphekar Chowk, Chinchwade Nagar, Walhekarwadi, Ravet Corner, Ravet Sector 29, ISKCON Mandir	Balewadi
308	Nigdi/Pradhikaran Chowk	Gharkul Vasahat	Bajaj Auto, Yamuna Nagar, Thermax Chowk, Phule Nagar, Spine Road	Nigdi
309	Alandi	Dehu Gaon	Dehu Phata, Dudulgaon, Dhayarkar Vasti, Moshi, Jadhavwadi, Tupe Vasti, Chikhali, Patil Nagar, Shelar Vasti, Talawade, Fujitsu Company, Vitthalwadi	Bhosari
311	Pune Station Depot	Pimpri	GPO, Collector Office, Sassoon Hospital, Pune Station, Ruby Hall Clinic, Bund Garden, Yerwada, Deccan College, Bombay Sappers, Khadki, Khadki Bazaar, Bopodi, Dapodi, Phugewadi, Kasarwadi, Nashik Phata, Vallabh Nagar, Sant Tukaram Nagar, YCM Hospital, Nehru Nagar, Kharalwadi, Pimpri Colony, Pimpri Chowk, Pimpri Station, Shagun Chowk	Pune Station
312	Pune Station Depot	Chinchwad	GPO, Collector Office, Sassoon Hospital, Pune Station, Ruby Hall Clinic, Bund Garden, Yerwada, Deccan College, Bombay Sappers, Khadki, Khadki Bazaar, Bopodi, Dapodi, Phugewadi, Kasarwadi, Nashik Phata, Vallabh Nagar, Sant Tukaram Nagar, YCM Hospital, Nehru Nagar, Kharalwadi, Pimpri Colony, Pimpri Chowk, Pimpri Station, Bhat Nagar, Gawade Nagar, Tanaji Nagar	Pune Station
313	Chinchwad	Chandkhed	Chaphekar Chowk, Datta Nagar, Thergaon Phata, Dange Chowk, Wakad, Bhumkar Chowk, Bhumkar Nagar, Shivaji Chowk, Hinjewadi Phase 1, Mukai Nagar, Laxmi Chowk, Shinde Nagar, Marunji, Nere, Kasarsai	Balewadi
314	Nigdi/Pradhikaran Chowk	Mahalunge Ingale/Dwarka Township	Bajaj Auto, Yamuna Nagar, Triveni Nagar, Talawade, Fujitsu Company, Mahindra Company, Mahalunge Endurance, Mahalunge Ingale	Nigdi
315	Pune Station	Bhosari	Ruby Hall Clinic, Bund Garden, Yerwada, Nagpur Chawl, 509 Chowk, Tingre Nagar, Vishrantwadi, Kalas, Dighi, Magazine Chowk, Gajanan Nagar, Ramnagar	Pune Station
316	Chinchwad	Khamboli	Chaphekar Chowk, Datta Nagar, Thergaon Phata, Dange Chowk, Wakad, Bhumkar Chowk, Bhumkar Nagar, Shivaji Chowk, Hinjewadi Phase 1, Wipro Phase 2, Tech Mahindra, Megapolis Society, Hinjewadi Phase 3, Godambewadi, Rihe Phata, Shelkewadi, Materewadi, Rihe, Rihe Dam, Borkarwadi, Kemsewadi, Pimpoli	Balewadi
317	Pune Station Depot	Sambhaji Nagar	GPO, Collector Office, Sassoon Hospital, Pune Station, Tadiwala Road, Mangalwar Gadital, Shivaji Nagar, Wakdewadi, Khadki, Bopodi, Dapodi, Phugewadi, Kasarwadi, Nashik Phata, Vallabh Nagar, Pimpri, PCMC, Chinchwad, Ganga Nagar Corner, Akurdi, Nigdi, Pradhikaran Chowk, Bajaj Auto, Yamuna Nagar, Thermax Chowk, Phule Nagar	Pune Station
320	Hinjewadi Phase 3	Chinchwad	Maan, Thakar Nagar, Hinjewadi Phase 1, Shivaji Chowk, Bhumkar Nagar, Bhumkar Chowk, Wakad, Dange Chowk, Thergaon Phata, Datta Nagar, Chaphekar Chowk	Balewadi
321	Hinjewadi Phase 3	Eternity Company	Megapolis Society, Synechron	Baner
322	PMC	Akurdi Station	Shivaji Nagar, Pune University, Bremen Chowk, Aundh, Sangvi Phata, Navi Sangvi, Sangvi, Pimple Gurav, Sudarshan Nagar, Pimple Saudagar, Rahatani, Kalewadi, Tapkir Chowk, Keshav Nagar, Chinchwad, Chaphekar Chowk, Chinchwade Nagar, Bijli Nagar, Pradhikaran	Nigdi
322A	PMC	Akurdi Station	Shivaji Nagar, Pune University, Bremen Chowk, Aundh, Sangvi Phata, Navi Sangvi, Sangvi, Pimple Gurav, Sudarshan Nagar, Pimple Saudagar, Pimpri, Buddha Nagar, Bhat Nagar, Gawade Nagar, Tanaji Nagar, Chinchwad, Chaphekar Chowk, Chinchwade Nagar, Bijli Nagar, Pradhikaran	Nigdi
323	PMC	Chikhali (Nageshwar Vidyalaya)	Shivaji Nagar, Wakdewadi, Khadki, Bopodi, Dapodi, Phugewadi, Kasarwadi, Nashik Phata, Vallabh Nagar, Sant Tukaram Nagar, YCM Hospital, Nehru Nagar, Zero Boys Chowk, Yashwant Nagar, Tata Motors, Himat Nagar, Jaguar/Land Rover, Jadhavwadi, Sahyog Nagar, Patil Nagar	Pimpri
323A	PMC	Gharkul Vasahat	Shivaji Nagar, Wakdewadi, Khadki, Bopodi, Dapodi, Phugewadi, Kasarwadi, Nashik Phata, Vallabh Nagar, Sant Tukaram Nagar, YCM Hospital, Nehru Nagar, Zero Boys Chowk, Yashwant Nagar, Tata Motors, KSB Chowk, Shahu Nagar, Atal Bihari Vajpayee Udayan, Shivatej Nagar, Spine Road	Pimpri
324	Hinjewadi Phase 3	Bhosari	Megapolis Society, Tech Mahindra, Wipro Phase 2, Hinjewadi Phase 1, Bhujbal Vasti, Wakad, Kaspate Vasti, Jagtap Dairy, Kalewadi, Pimple Saudagar, Kashid Park, Kasarwadi, Nashik Phata, Landewadi, Gavhane Vasti	Bhosari
325	Pune Station	Pimple Saudagar	Pune Station Depot, GPO, Collector Office, Juna Bazaar, Dengale Pul, PMC, Shivaji Nagar, Pune University, Bremen Chowk, Aundh, Sangvi Phata, Rakshak Chowk, Jagtap Dairy, Kalewadi	Pune Station
326	Pimpri	Chikhali (Nageshwar Vidyalaya)	Buddha Nagar, Pimpri Station, PCMC, Morwadi, KSB Chowk, Tata Motors, Shahu Nagar, Spine Road, Jadhavwadi, Sahyog Nagar, Patil Nagar	Pimpri
327	Hinjewadi Phase 3	Alandi	Megapolis Society, Tech Mahindra, Wipro Phase 2, Hinjewadi Phase 1, Bhujbal Vasti, Wakad, Datta Mandir, Dange Chowk, Thergaon Phata, Datta Nagar, Chaphekar Chowk, Chinchwad, Tanaji Nagar, Elpro School, Chinchwad Station, Shivaji Chowk, Mohan Nagar, KSB Chowk, Tata Motors, Yashwant Nagar, Telco Road, Indrayani Nagar, Landewadi, Gavhane Vasti, Bhosari, Ramnagar, Gajanan Nagar, Magazine Chowk, Sai Mandir, Wadmukhwadi, Charholi Phata, Dehu Phata	Pimpri
329	Nigdi/Pradhikaran Chowk	Dehu Kridangan	Bhakti Shakti, Durga Tekdi, Dehu Road, Dehu Road Station, Dehu Cantonment, Chincholi, Mali Nagar, Dehu Gaon, Sant Tukaram Mandir	Nigdi
330	Alandi	Talegaon Maruti Mandir	Dudulgaon, Dhayarkar Wadi, Moshi, Tupe Vasti, Jadhavwadi, Patil Nagar, Chikhali, Shelarvasti, Talawade, Fujitsu Company, Vitthalwadi, Dehu Gaon, Yelwadi, Manohar Nagar, Sudhavwadi, Indori, Malwadi, Talegaon Station, Talegaon Dabhade	Pimpri
331	Pimple Saudagar	Bhosari	Rahatani, Tapkir Chowk, Kalewadi, Pimpri, Buddha Nagar, Pimpri Station, KSB Chowk, PCMC, Pimpri Chowk, Pimpri Colony, Kharalwadi, Nehru Nagar, Pimpri MIDC, Thermax Company, Landewadi, Gavhane Vasti	Pimpri
331A	Pimple Saudagar	Charholi	Rahatani, Tapkir Chowk, Kalewadi, Pimpri, Buddha Nagar, Pimpri Station, PCMC, Pimpri Chowk, Pimpri Colony, Kharalwadi, Nehru Nagar, Pimpri MIDC, Thermax Company, Landewadi, Gavhane Vasti, Bhosari, Ramnagar, Gajanan Nagar, Magazine Chowk, Sai Mandir, Wadmukhwadi, Charholi Phata, Kotwalwadi	Pimpri
333	Pune Station	Hinjewadi Phase 3	Pune Station Depot, GPO, Collector Office, Juna Bazaar, Dengale Pul, PMC, Shivaji Nagar, Pune University, Bremen Chowk, Aundh, Sangvi Phata, Rakshak CXhowk, Panchsheel Nagar, Pimple Nilakh, Vishal Nagar, Kaspate Vasti, Wakad, Bhujbal Vasti, Hinjewadi Phase 1, Wipro Phase 2, Tech Mahindra, Megapolis Society	Pune Station
334	Pimpri	Gharkul Vasahat	Buddha Nagar, Pimpri Station, PCMC, Morwadi, KSB Chowk, Shahu Nagar, Shivatej Nagar	Nigdi
335	Dange Chowk	Sangawade	Tathawade, Borgewadi, Dattawadi, Pandhare Vasti, Kate Vasti, Punawale, Malwadi, Rasikwadi, Jambhe	Nigdi
336	Nigdi/Bhakti Shakti	Wagholi	Bhakti Shakti, Pradhikaran Chowk, Akurdi, Ganga Nagar Corner, Chinchwad, PCMC, Pimpri, Vallabh Nagar, Nashik Phata, Kasarwadi, Phugewadi, Dapodi, Bopodi, Khadki Bazaar, Khadki, Bombay Sappers, Deccan College, Yerwada, Shastri Nagar, Ramwadi, Viman Nagar, Chandan Nagar, Kharadi Bypass, Aaple Ghar, Khandve Nagar, Kesnand Phata	Nigdi, Wagholi
337	Chinchwad	Wagholi	Keshav Nagar, Morya Raj Park, Tapkir Chowk, Rahatani, Pimple Saudagar, Sudarshan Nagar, Pimple Gurav, Katepuram, Sangvi, Navi Sangvi, Juni Sangvi, Chandramani Nagar, Dapodi, Bopodi, Khadki Bazaar, Khadki, Bombay Sappers, Deccan College, Yerwada, Shastri Nagar, Nagar Road, Ramwadi, Viman Nagar, Chandan Nagar, Kharadi Bypass, Aaple Ghar, Khandve Nagar, Kesnand Phata	Balewadi
339	Katraj	Santnagar RTO	Katraj Zoo, Dhankawadi, Balaji Nagar, Padmavati, Natubaug, Bhapkar Pump, Swargate, Sarasbaug, SP College, Tilak Road, Alka Talkies, Goodluck Chowk, Deccan Gymkhana, FC Road, Shivaji Nagar, Wakdewadi, Khadki, Bopodi, Dapodi, Phugewadi, Kasarwadi, Nashik Phata, Bhosari MIDC, Landewadi, Gavhane Vasti, Bhosari, Bhosari Depot, Sadgurunagar, Dhawade Vasti, Indrayani Nagar, Bhosari Sector 7, Spine Road, Santnagar	Bhosari
340	Nigdi/Pradhikaran Chowk	Alandi	Bajaj Auto, Yamuna Nagar, Thermax Chowk, Phule Nagar, Spine Road, Gharkul Vasahat, Jadhavwadi Phata, Kudalwadi, Bhosari Sector 11, Santnagar, PCNTDA, Godown Chowk, Tapkir Nagar, Alankapuram, Wadmukhwadi, Charholi Phata, Dehu Phata	Nigdi
341	Nigdi/Pradhikaran	Urse Gaon	Bhakti Shakti, Durga Tekdi, Dehu Road, Begdewadi, Ghoravadeshwar Hill, Somatane Phata, Tukaram Nagar, Ghorawadi, Maruti Mandir, Talegaon Dabhade, Urse Phata, Talegaon Toll Plaza, Finolex Company	Nigdi
342	Nigdi/Pradhikaran	Urse Gaon	Bhakti Shakti, Durga Tekdi, Dehu Road, Begdewadi, Ghoravadeshwar Hill, Somatane Phata, Chourai Nagar, Bhote Vasti, Parandwadi	Nigdi
343	Chakan/Ambethan Chowk	Talegaon Dabhade	Chakan, Talegaon Chowk, Kharabwadi, Chakan MIDC, Lumax Company, Mahalunge Ingale, Khalumbre, Manohar Nagar, Sudhawadi, Indori, Malwadi, Talegaon Station	Bhosari
344	Baner Depot	Alandi	Baner, Balewadi Phata, Adarsh Nagar, Pimple Nilakh, Vishal Nagar, Kaspate Vasti, Wakad, Kalewadi Phata, Tapkir Chowk, Kalewadi, Pimpri, Buddha Nagar, Pimpri Station, Finolex Chowk, PCMC, Pimpri Chowk, Kharalwadi, Pimpri Colony, Nehru Nagar, YCM Hospital, Bhosari MIDC, Landewadi, Gavhane Vasti, Bhosari, Ramnagar, Gajanan Nagar, Magazine Chowk, Sai Mandir, Wadmukhwadi, Charholi Phata, Dehu Phata	Baner
345	Hinjewadi Phase 3	Bhosari	Same route as mentioned for Route 324	Baner
346	Bhosari	Wagholi	Ramnagar, Gajanan Nagar, Magazine Chowk, Dighi, Kalas, Vishrantwadi, Bhairav Nagar, Dhanori, Lohegaon, Adarsh Nagar, Diamond Waterpark, Wagholi Depot, Kesnand Phata	Wagholi
347	Sangvi	Alandi	Chandramani Nagar, Juni Sangvi, Navi Sangvi, Pimple Gurav, Gangotri Nagar, Dapodi, Phugewadi, Kasarwadi, Nashik Phata, Landewadi, Gavhane Vasti, Bhosari, Ramnagar, Gajanan Nagar, Magazine Chowk, Sai Mandir, Wadmukhwadi, Charholi Phata, Dehu Phata	Pimpri
348	Pune Station	Nigdi Bhakti Shakti	Pune Station Depot, GPO, Collector Office, Juna Bazaar, Mangalwar Gadital, Shivaji Nagar, Pune University, Bremen Chowk, Aundh, Sangvi Phata, Rakshak Chowk, Jagtap Dairy, Kalewadi Phata, Dange Chowk, Thergaon Phata, Datta Nagar, Chaphekar Chowk, Chinchwad, SKF Company, Bhoir Nagar, Ganga Nagar Corner, Akurdi, Bhakti Shakti	Nigdi
350	Nigdi/Pradhikaran	Dehu Gaon	Bajaj Auto, Yamuna Nagar, Triveni Nagar, Talwade, Fujitsu Company, Vitthalwadi	Nigdi
351	Jambhe	Alandi	Rasikwadi, Punawale, Dattawadi, Tathawade, Dange Chowk, Datta Nagar, Chaphekar Chowk, Chinchwad, Chinchwad Station, Shivaji Chowk, Mohan Nagar, KSB Chowk, Tata Motors/Telco Company, Telco Road, Yashwant Nagar, Gavli Matha, Indrayani Nagar, Landewadi, Gavhane Vasti, Bhosari, Ramnagar, Gajanan Nagar, Magazine Chowk, Sai Mandir, Wadmukhwadi, Charholi Phata, Dehu Phata	Bhosari
352	Pune Station	Rajgurunagar	Juna Bazaar, RTO Office, Shivaji Nagar, Wakdewadi, Khadki, Bopodi, Dapodi, Phugewadi, Kasarwadi, Nashik Phata, Landewadi, Gavhane Vasti, Bhosari, Sadgurunagar, Gandharv Nagari, Moshi, Chimbali Phata, Kurali, Alandi Phata, Chakan, Talegaon Chowk, Ambethan Chowk, Waki Khurd, Bham Gaon, Shiroli	Bhosari
353	Chakan	Shikrapur	Kadhachiwadi, Rase Phata, Bhose, Shel Pimpalgaon, Mohitewadi, Bahul, Dabare Vasti, Sabalewadi, Chouphula, Pimple Jagtap, Jate Gaon Phata	Wagholi
353A	Chakan	Wagholi	Kadhachiwadi, Rase Phata, Bhose, Shel Pimpalgaon, Mohitewadi, Bahul, Dabare Vasti, Sabalewadi, Chouphula, Pimple Jagtap, Jate Gaon Phata, Shikrapur, Sanaswadi, Koregaon Bhima, Lonikand, Alandi Phata, Kesnand Phata	Wagholi
354	Marketyard	Pimpri	Gultekdi, Swargate, Sarasbaug, SP College, Tilak Road, Alka Talkies, Deccan Gymkhana, Goodluck Chowk, FC Road, Modern College, PMC, COEP Hostel, Shivaji Nagar, Pune University, Bremen Chowk, Aundh, Sangvi Phata, Navi Sangvi, Sangvi, Katepuram, Pimple Gurav, Kashid Park, Sudarshan Nagar, Pimple Saudagar, Rahatani, Tapkir Chowk, Kalewadi	Pimpri
355	Dange Chowk	Chikhali	Datta Nagar, Chaphekar Chowk, Chinchwad, SKF Company, Bhoir Nagar, Ganga Nagar Corner, Akurdi, Nigdi Pradhikaran Chowk, Bajaj Auto, Yamuna Nagar, Thermax Chowk, Phule Nagar, Sane Chowk, Vitthal Nagar, Keshav Nagar, Patil Nagar	Pimpri, Balewadi
355A	Baner Depot	Chikhali	Radha Chowk Baner, Mahalunge Stadium, Wakad Phata, Bhumkar Chowk, Wakad, Dange Chowk, Datta Nagar, Chaphekar Chowk, Chinchwad, SKF Company, Bhoir Nagar, Ganga Nagar Corner, Akurdi, Nigdi Pradhikaran Chowk, Bajaj Auto, Yamuna Nagar, Thermax Chowk, Phule Nagar, Sane Chowk Vitthal Nagar, Keshav Nagar, Patil Nagar	Baner
357	Pune Station	Bhosari	Pune Station Depot, GPO, Collector Office, Juna Bazaar, Mangalwar Gadital, Shivaji Nagar, Wakdewadi, Khadki, Bopodi, Dapodi, Phugewadi, Kasarwadi, Nashik Phata, Bhosari MIDC, Landewadi, Gavhane Vasti	Pune Station
358	Bhosari	Rajgurunagar	Bhosari Depot, Sadguru Nagar, Godown Chowk, Gandharv Nagari, Borhadewadi, Moshi, Dehu Phata, Chimbali Phata, Kurali, Alandi Phata, Chakan, Talegaon Chowk, Ambethan Chowk, Bham Gaon, Waki, Shiroli, Kharpudi Khurd	Bhosari
358A	Bhosari	Vasuli / This route is sometimes shortened till Chakan/Ambethan Chowk	Bhosari Depot, Sadguru Nagar, Godown Chowk, Gandharv Nagari, Borhadewadi, Moshi, Dehu Phata, Chimbali Phata, Kurali, Alandi Phata, Chakan, Talegaon Chowk, Ambethan Chowk, Biradwadi, Nighoje, Ambethan, Chakan MIDC, Bhamboli, Mahalunge Phata	Bhosari
359A	Pimple Gurav	Rajgurunagar	Kashid Park, Kasarwadi, Nashik Phata, Bhosari MIDC, Landewadi, Gavhane Vasti, Bhosari, Bhosari Depot, Sadguru Nagar, Godown Chowk, Gandharv Nagari, Borhadewadi, Moshi, Dehu Phata, Chimbali Phata, Kurali, Alandi Phata, Chakan, Talegaon Chowk, Ambethan Chowk, Bham Gaon, Waki, Shiroli, Kharpudi Khurd	Bhosari
360	Mahalunge	Alandi	Mahalunge Stadium, Radha Chowk Baner, Balewadi Depot, Balewadi, Balewadi High Street, Balewadi Phata, Baner, Sindhi Colony, Sanewadi, Parihar Chowk, Aundh, Sangvi Phata, Navi Sangvi, Sangvi, Pimple Gurav, Kashid Park, Kasarwadi, Nashik Phata, Bhosari MIDC, Landewadi, Gavhane Vasti, Bhosari, Ramnagar, Gajanan Nagar, Magazine Chowk, Wadmukhwadi, Charholi Phata, Dehu Phata	Balewadi
361	Bhosari	Alandi	Ramnagar, Gajanan Nagar, Magazine Chowk, Wadmukhwadi, Charholi Phata, Dehu Phata	Bhosari
362	YCM Hospital	Alandi	Nehru Nagar, Thermax Company, Landewadi, Gavhane Vasti, Bhosari, Ramnagar, Gajanan Nagar, Magazine Chowk, Wadmukhwadi, Charholi Phata, Dehu Phata	Pimpri
363	Nigdi/Pradhikaran Chowk	Ravet/Samir Lawns	Bhakti Shakti, Durga Tekdi, Dehu Road, Vikas Nagar, Adarsh Nagar, Mukai Chowk, Kiwale	Nigdi
364	Chakan	Alandi	Talegaon Chowk, Alandi Phata, Chakan Hill, MIT World Peace School, Hanumanwadi, Sambhaji Chowk	Bhosari
366	Pune Station	Nigdi Bhakti Shakti	Ruby Hall Clinic, Bund Garden, Yerwada, Deccan College, Bombay Sappers, Khadki, Khadki Bazar, Bopodi, Dapodi, Phugewadi, Kasarwadi, Nashik Phata, Vallabh Nagar, Pimpri, PCMC, Chinchwad, Ganga Nagar Corner, Akurdi	Pune Station
367	Nigdi/Pradhikaran Chowk	Bhosari	Bajaj Auto, Yamuna Nagar, Sambhaji Nagar, Bird Valley, KSB Chowk, Telco Company, Yashwant Nagar, Indrayani Nagar, Landewadi, Gavhane Vasti	Bhosari
367A	Akurdi Railway Station	Bhosari	Pradhikaran, Kirloskar Chowk, Ganga Nagar, Sant Dnyaneshwar Chowk, Big India, Appu Ghar, Nigdi Depot, Bhakti Shakti, Nigdi, Pradhikaran Chowk, Bajaj Auto, Yamuna Nagar, Sambhaji Nagar, Bird Valley, KSB Chowk, Telco Company, Yashwant Nagar, Indrayani Nagar, Landewadi, Gavhane Vasti	Bhosari
368	Nigdi/Pradhikaran Chowk	Lonavala/Railway Station	Bhakti Shakti, Durga Tekdi, Dehu Road, Begdewadi, Ghoravadeshwar Hill, Somatane Phata, Tukaram Nagar, Ghorawadi, Maruti Mandir, Talegaon Dabhade, Swaraj Nagari, Urse Phata, Vadgaon Maval, Mauli Nagar, Kanhe, Naigaon, Khadkale, Kamshet, Pathargaon, Wet n Joy Park, Shilatne, Karla, Waksai, Varsoli, Valvan, Lonavala ST Stand, Lonavala	Nigdi
369	Nigdi	Vasuli	Bajaj Auto, Yamuna Nagar, Krushna Nagar, Triveni Nagar, Rupee Nagar, Talwade, Tukaram Nagar, Fujitsu Company, Mahindra Company, Mahalunge Endurance Company, Harman Plant, HP Chowk, Thyssenkrupp Company, Bridgestone Company, Sawardari, Forbes Marshall Company, Bhamboli, Bhamchandra Caves	Nigdi
370	Bhosari	Davadi	Bhosari Depot, Sadgurunagar, Godown Chowk, Gandharv Nagari, Borhadewadi, Moshi, Dehu Phata, Chimbali Phata, Kurali, Alandi Phata, Chakan, Talegaon Chowk, Ambethan Chowk, Bham Gaon, Waki, Shiroli, Kharpudi Khurd, Rajgurunagar, Holewadi, Manjarewadi, Kharpudi Budruk, Ambe Ovhal, Nimgaon	Bhosari
372	Hinjewadi Phase 3	Nigdi/Bhakti Shakti	Megapolis Society, Wipro Circle, Infosys Phase 2, Hinjewadi Phase 1, Bhumkar Chowk, Wakad, Dange Chowk, Datta Nagar, Chinchwad, SKF Company, Bhoir Nagar, Ganga Nagar Corner, Akurdi, Pradhikaran Chowk	Nigdi, Balewadi
373	Hinjewadi Phase 3	Sangvi	Megapolis Society, Wipro Circle, Infosys Phase 2, Hinjewadi Phase 1, Bhujbal Chowk, Wakad Bridge, Wakad, Kaspate Vasti, Jagtap Dairy, Kalewadi Phata, Rahatani, Pimple Saudagar, Kashid Park, Pimple Gurav, Katepuram, Navi Sangvi	Baner
374	Nigdi/Pradhikaran Chowk	Mamurdi/Sai Nagar	Bhakti Shakti, Durga Tekdi, Dehu Road, Shitala Nagar, Mamurdi, MCA Stadium	Nigdi
374A	Nigdi/Pradhikaran Chowk	Gahunje	Bhakti Shakti, Durga Tekdi, Dehu Road, Shitala Nagar, Mamurdi, MCA Stadium, Expressway Bridge	Nigdi
375	Hinjewadi Phase 3/Eternity Company	Mukai Chowk Kiwale	Capgemini Company, Infosys Phase 2, Wipro Circle, Hinjewadi Phase 1, Laxmi Chowk, Marunji, Life Republic, Koyte Vasti, Punawale, Dattawadi, Samir Lawns Ravet, Kiwale	Baner
376	PMC	Pimpri	Shivaji Nagar, Wakdewadi, Khadki, Bopodi, Dapodi, Phugewadi, Kasarwadi, Nashik Phata, Vallabh Nagar, YCM Hospital, Nehru Nagar, Morwadi, PCMC, Pimpri Station, Shagun Chowk	Pimpri
380	Hinjewadi Phase 3	Bhosari		

=== ATAL Bus Routes ===
These are short feeder routes provided by some PMPML depots.

Route	Start	End	Via	Depot
AP2	Upper Depot	Katraj	Rajiv Gandhi Nagar, Sukhsagar Nagar, Rajas Society	Upper Depot
B1	PCMC Metro Station	Dighi	YCM Hospital, Nehru Nagar, Gavhane Vasti, Bhosari, Bharatmata Nagar, Magazine Chowk	Bhosari
B2	Alandi	Charholi	Dehu Phata, Charholi Phata, Mhasoba Chowk	Bhosari
H3	Hadapsar Gadital	Saswad Road Station	Sasane Nagar, Papade Wasti	Hadapsar
H6	Hadapsar Gadital	Mohammadwadi	Sasane Nagar, Chintamani Nagar, Sayyad Nagar	Hadapsar
H8	Hadapsar Gadital	Phursungi	Satavwadi, Shiv Shakti Chowk, Navade Wasti	Hadapsar
H9	Hadapsar Gadital	Gopalpatti	Manjari Road, Mahadev Nagar	Hadapsar
H11	Hadapsar Gadital	Sanket Vihar		Hadapsar
K7	Deccan Gymkhana	Dangat Estate	Garware College, Nalstop, Karve Road, Warje Naka, Warje Malwadi	Kothrud
K11	Katraj	Jambhulwadi		Katraj
K12	Katraj	Narhegaon		Katraj
K14	Katraj	Gujarwadi		Katraj
K16	Katraj	Yewalewadi		Katraj
K18	Katraj	Waghjainagar		Katraj
K21/VARTUL	Kothrud Depot	Bavdhan	Chandni Chowk, D Palace, Chellaram Hospital, LMD Chowk	Kothrud
N4A	Deccan Gymkhana	Niljyoti Society	FC Road, Model Colony, Vetal Baba Chowk, Kusalkar Putala, Janwadi	Na.Ta.Wadi
N14	Akurdi Station	Chinchwad	Chaphekar Chowk, Munjoba Vasahat, Walhekarwadi, Bhondve Corner, DY Patil College	Nigdi (Route is currently operated by Balewadi)
N15	Nigdi	Rupeenagar	Bhakti Shakti	Nigdi
N16	Akurdi/Khandoba Maal Chowk	Chikhali/Patil Nagar		Nigdi
P12	Pimpri Road	Kalewadi Phata		Pimpri
P13	PCMC Metro Station	Mukai Chowk Kiwale	Pimpri Station, Bhat Nagar, Chinchwad, Chaphekar Chowk, Chinchwade Nagar, Sayali Complex, Walhekarwadi, Ravet	Pimpri
S9	Swargate	Sahakar Nagar		Swargate

=== Metro Feeder Routes ===
Route	Start	End	Via
METRO2	Deccan Gymkhana Metro Station	Warje Malwadi	Garware College, Erandwane, Nalstop, Karve Road, Kothrud Stand, Karve Nagar, Hingne Budruk, Galinde Path Warje Naka, Tapodham, Ganpati Matha
METRO13	Civil Court Metro Station	Upper Depot	PMC, Shaniwar Wada, Mandai, Swargate, Vasantbaug, Bibwewadi
METRO17	Civil Court Metro Station	Hadapsar Gadital	Juna Bazaar, Camp, Pulgate, Ramtekdi
METRO19	Yerwada Metro Station	Pune International Airport	Gunjan Talkies, Yerwada, Jail Road, Nagpur Chawl, Burma Shell, Aeromall
METRO20	Ramwadi Metro Station	EON IT Park, Kharadi	Viman Nagar, Chandan Nagar, Kharadi Bypass, Kharadi, Free Zone
METRO31	PCMC Metro Station	Kalewadi Phata	Pimpri Chowk, Pimpri, Pimpri Station, Shagun Chowk, Kalewadi, Tapkir Chowk
METRO32	Bhosari(Nashik Phata)Metro Station	Nigdi	Vallabh Nagar, PCMC, Akurdi, Bhakti Shakti
METRO37	PCMC Metro Station	Akurdi Station	Pimpri Chowk, Pimpri, Pimpri Station, Shagun Chowk, Buddha Nagar, Bhat Nagar, Gawade Nagar, Tanaji Nagar, Chinchwad, Chaphekar Chowk, Bijli Nagar
METRO40/VARTUL	Dange Chowk	PCMC Metro Station	Chinchwad, PCMC Metro Stn, Pimpri Chowk, Shagun Chowk, Tapkir Chowk

A MSRTC bus

Maharashtra State Road Transport Corporation (MSRTC) runs buses, popularly known as ST (State Transport), from its three main bus stations in Shivajinagar, Pune Station and Swargate to all major cities and towns in Maharashtra and neighbouring states. Private companies too run buses to major cities throughout India.

== Rail ==
The city's main railway station is Pune Railway Station. The station is administrated by the Pune Railway Division of the Central Railways. There are many other railway stations within the urban area. Daily express trains connect Pune to major cities in the country. At Pune, there is diesel locomotive shed and electric trip shed.

=== Pune Suburban Railway ===
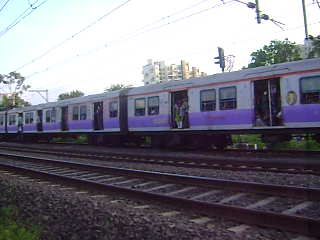
A suburban train on the Pune - Lonavla route

Pune Suburban Railway is a suburban rail system connecting Pune to its suburbs and neighboring villages in Pune District, Maharashtra. It is operated by Central Railway. Pune's suburban railway operates on two routes, i.e. from Pune Junction to Lonavala and its part, from Shivaji Nagar to Talegaon. There are 5 trains which operate on Shivaji Nagar - Talegaon route while 18 trains operate on Pune Junction - Lonavala route.

=== Pune Metro ===
Pune Metro is a currently under construction rapid transit system to serve the cities of Pune and Pimpri-Chinchwad. As of March 2018, Line 1 (Pimpri-Chinchwad - Swargate) and Line 2 (Vanaz - Ramwadi) with a combined length of 31.25 km are being constructed by Maharashtra Metro Rail Corporation Limited (MahaMetro), a 50:50 joint venture of the State and Central Governments. Lines 1 and 2 opened on March 6, 2022 with 12 km in operation. Line 3, which will cover a distance of 23.3 km between Hinjawadi and Shivajinagar, has been approved by the State and Central Governments. The Pune Metropolitan Region Development Authority (PMRDA) will implement the project on a public–private partnership (PPP) basis, for which it has shortlisted three companies: Tata Realty and Siemens, IRB in consortium with Chinese and Malaysian companies, and IL&FS. The bidding for Line 3 is expected by June 2018. All three lines will align at the Civil Court interchange station.

== Air ==
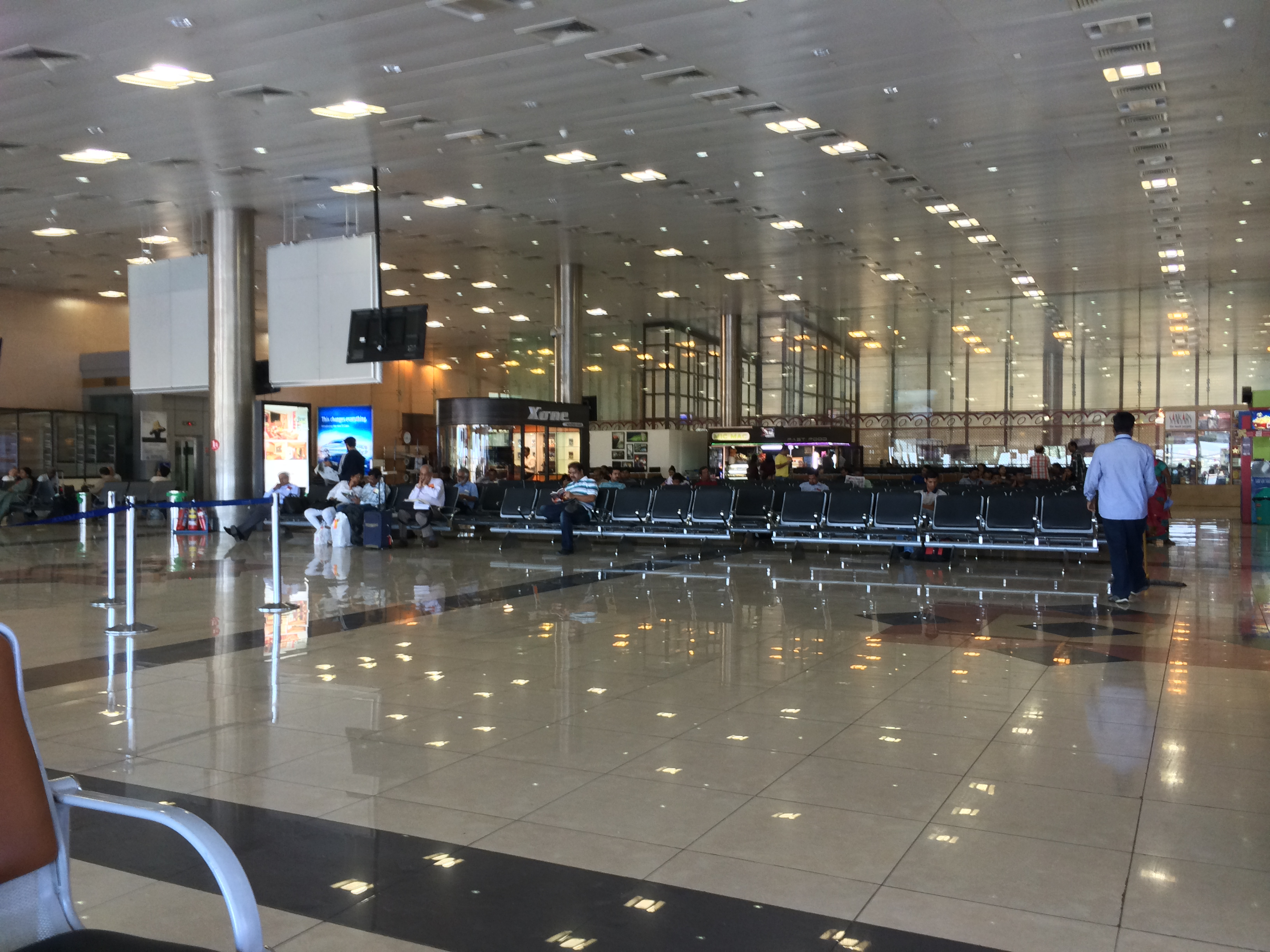
Departure lounge at Pune airport

Pune Airport is an international airport at Lohegaon, operated by the Airports Authority of India. It shares its runways with the neighbouring Indian Air Force base. In addition to domestic flights to all major Indian cities, this airport serves international direct flights to Dubai (operated by SpiceJet & IndiGo), Bangkok (operated by Air India Express & IndiGo) and Singapore (operated by Air India).

Chhatrapati Sambhaji Raje International Airport is a proposed greenfield international airport to serve the city of Pune, India. The airport will be located near the villages of Ambodi, Sonori, Kumbharvalan, Ekhatpur-Munjawadi, Khanwadi, Pargaon Memane, Rajewadi, Aamble, Tekwadi, Vanpuri, Udachiwadi, Singapur near Saswad and Jejuri in Purandar taluka of Pune District in the Indian state of Maharashtra.

== See also ==
- Public transport in Mumbai
