= Kiddle (surname) =

Kiddle is a surname of English origin. Notable people with that name include:

- Bob Kiddle (1869–1918), English amateur footballer
- Francis Kiddle (1942–2015), British philatelist
- Frederick B. Kiddle (1874–1951), English pianist, organist and accompanist
- Henry Kiddle (1824–1891), British-born United States educator and spiritualist
- Jackie Kiddle (born 1994), New Zealand rower
- John Kiddle (disambiguation), multiple people
- Margaret Loch Kiddle (1914–1958), Australian writer and historian

== See also ==
- Kittle (surname)
- Kiddle (search engine)
