= Kiddle =

Kiddle or kiddles may refer to the following:

- Kiddle (search engine), safe search engine for kids
- Kiddle (surname), a surname of English origin
- An old name for a fishing weir
- Liddle Kiddles, dolls originally produced by toymakers Mattel Inc. in 1965

== See also ==
- Kiddo (disambiguation)
- Kittle (disambiguation)
