= John Kiddle (cricketer) =

English cricketer and British Army officer

Personal information
- Full name: John Arthur Copleston Kiddle
- Born: 16 April 1885; Bombay, Bombay Presidency, British India
- Died: 4 June 1954 (aged 69); Stoke Mandeville, Buckinghamshire, England
- Batting: Unknown
- Bowling: Unknown

Domestic team information
- Years: Team
- 1905/06: Europeans

Career statistics
Competition	First-class
Matches	1
Runs scored	0
Batting average	0.00
100s/50s	–/–
Top score	0
Balls bowled	216
Wickets	4
Bowling average	24.25
5 wickets in innings	–
10 wickets in match	–
Best bowling	4/97
Catches/stumpings	–/–
- Source: ESPNcricinfo, 7 June 2022

John Arthur Copleston Kiddle MC (16 April 1885 — 4 June 1954) was an English first-class cricketer and British Army officer.

The son of J. C. Copleston, he was born at British India in Bombay in April 1885. He was educated in England at Dulwich College, where he played for the cricket eleven and the rugby fifteen. After leaving Dulwich in 1904, Kiddle returned to India, where in 1905 he played a first-class cricket match for the Europeans cricket team against the Parsees at Poona in the Bombay Presidency Match. He took the wickets of Jemi Modi, D. M. Raja, J. J. Dubash, and K. B. Mistry in the Parsees first innings for the cost of 97 runs. Kiddle served in the British Indian Army in the First World War, being commissioned into the Reserve of Officers as a second lieutenant in July 1915. He was attached to the 125th Napier's Rifles, where in May 1916 he was appointed a temporary captain while in command of a company. In June 1916, he was awarded the Military Cross for gallantry. Kiddle was promoted to lieutenant the in July 1917, antedated to July 1916; he relinquished this temporary appointment in May 1918. By July 1918, he was serving as a lieutenant in the 124th Baluchistan Infantry, being appointed a temporary captain while an adjutant. He resigned from the British Indian Army in May 1922, retaining the rank of captain.

Kiddle married Helen Bertha Fletcher in May 1925. He later retired to England, where he died at Stoke Mandeville in June 1954.
