= Swargate bus station =

Bus station in Pune, India

General information
- Location: Jedhe Chowk, Satara Road, Swargate, Pune
- Coordinates: 18°29′56.56″N 73°51′29.78″E
- System: Intercity and Intracity bus station
- Owner: Maharashtra State Road Transport Corporation, Pune Mahanagar Parivahan Mahamandal Limited
- Connections: Rainbow BRTS, Purple Line Swargate

Construction
- Structure type: At grade station
- Parking: Yes
- Cycle facilities: Yes
- Accessible: Yes
Location

Swargate bus station consists of two adjacent bus stations in Pune, operated by the Maharashtra State Road Transport Corporation (MSRTC) and the Pune Mahanagar Parivahan Mahamandal Limited (PMPML). It is located in the locality of Swargate in Pune, opposite the Swargate Police Station.

== MSRTC section ==
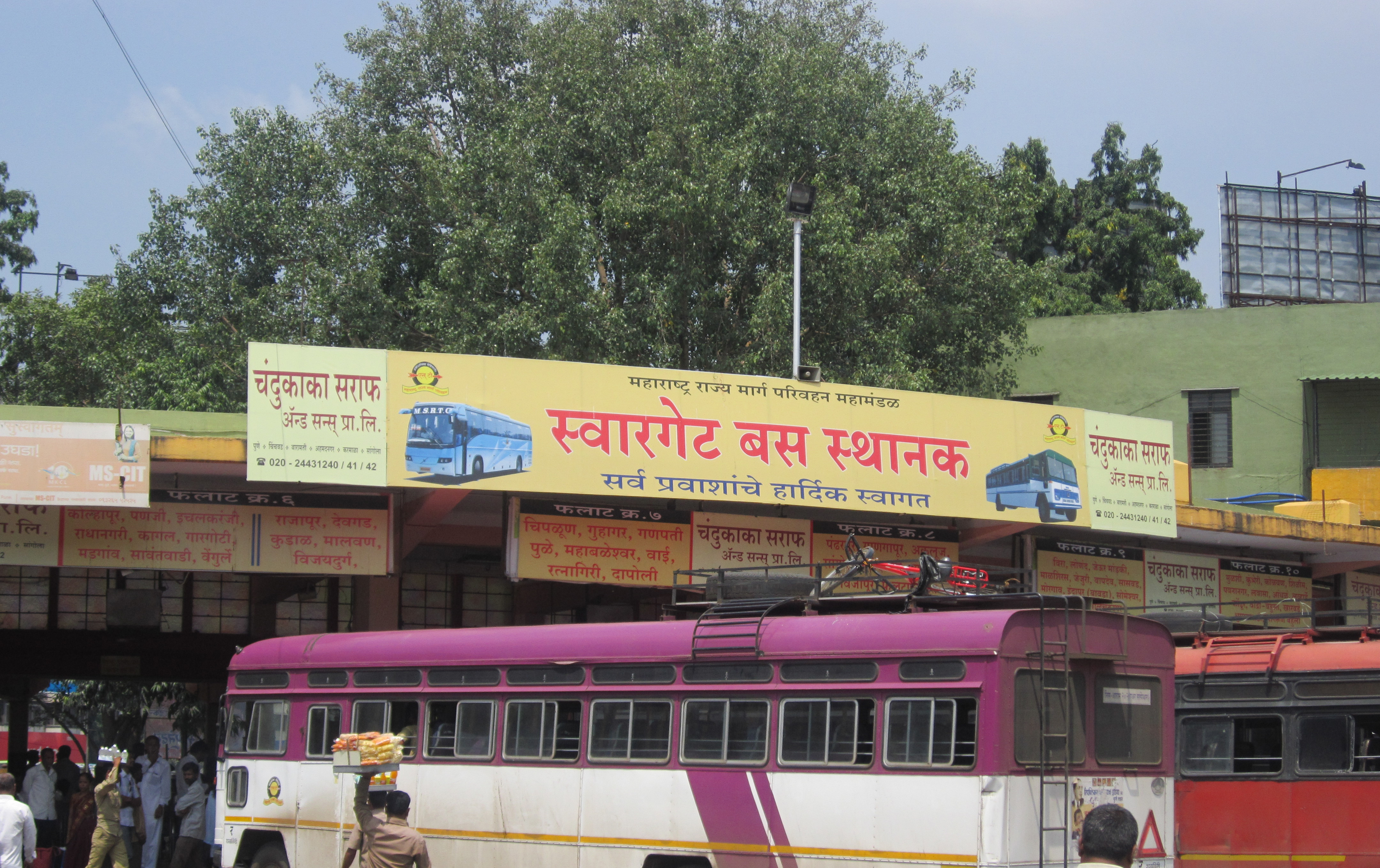
Swargate Bus stand (MSRTC section)

The Maharashtra State Road Transport Corporation operates a bus station a Swargate. Approximately 1800 buses are estimated to arrive and depart from the terminus. Buses of the Karnataka State Road Transport Corporation also pass through the bus station. In 2012, the traffic arm of the Pune Police proposed to split the bus station into different bus stations across the city to ease traffic congestion.

Buses bound for Satara, Karad, Belgaum, Kolhapur, Hubli, Ratnagiri, Chiplun, Miraj, Sangli, Mahabaleshwar, Bhor, Pandharpur, Tasgaon, Ichalkaranji, Gargoti, Gadhinglaj, Ajara, Shirala, Islampur, Vita, Jath, Wai, Mumbai, Thane, Palghar, Solapur, Barshi, Akkalkot, Baramati, Akluj, Kurduwadi, Mangalwedha, Sangola leave from the Swargate ST station. Both the MSRTC and KSRTC operate services to the neighbouring state capital of Bangalore from Swargate while the former operates some of its services to the state capital of Mumbai via Lonavala as well.

== PMPML section ==
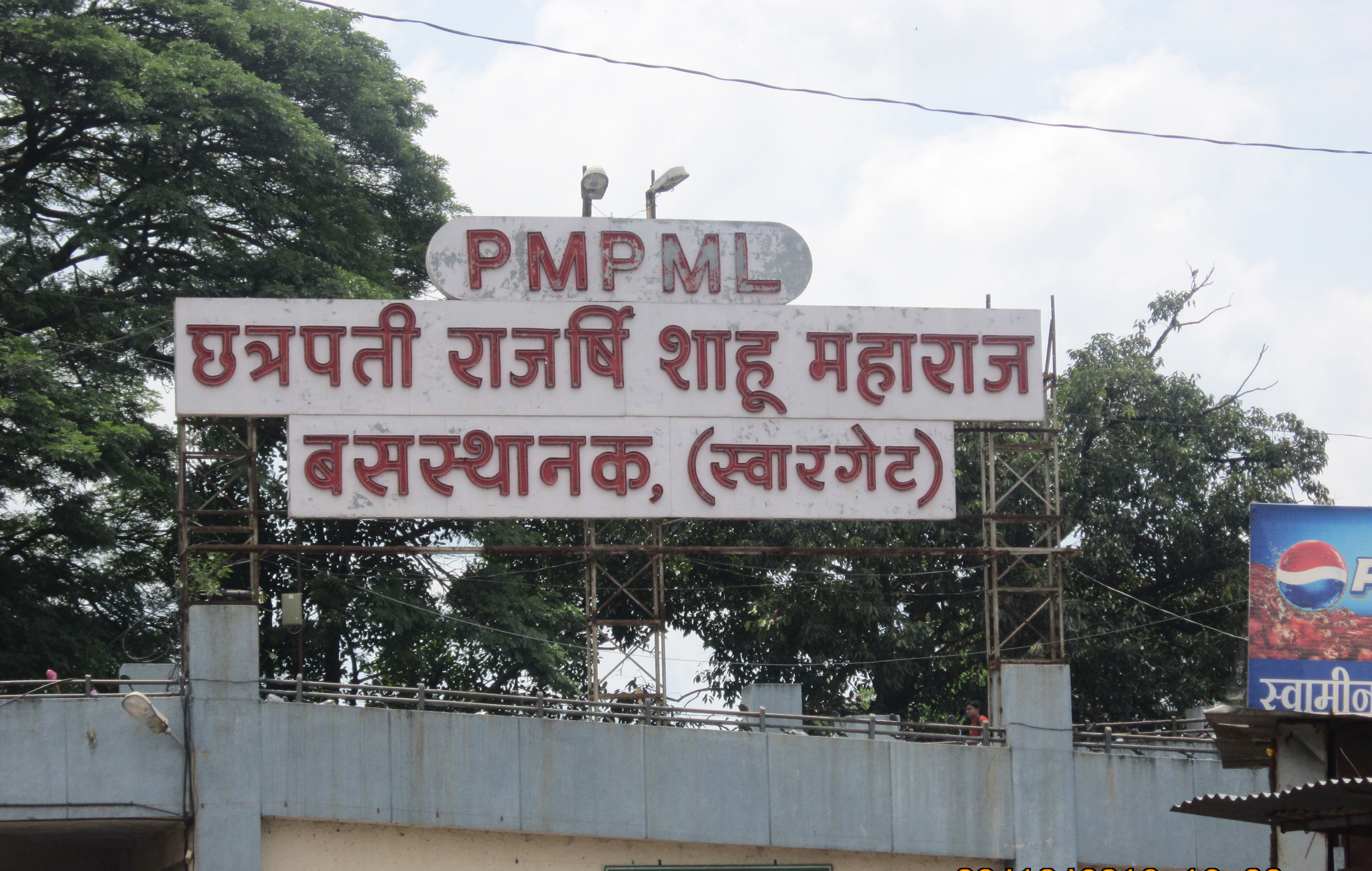
Swargate Bus stand (PMPML section)

The Pune Mahanagar Parivahan Mahamandal Limited (PMPML) has its headquarters at Swargate.

The PMPML section of the bus station is named Chattrapati Shahu Maharaj bus station. It is the common terminal point on the Hadapsar-Swargate and Katraj-Swargate sections of the Rainbow BRTS.

== Future ==
Swargate will have multimodal terminal with metro cum bus hub. It will have 10 platforms for buses with three platforms for metro.

== See also ==
- Maharashtra State Road Transport Corporation
- Pune Mahanagar Parivahan Mahamandal Limited
- Pune Station Bus Stand
- Shivajinagar Bus Stand
- Swargate
