= John Kiddle =

John Kiddle may refer to:

- John Kiddle (priest)
- John Kiddle (cricketer)
