= Pune Station Bus Stand =

Bus stand in Pune

Coordinates: 18.5280°N 73.8722°E

Pune Station Bus Stand is one of the three major bus stands in city of Pune. This stand is next to Pune Railway Station and so it is called Pune Station Bus Stand. This stand connects Pune to Mumbai (Dadar) by AC buses. This also connects Pune to Shirdi, Ahmednagar, Barshi, Thane, Mumbai (Borivali), Solapur, Kolhapur, Satara, Mahabaleshwar, Panvel etc. in Maharashtra. Buses traveling from Pune to outside states operate from this bus stand. This stand links Pune to Hyderabad in Telangana and Hubli in Karnataka which are outside Maharashtra. Buses to Konkan also operate from this stand. This stand has 8 platforms. Pune International Airport is around 10 km from Pune Station Bus Stand.

== See also ==
- Maharashtra State Road Transport Corporation.
- Swargate Bus Station
