= Swargate =

Swargate स्वारगेट
- Neighbourhood
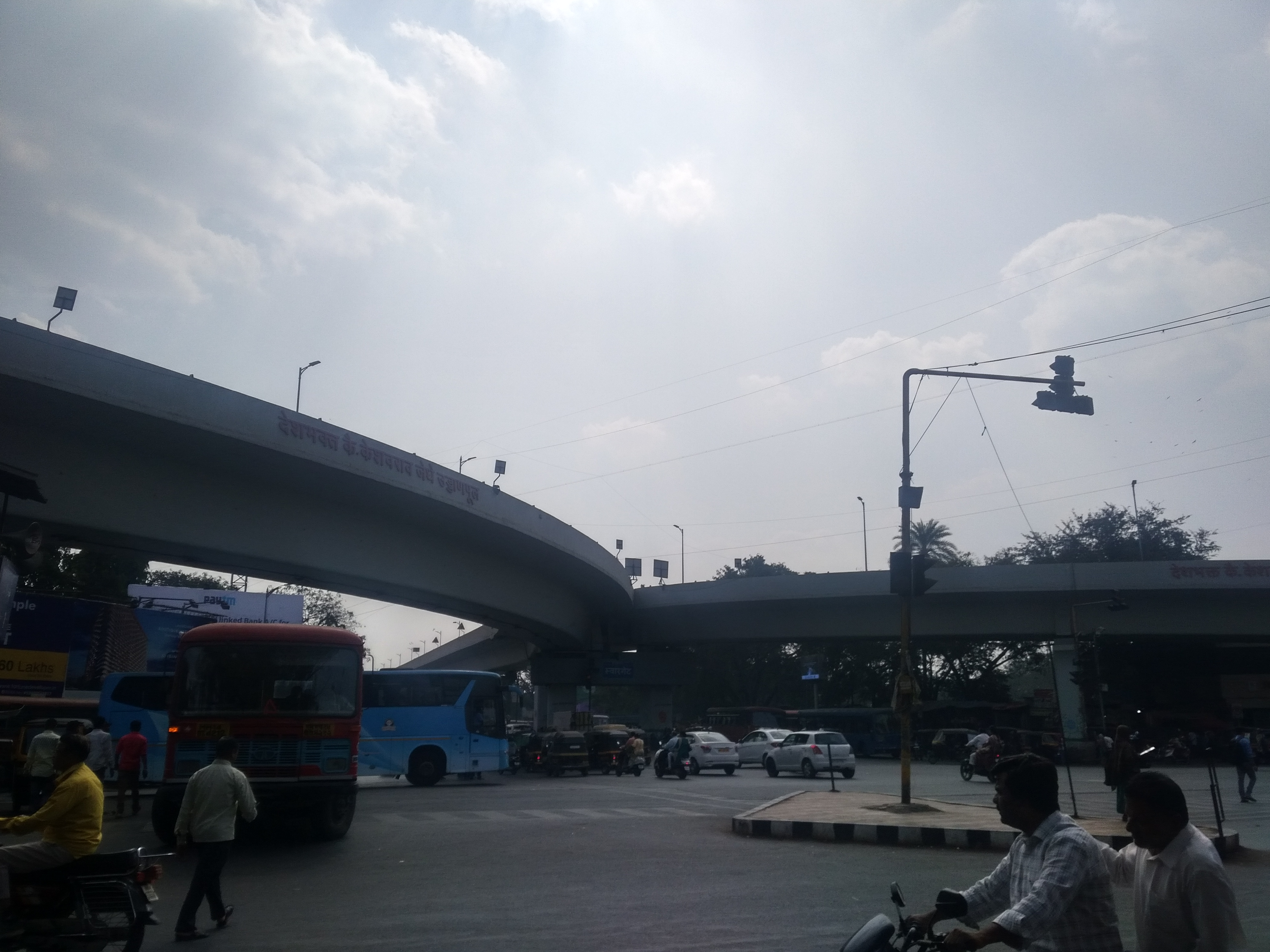
- Swargate Flyover
- Interactive map of Swargate
- Country: India
- State: Maharashtra
- District: Pune

Languages
  - Official: Marathi
- Time zone: UTC+5:30 (IST)
- Vehicle registration: MH-12
- Coastline: 0 kilometres (0 mi)

Swargate is an area of Pune, Maharashtra, India. This is one of the busiest areas in Pune. The Swargate connects Pune to various areas like Hadapsar, Fursungi, Dhankawadi, Bibwewadi, etc. The areas under Swargate include Guru Nanak Nagar, Mukund Nagar, and Municipal Colony. The old city of Pune ends here.

== Geography ==
Swargate has a Major bus stand for Pune. It serves as a BRTS terminal for the Katraj – Swargate, and Hadapsar – Swargate bus routes. It is a commercial area with important buildings like Income Tax office, PMC branch (Swargate), and other commercial buildings. Swargate will also serve as a major head for the Pune Metro project. It is well connected to the city and nearby villages by PMPML buses. Swargate also accommodates a large number of auto-rickshaws which ply their trade from the Swargate bus terminus. These auto-rickshaws provide an important cheap alternative transport to the residents of Pune. These three-wheeled transport alternatives are available in both prepaid and postpaid payment terms at the Swargate bus terminal.

== History and tourism ==
Swargate has a rich history dating back to the pre-independence era. The first bus service from Swargate was started in the year 1940. At that time, the Tongawalas or horse-drawn carriage owners opposed the move. In 1941, the first public bus rolled out of Swargate. There are many places for tourist places and entertainment places in the area of Swargate Those include Ganesh Kalakrida Mandir, Nehru Stadium, Saras Baug, Sanas Maidan, and Laxminarayan cinema hall, Parvati, Raja Kelkar Museum, etc. The famous Mahalaxmi temple of Pune is located near Sarasbaug near this area.

== Road connectivity ==
The Pune – Satara road originates from here. Shankar Sheth road which originates from this area serves as a link between Poolgate and Swargate. Tilak road links Swargate to Deccan Gymkhana while Shivajinagar is linked to Swagate by Shivaji road. Sinhagad road or Narvir Tanaji Malusure road originates from the southern side of Sarasbaug near the Swargate area. Jedhe square which is an important road junction marks the origin of five roads. The location of Swargate PMPML depot and MSRTC stand is in the Jedhe square.

== Nearby places ==
- Nehru Cricket Stadium
- Ganesh Kala Krida Manch
- Saras Baug
- Heera Baug
- Mahalaxmi Temple

== Swargate Bus Station ==
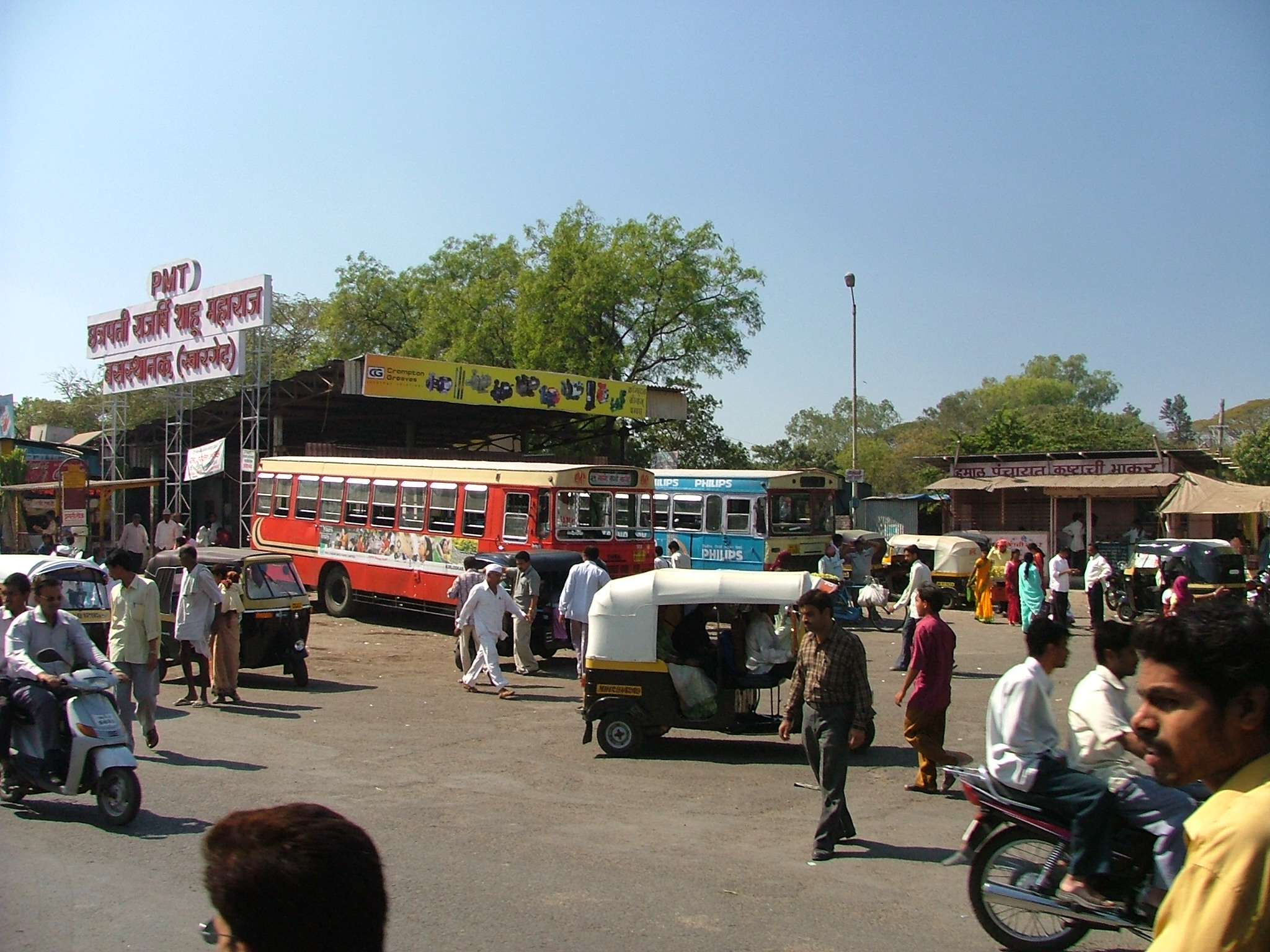
Swargate bus station, Pune

Swargate is one of the major hubs of the Maharashtra State Transport network. From here buses leave for Mumbai, Satara, Baramati, Kolhapur, Belgaum, and other places around Pune. Buses operate from 4 a.m. to midnight. Recently due to heavy traffic in the area, Pune municipal government has decided to make the major roads in this area one-way only. It is a very crowded place.

== See also ==
- Deccan Gymkhana
- Shivajinagar
- Pune Railway Station
- Pune
- Pune District
- Maharashtra
