= Kittles =

Kittles is a surname. Notable people with the surname include:

- Kerry Kittles (born 1974), American basketball player and coach
- Rick Kittles (born 1976), American biologist
- Tory Kittles (born 1975), American actor

== See also ==
- Kittle (surname)
