= Kiddo (disambiguation) =

Kiddo was a P-Funk group.

Kiddo may also refer to:

- Anna Chalon (born 1989), stage name Kiddo, French singer-songwriter
- Kiddo (stylized KIDDO), a Swedish singer-songwriter featured on "All We Got" (Robin Schulz song)
- Beatrix Kiddo, protagonist of the Kill Bill films
- Kiddo Davis (1902–1983), American baseball outfielder
- Kiddo (album), 2019 album by Tove Styrke
- Kiddo (film), 2023 Dutch film
- Kiddo, ship's cat of America (airship)

== See also ==
- Kiddle (disambiguation)
- Kid (disambiguation)
