= Deccan Gymkhana =

- Neighbourhood
- Nickname: Deccan
- Location in Maharashtra, India
- Coordinates: 18.5184°N 73.8406°E
- Country: India
- State: Maharashtra
- District: Pune
- Taluka: Pune City

Government
  - Body: Pune Municipal Corporation

Languages
- Time zone: UTC+5:30 (IST)
- PIN: 411004
- Telephone code: 020-
- Vehicle registration: MH-12
- Lok Sabha constituency: Pune
- Vidhan Sabha constituency: Shivajinagar, Pune
- Civic agency: Pune Municipal Corporation

Deccan Gymkhana is an area in Pune city named for the Deccan Gymkhana Sports Club, which lies in the centre of the city.

== See also ==
- Shivajinagar
- Gymkhana
- Swargate
- Pune Railway Station
- Pune
- Pune District
- Maharashtra
