= Deccan Gymkhana Ground =

Sports venue in Pune, India

- Gymkhana Ground
- Interactive map of Deccan Gymkhana Ground

Ground information
- Location: Pune, Maharashtra
- Country: India
- Coordinates: 18.5149°N 73.8411°E
- Establishment: 1908
- Capacity: 500
- Owner: Deccan Gymkhana

Team information
| Maharashtra | (1934–2002) |

Deccan Gymkhana Ground is a ground located in the Deccan Gymkhana area of Pune, Maharashtra. The Deccan Gymkhana and its grounds were founded in October 1906. The chief founder was Mr. Balkrishna Narayan (Bandopant) Bhajekar. The ground has a pavilion and can accommodate 500 persons. It has basketball and volleyball courts and a cricket ground along with one gymnasium hall. It also has facilities for swimming, table tennis, billiards, cards and 11 tennis courts. It has one main clubhouse.

This sports club has hosted Davis Cup matches. This was also the host of Maharashtra Premier League cricket matches. This club also host the NECC ITF International Women's Tournament 2011.
