= Kittle (surname) =

Kittle is a surname.

Notable people bearing it include:

- Hub Kittle (1917–2004), American baseball player and manager
- Ron Kittle (born 1958), American baseball player
- Katrina Kittle (fl. 2000s), American novelist
- George Kittle (born 1993), American football tight end

== See also ==
- Kittel (surname)
- Kittles
