= Maharashtra State Road Transport Corporation =

Indian public transport corporation

- Formerly: Bombay State Road Transport Corporation (BSRTC)
- Industry: Public transport bus service
- Founder: Government of Maharashtra
- Headquarters: MSRTC Building, Dr. Anandrao Nair Marg, Mumbai Central, Mumbai, 400 008
- Area served: Maharashtra, Telangana, Gujarat, Karnataka, Goa, Madhya Pradesh, Dadra and Nagar Haveli, Andhra Pradesh, Chhattisgarh
- Key people: Eknath Shinde (Deputy Chief Minister of State); Pratap Sarnaik (President); Madhav Kusekar (Vice President and Managing Director)
- Brands: Rajmata Jijau; Shivshahi; Night Express; Ordinary Express; Day Ordinary; AC-Shivneri; AC-Sheetal; AC-Ashwamedh; Volvo AC; Hirkani; Vithai; E-Shivai
- Services: Public transport; Tour and Travels; Urban Bus Transport
- Owner: Government of Maharashtra
- Website: Maharashtra State Road Transport Corporation and ST Mahamandal Portal

The Maharashtra State Road Transport Corporation (MSRTC) is the state-run bus service of Maharashtra, India, which serves routes to towns and cities within Maharashtra as well as to its adjoining states. It also offers a facility for online booking of tickets for all buses. Recently from 21 May 2020, the Corporation started goods transportation, private bus body building, and private vehicle tyre remoulding. In the future, the Corporation plans to start petrol pumps for private vehicles all over Maharashtra.

== History ==
The Maharashtra State Road Transport Corporation was established by the State Government of Maharashtra as per the provision in Section 3 of RTC Act 1950. The MSRTC operates its services by the approved scheme of road transport published vide Notification MVA 3173/30303-XIIA dated 29 November 1973 in the official gazette. The area covered by the scheme is the entire area of the state of Maharashtra. The undertaking is operating stage and contract carriage services in the entire area of the state of Maharashtra except S.T. undertaking defined under Section 68 A (b) of M. V. Act and other exceptions published in the scheme. The first bus was flagged off from Pune to Ahmednagar in 1948.

In the 1920s, various entrepreneurs started operations in the public transport sector. Till the Motor Vehicle Act came into being in 1939, there were no regulations monitoring their activities which resulted in arbitrary competition and unregulated fares. The implementation of the Act rectified matters to some extent. The individual operators were asked to form a union on defined routes in a particular area. This also proved to be beneficial for travellers as some sort of schedule set in; with a time table, designated pick-up points, conductors, and fixed ticket prices. This was the state of affairs till 1948, when the then Bombay State Government, with the late Morarji Desai as the home minister, started its own state road transport service, called State Transport Bombay. And, with this, the first blue and silver-topped bus took off from Pune to Ahmednagar.

There were 10 makes of buses in use then – Chevrolet, Ford Motor Company, Bedford Vehicles, Seddon Atkinson, Studebaker, Morris Commercial, Albion Motors, Ashok Leyland, Commer and Fiat. In the early 1950s, two luxury coaches were also introduced with Morris Commercial Chassis. These were called Neelkamal and Giriyarohini and used to ply on the Pune-Mahabaleshwar route. They had two by two seats, curtains, interior decoration, a clock, and green tinted windows.

In 1950, a Road Transport Corporation Act was passed by the Central Government which delegated powers to states to form their individual road transport corporations with the Central Government contributing one-third of the capital. The Bombay State Road Transport Corporation (BSRTC) thus came into being, later changing its name to MSRTC with the re-organization of the state.

The ST started with 30 Bedford buses having wooden bodies, coir seats. The fare charged on the Pune-Nagar route was nine paisa. With time, the S.T. buses underwent many changes, including increasing the seating capacity from the original 30 to 45 to the present 54, introduction of all-steel bodies to replace wooden bodies to make them stronger and cushion seats for more comfort. Later, in 1960, aluminium bodies were introduced as steel corrodes, especially in coastal areas, and the colour code also changed to red from the blue and silver. A partial night service was launched in 1968; the overnight service about a decade later and the semi-luxury class came into being during the 1982 Asian Games.

The S.T. buses are also used for transportation of the postal mail, distribution of medicines, newspapers and even tiffins sent by people from rural areas to their relatives in cities. They also are used to transport agricultural goods to cities.

== Fleet ==
Bus Type	No.of Bus
Ordinary Bus	13000
City Bus	100
Semi Luxury(Hirakani)	450
Midi Bus	30
Shivneri-Ashwamedh(volvo & Scania)	110
Shivshahi AC Seater	1070
Ordinary Sleeper Seater	200
Non AC Sleeper	100
Shivai Electric	50
Shivneri- Electric	30

MSRTC is operating a fleet of approximately 15,512 buses that ferry 8.7 million passengers daily. The Ordinary, Parivartan, Asiad and City Buses are built at MSRTC's in-house workshops in Pune, Aurangabad, and Nagpur on Ashok Leyland and TATA chassis. These workshops produce as many as 20,000 buses per year on average. The corporation has nine tyre retreading plants along with 32 divisional workshops. The Shivneri air-conditioned bus service's fleet consists of Volvo 9400R and Scania Metrolink buses. The Shivshahi buses are air-conditioned luxury buses which are operated by MSRTC and some private contractors.

In 2018, MSRTC added approximately 1,000 special non-AC Vithai buses, which were introduced to ferry passengers to the pilgrim town of Pandharpur in the Solapur district. They have a seating capacity of 45 seats and a similar design to that of 'Parivartan' buses.

In 2019, the MSRTC introduced new non-air-conditioned buses with beds and recliner chairs specially designed for long overnight routes. Extra facilities like reading lamp, night lamp, charging point, fan and two huge storage compartments have also been provided.

MSRTC’s first electric bus, Shivai, going from Pune to Ahmednagar was flagged from Pune in presence of the then Deputy Chief Minister Ajit Pawar and the then state Transport Minister Anil Parab on 1 June 2022. MSRTC would get 50 electric buses in July 2022 which will be deployed from Pune to four cities — Nashik, Solapur, Kolhapur and Sambhajinagar.

In 2024 MSRTC gave contract to Ashok Leyland for procurement of 2000 non A/c ordinary buses(Lalpari). MSRTC plans to induct 300 buses per month in the fleet from March 2025.

Passengers will be able to know the live location of ST buses through a new mobile app developed by ST Corporation

== Services ==
Service name	Gallery
Rajmata Jijau Bus	msrtc bus
Ashwamedh	Ashwamedh bus
Shivneri	SHIVNERI - AC RECLINER
E-Shivneri (Electric)	
Shiva-E (Electric)	
Shivshahi AC	
Non AC Sleeper Seater	
Hirkani ( asiad or semi luxury)	
City Bus	
Shital Bus	
Ordinary Express ( Vithai or MS Bus )	
Ordinary ( school bus or Lalpari bus)	REGULAR PARIVARTAN BUS LALPARI
Midi Bus ( Yashwanti or Bhimashankar bus )	

== List of bus depots, bus stands & traffic control cells ==
-Divisions-
Mumbai	Pune	Nashik	Ch. Sambhajinagar	Amaravati	Nagpur
Mumbai	Pune	Nashik	Ch. Sambhajinagar	Amaravati	Nagpur
Palghar	Kolhapur	Jalgaon	Beed	Akola	Bhandara
Thane	Sangli	Dhule	Nanded	Buldhana	Chandrapur
Raigad	Satara	Ahilyanagar	Parbhani	Yavatmal	Wardha
Ratnagiri	Solapur		Jalna		Gondia
Sindhudurg			Dharashiv		Gadchiroli
			Latur		

== NathJal ==
On Monday, November 2, 2020, MSRTC launched 'NathJal' with a focus to provide low-cost and pure potable water to the commuters. The bottled water will be available at the bus stations for INR 10 and 15, and a private company based out of Pune has been selected for bottled water supply. The new initiative was inaugurated by Transport Minister and President of ST Corporation Adv. Anil Parab.

The corporation plans to sell the drinking water at every bus stand of the corporation. Talking about the same, he said, "The bottled water of other companies cannot be sold on ST stands. The MSRTC has taken the responsibility of making quality water available to the passengers at affordable rates." Over the decades, Maharashtra has seen a great tradition of Warkari sector, whereby the Guru is called 'Nath'. Sharing more, Minister Parab said that the official bottled drinking water being named NathJal is a moment of honour for Maharashtra.

Which aims to increase its revenue.

== 2021–22 strike ==
During the COVID-19 lockdown in India which started in March 2020, MSTRC was unable to process salaries of employees for many months. Salaries of nearly 90,000 employees were held up for 3–4 months, leading to few employees committing suicides finding it difficult to meet their needs. Employees put in various demands in front of the then Maharashtra government; like pay hike, remunerations for losses and also to consider the merger of MSRTC with the state government by which benefits of the state government would get extended to the MSRTC employees. With failure to reach any conclusion on demands; over 92,600 MSRTC employees went on strike from 27 October 2021.

== Gallery ==
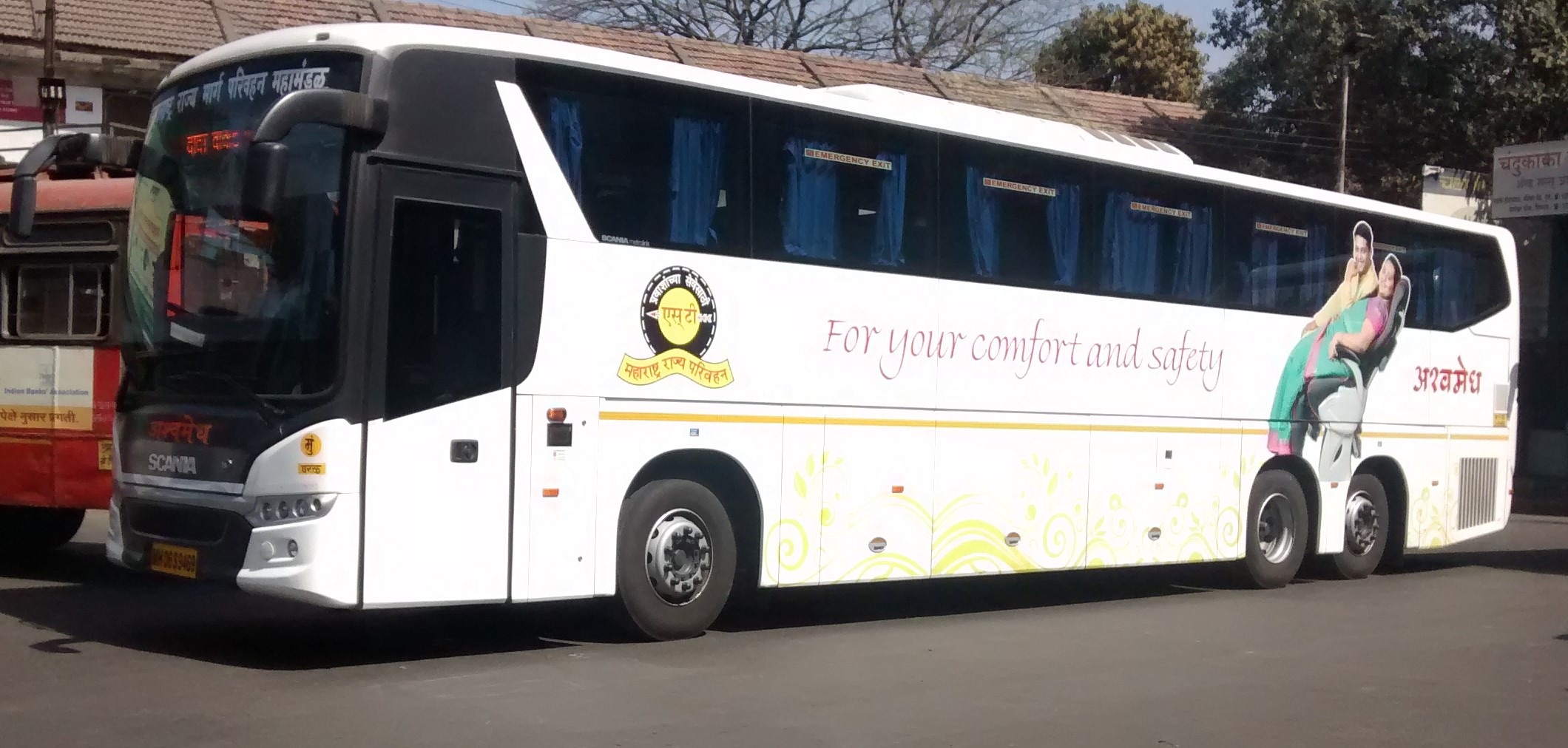
Ashwamedh - AC Recliner

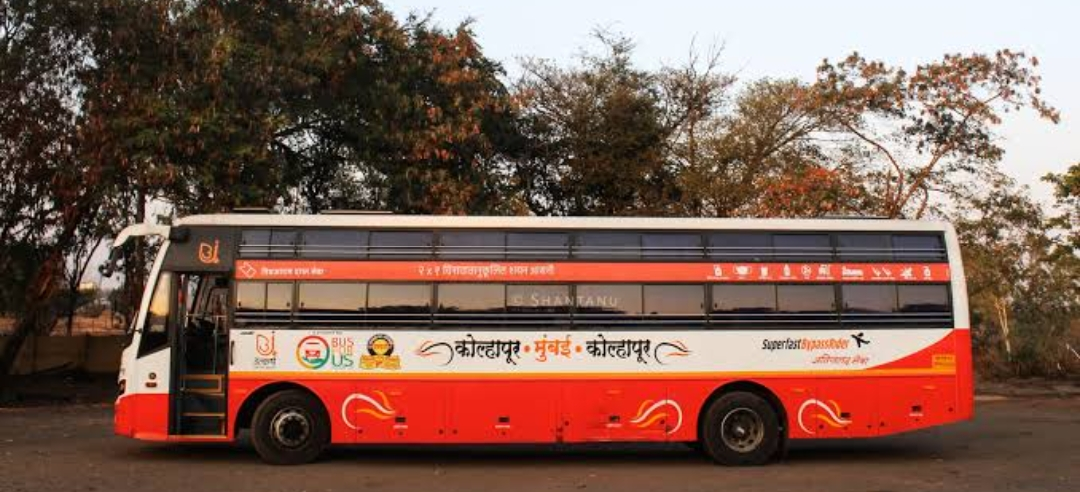
A Mumbai-Kolhapur semi-luxury sleeper bus
