= Blue Ridge Town Pune =

Township in Maharashtra, India

Coordinates: 18.5777045°N 73.7342787°E

Blue Ridge is a township built under the new Township Act by Paranjape Schemes. Such townships are also known as Integrated Townships. It is located in Hinjawadi in Pimpri Chinchwad, Maharashtra, India. The township area is approximately 138 acres and was designed to be a self sufficient town with various amenities available inside the town. Citizens started occupying the houses since 2010, and continues to develop itself with newer mid- and high-rise residential towers.

== History ==
Before Blue Ridge was developed, the area was mostly farmland belonging to farmers of Hinjawadi and Maan villages. The Hinjawadi IT Park a.k.a. Rajiv Gandhi IT Park is located nearby. Paranjape Developers purchased the land for the purpose of building Blue Ridge under the new Township Act.

== Overview ==
The Maharashtra government came up with a new township act to encourage developers to build new townships and related infrastructures like roads, water, sewage, etc.

=== Geography ===
Blue Ridge is located along Mula River. It is located in west side of Pune city but officially outside the city limits. Nearby villages are Hinjawadi, Maan, Mahalunge, Marunji.

=== Architecture ===
The township consists of 25 residential towers with 1-5 BHK flats, and office buildings. It also has a mini golf course and river side lawn.

== Education ==
Blue Ridge Public School is located inside the town. It provides primary and secondary education using ICSE curriculum i.e. The Council for the Indian School Certificate Examinations (CICSE) board commonly known as ICSE.

== Transport ==
Private vehicles is the main mode of transport to travel to Pune and Pimpri Chinchwad. Companies located here typically provide bus service for their employees connecting to various parts of Pune and Pimpri-Chinchwad.

== Controversy ==
As of 2017, there is controversy about official status of the town for governance purpose. Does it belong to nearby Hinjawadi village or is it independent town with separate governing body that officially represents state government. This resulted into a legal case between Paranjape Schemes who currently maintains the township and Hinjawadi Grampanchayat who would like to collect property tax.
