= Hinjawadi =

- Neighbourhood
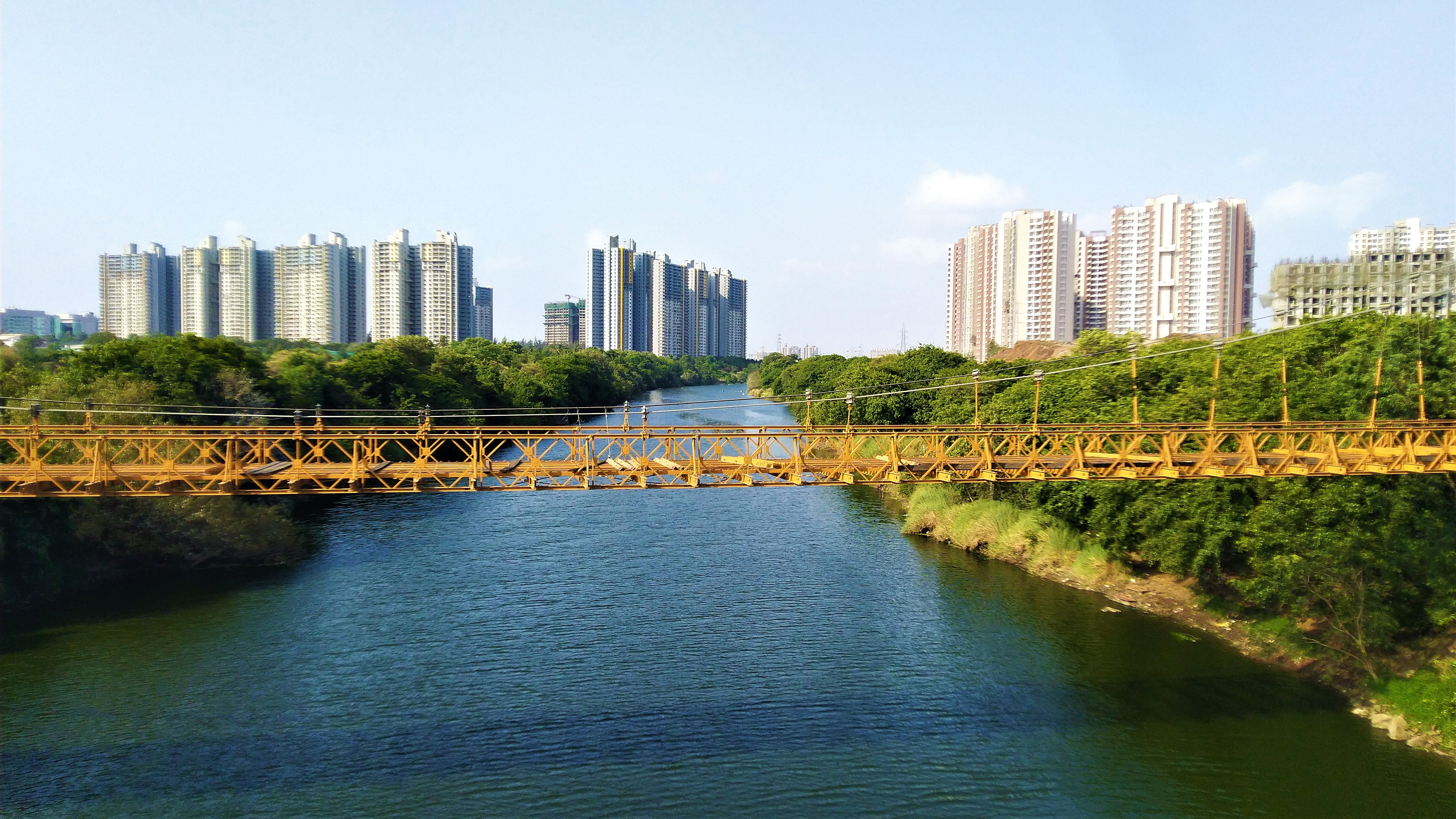
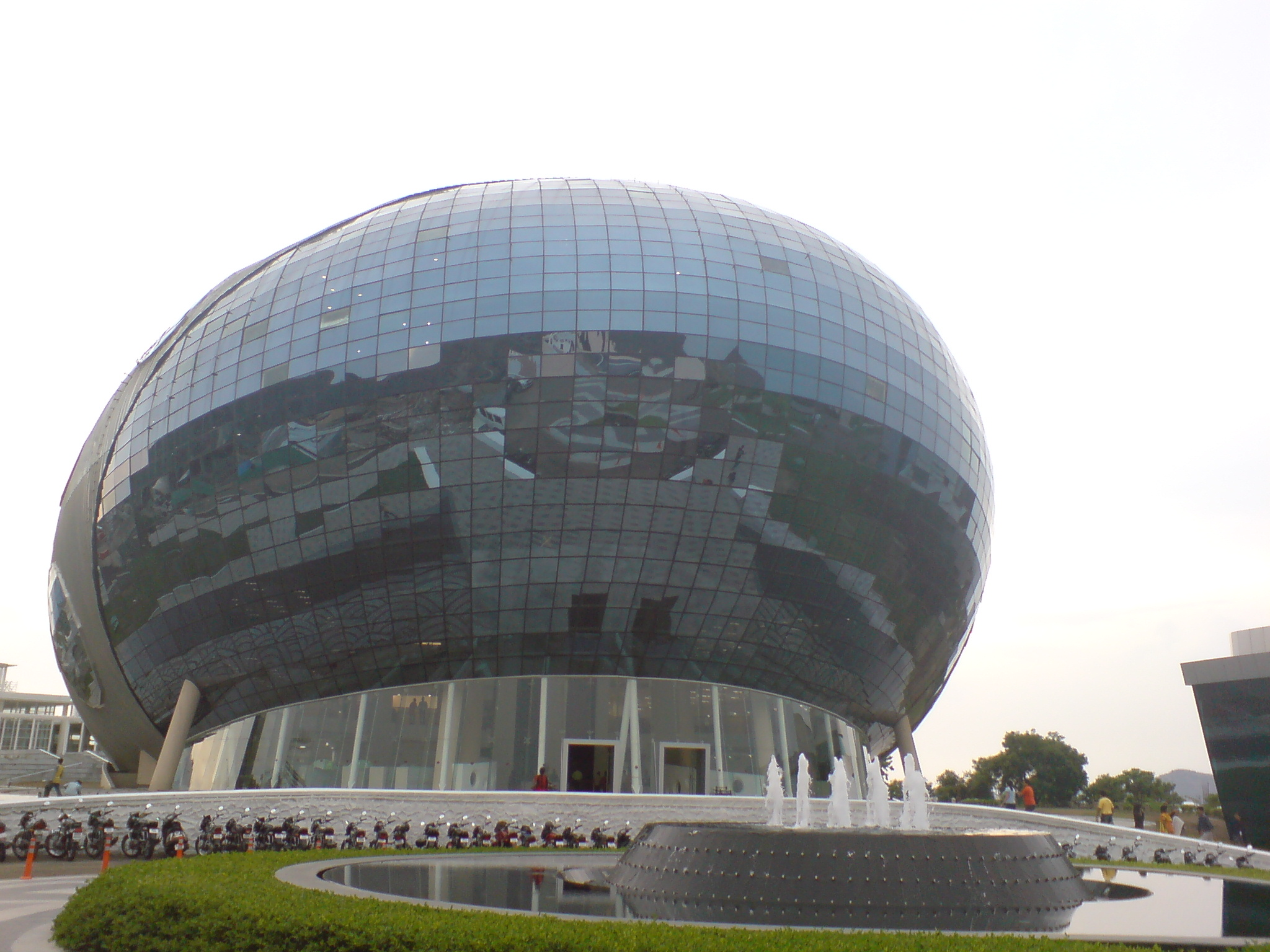
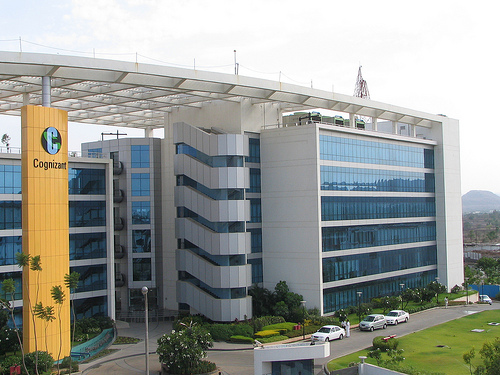
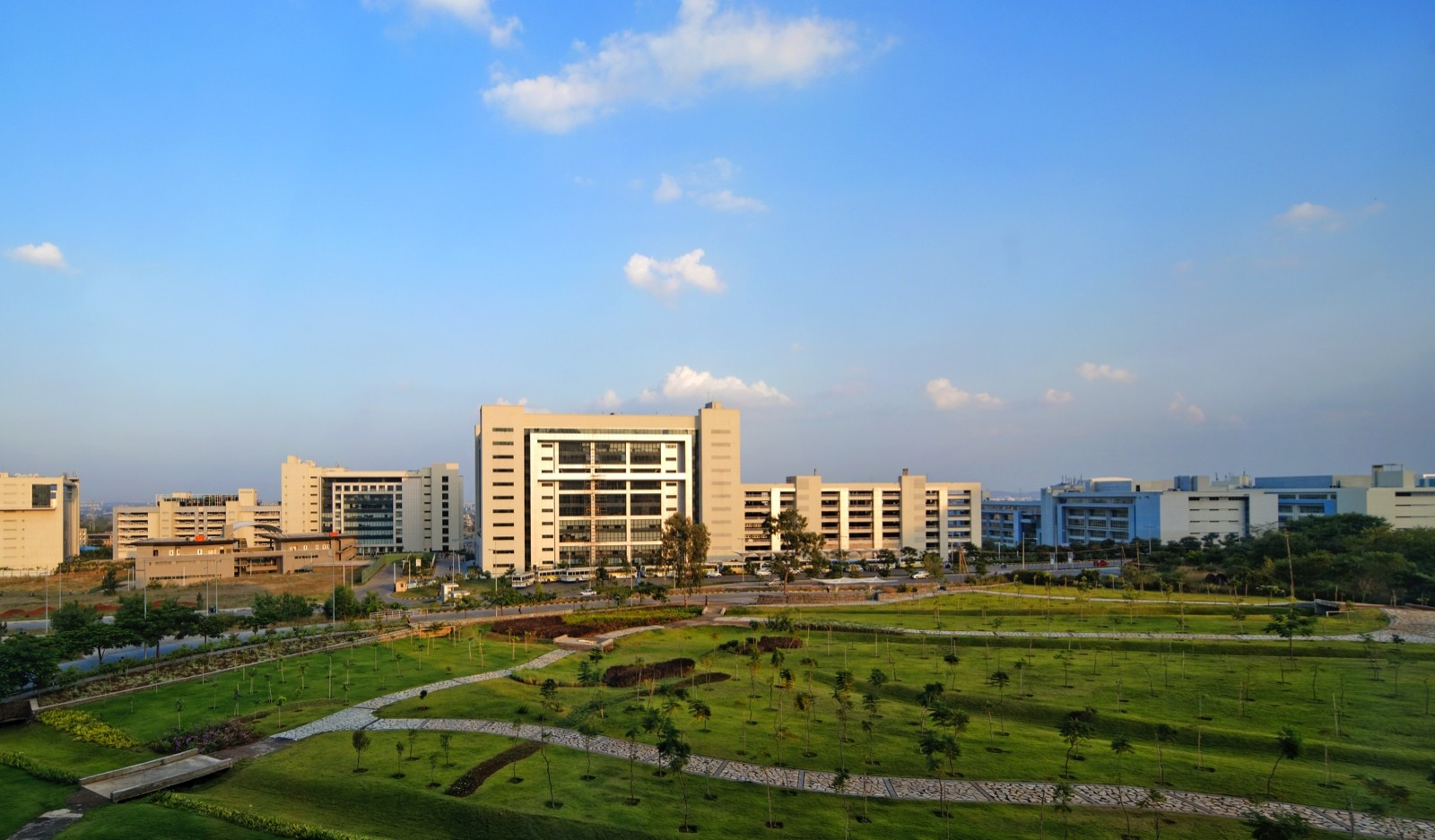
- (From top; L–R) Hinjawadi skyline, Infosys campus, Cognizant delivery center, Embassy Tech Zone
- Interactive map of Hinjawadi
- Location in Maharashtra, India
- Coordinates: 18.594596°N 73.718519°E
- Country: India
- State: Maharashtra
- City: Pune

Government
  - Body: Pune Metropolitan Region Development Authority

Languages
  - Official: Marathi
- Time zone: UTC+5:30 (IST)
- PIN: 411057
- Telephone code: 91-(0)-20
- Vehicle registration: MH 14, MH 12
- Website: https://pmc.gov.in/mr

Hinjawadi (also incorrectly spelt Hinjewadi and Henjewadi) is a suburb in Pune, India. It houses the Rajiv Gandhi Infotech Park, a large tech and business park spread over 2,800 acres, which was built by the Maharashtra Industrial Development Corporation. The business park has offices of over 800 companies.

== Transport ==
=== Road transport ===
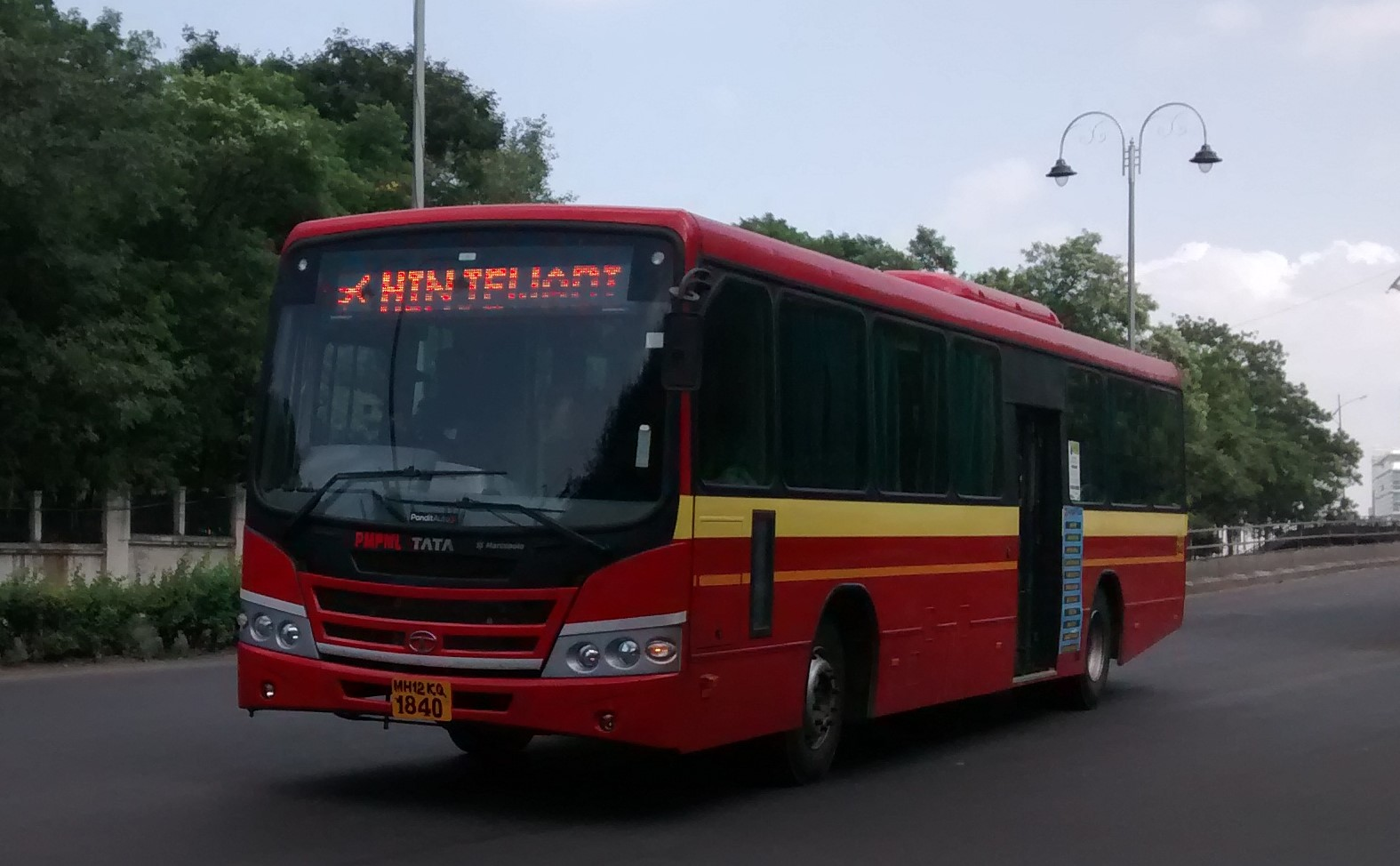
PMPML airport bus

Given to rapid development, Hinjawadi is prone to severe traffic congestion during the peak hours i.e. 8.00 AM to 12:00 PM and 5.30 PM to 8.00 PM. Accordingly, the HMVs (Heavy Motor Vehicles) are barred from entering Hinjawadi during these hours. The area sees a commute of roughly over 240,000 employees on a daily basis to and from the IT park.

=== Bus ===
PMPML also operates night buses after midnight on 7 routes. PMPML also runs special services for tourists under the name 'Pune Darshan' as well as airport services from Rajiv Gandhi IT Park, Hinjawadi to Pune Airport. PMPML goes to various areas of Pune such as Katraj, Baner, Kothrud, Manapa Bhavan, Pune Station, Hadapsar, Thergaon, Marunji, Chandkhed, Khamboli,Ghotawade Phata, Bhosari, Alandi, Nigdi, Chinchwad, Kharadi, Yerwada, Akurdi, Chikhali, Pimple Gurav and Kiwale.

=== Metro ===
Pink Line of the Pune Metro is the third line of the city's under-construction mass transit network. It will run from Civil Court, Pune to Megapolis Pune in Hinjawadi. The 23.3 km (14.5 mi) line will be completely elevated and will have 23 stations and will align with the Maharashtra Metro Rail Corporation Limited (Maha Metro) lines at the Civil Court interchange station. Depot will be located at Maan village. It will be spread across 20 hectares (49 acres). The line was opened on 4 November.

== Major companies ==
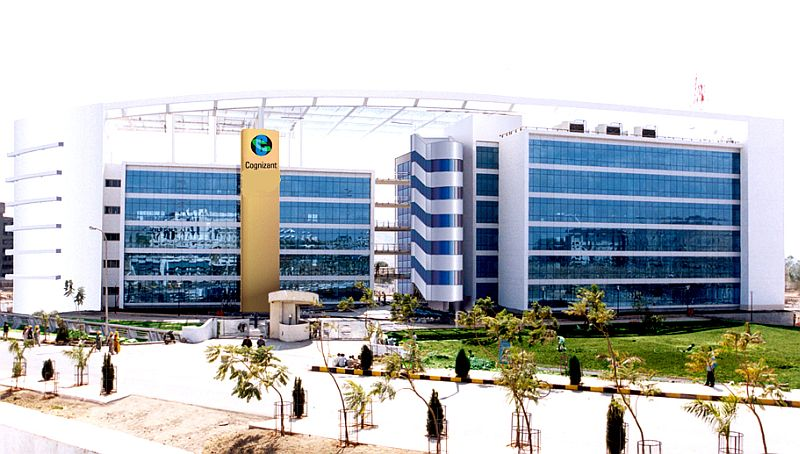
Cognizant in Phase-1

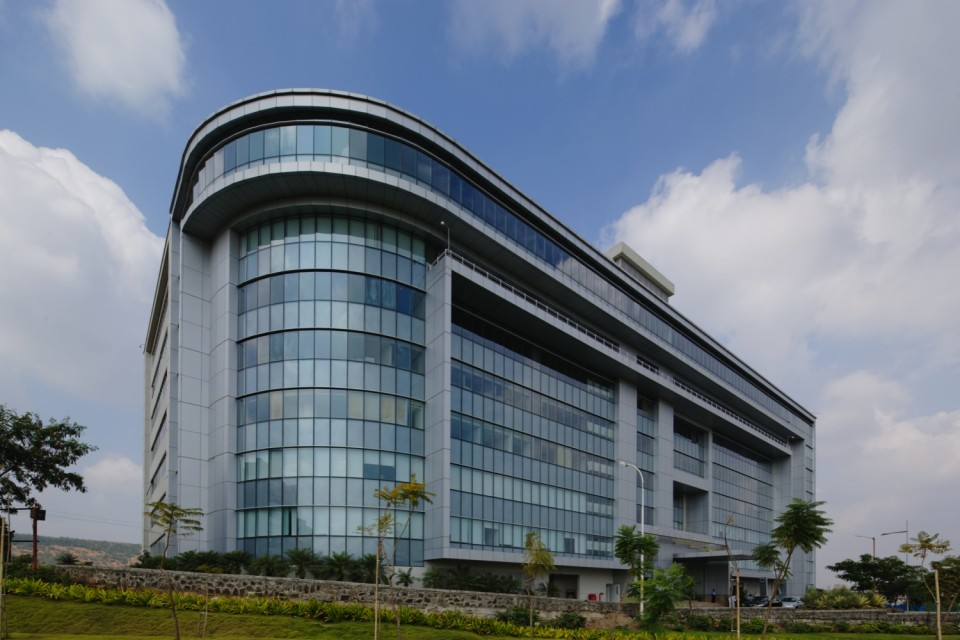
Embassy Tech Zone

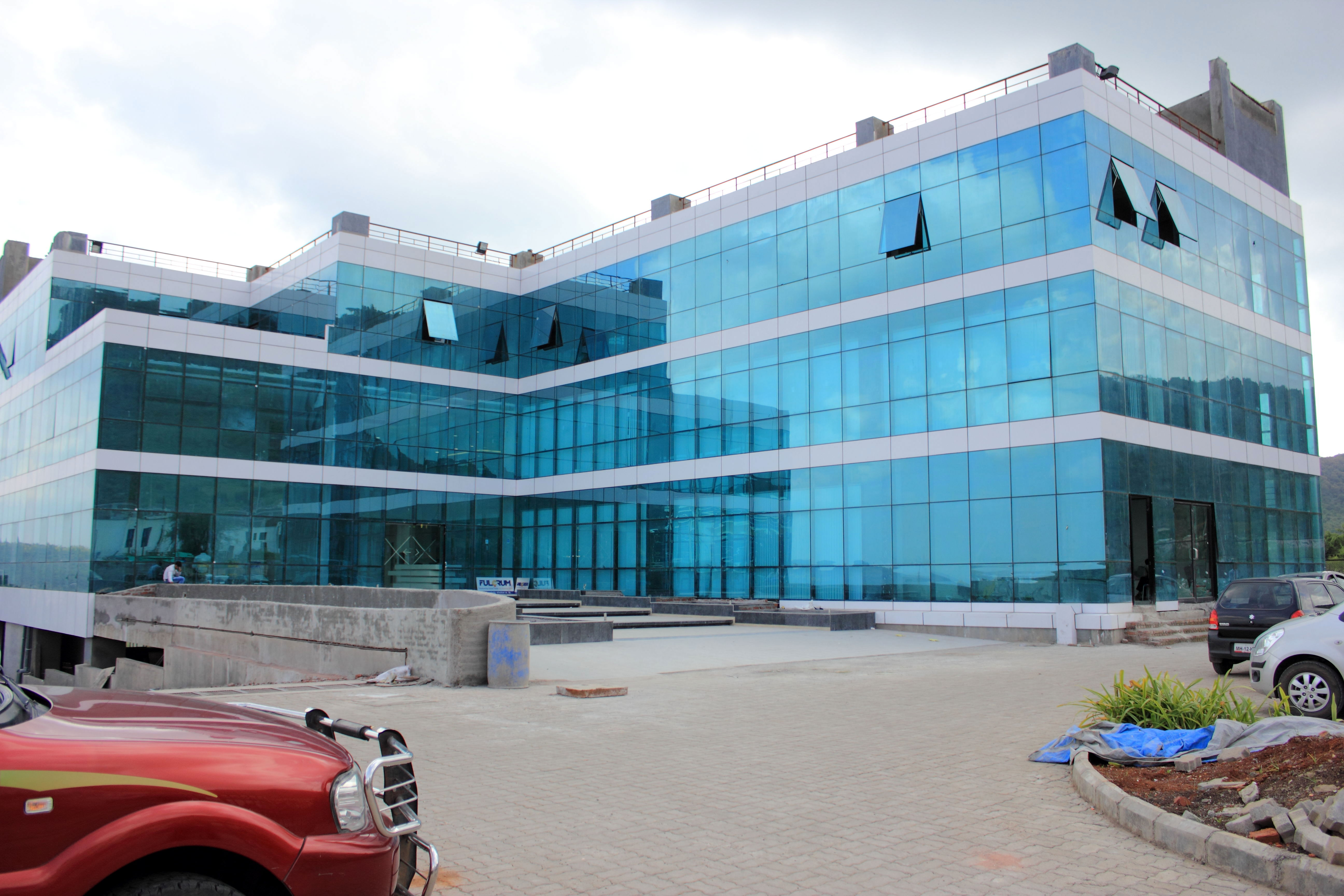
Fulcrum Worldwide software delivery centre

Major Companies in Phase-1
Companies	Type
Accenture	Software
Adient	Manufacturing
Aker Solutions	Software
Ansys	Software
Atlas Copco	Manufacturing
Behr	Manufacturing
Borosil Technologies	Manufacturing
CitiusTech	Healthcare
Cognizant	Software
Dassault Systèmes	Software
Dynamisch	Software
Ensono	Software
Eaton Corporation	Manufacturing
Harman International	Software
HCLTech	Software
Konecranes	Manufacturing
Keshri EduTech	Software
KPMG	Software
Labcorp	Healthcare
LTIMindtree	Software
NCSI Technologies	Software
Pall Corporation	Manufacturing
Saama Technologies	Software
Searce	Software
SPX Corporation	Manufacturing
Tata BlueScope Steel	Manufacturing
Tata Technologies	Software
Veepee	E-Commerce
Victaulic	Manufacturing

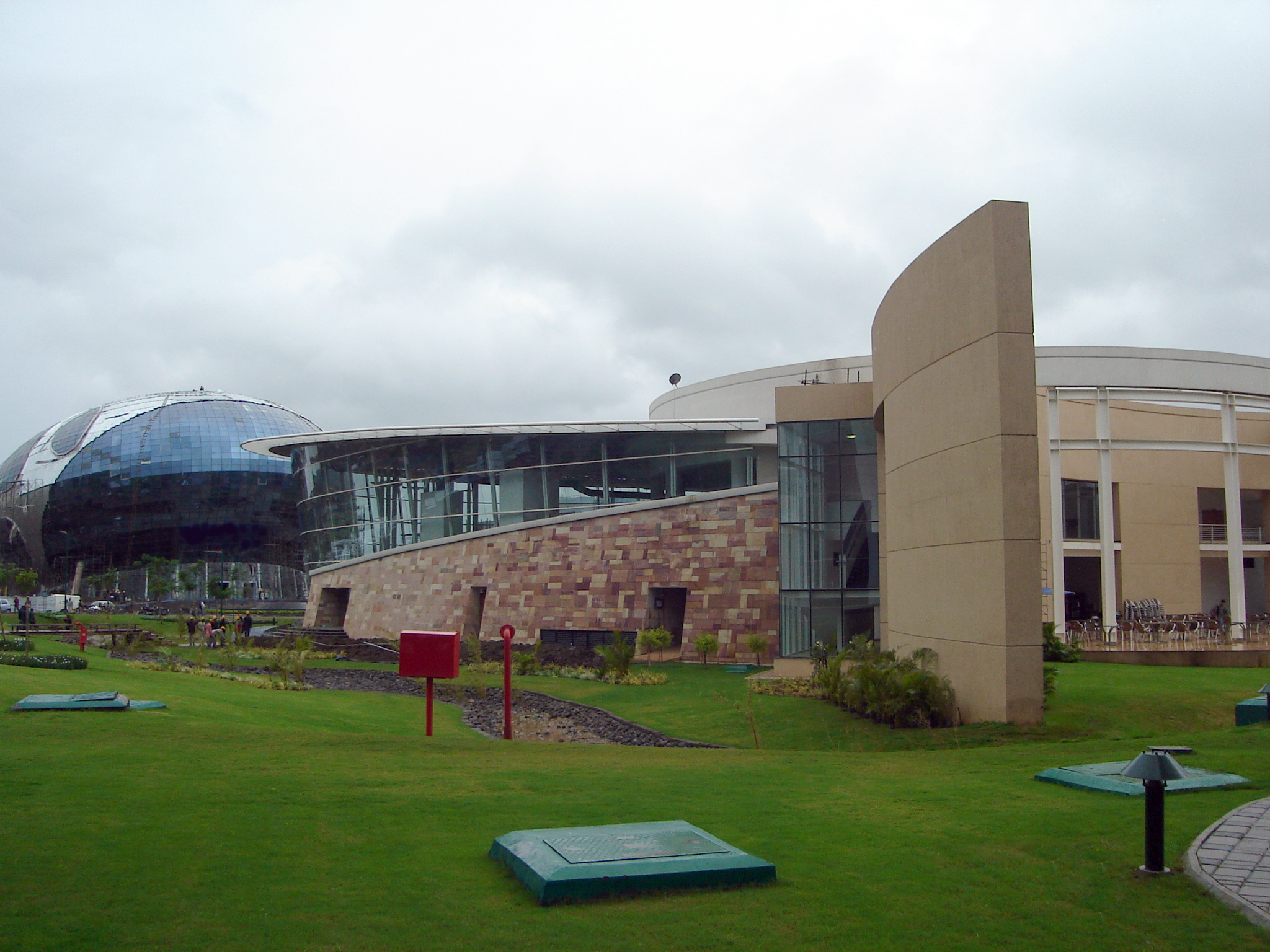
Infosys in Phase-2

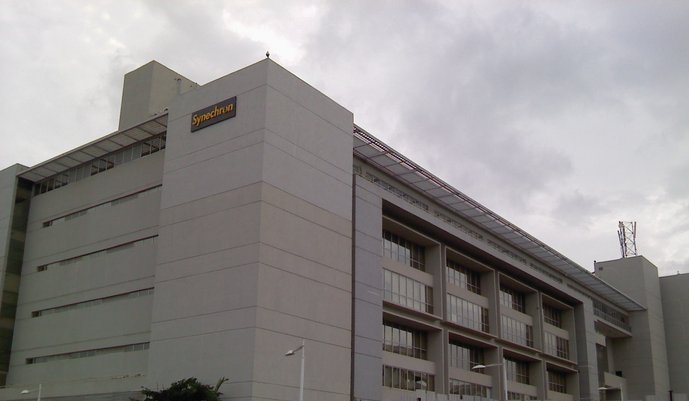
Synechron

Major Companies in Phase-2
Companies	Type
Cytiva	Healthcare
Döhler	Manufacturing
eClerx	Software
Emerson Electric	Manufacturing
Emcure Pharmaceuticals	Pharma
Flex	Manufacturing
IBM	Software
Infosys	Software
Honeywell	Manufacturing
Knorr-Bremse	Manufacturing
Mewoc Technologies	Software
Rockwell Automation	Manufacturing
Trumpf	Manufacturing
Telstra	Software
Volkswagen (VWITS)	Software
Wipro	Software

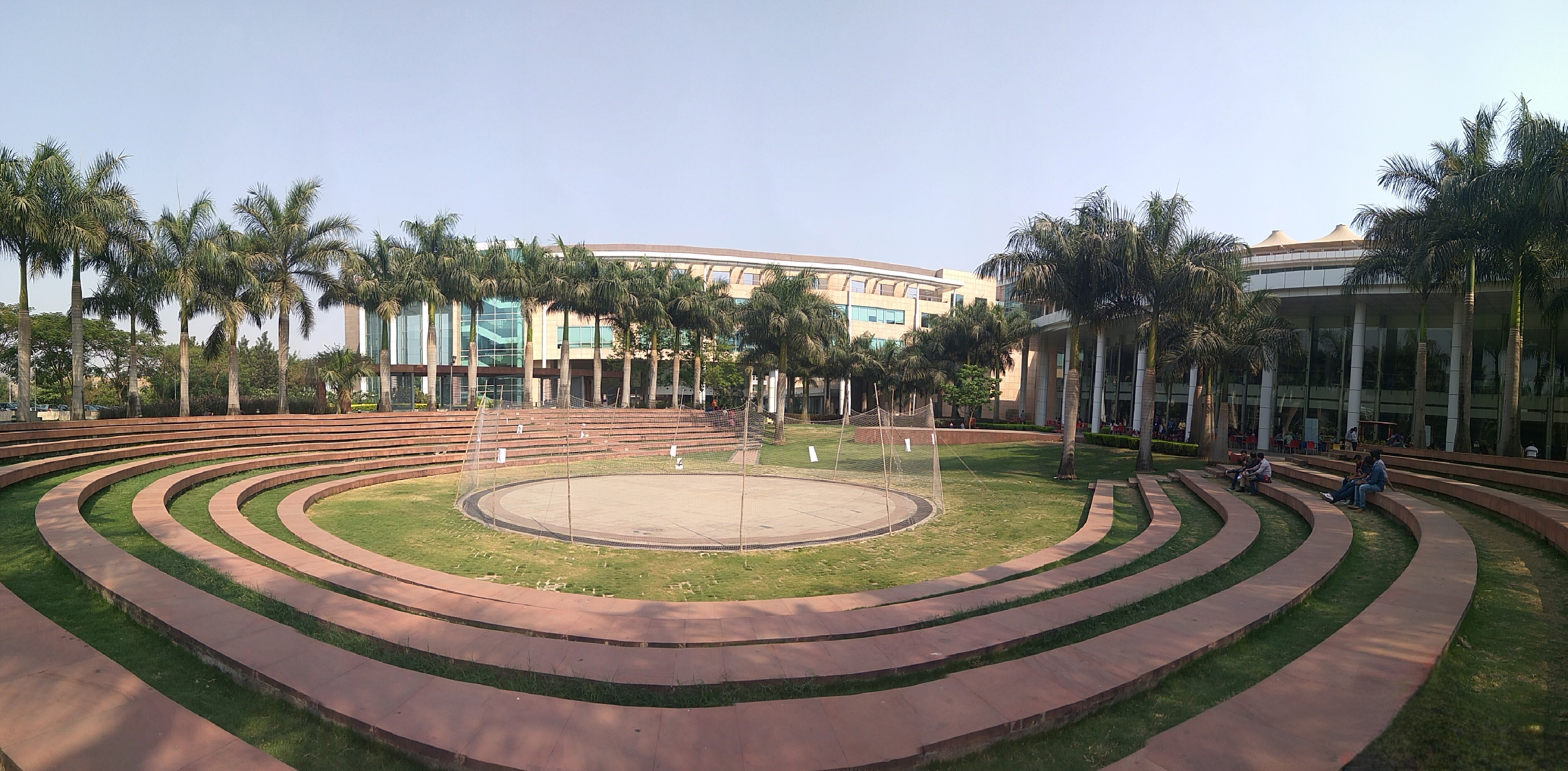
Tech Mahindra campus in Phase-3

Major Companies in Phase-3
Companies	Type
Capgemini	Software
KPIT Technologies	Software
Marquardt Group	Manufacturing
Synechron	Software
Tata Consultancy Services	Software
Tech Mahindra	Software
Neilsoft Limited	Engineering & Technology Services & Solutions

== See also ==
- Magarpatta
- Kharadi
- Aundh
- Talawade
- Shivajinagar
- Kalyani Nagar
- Viman Nagar
