= Jnana Prabodhini =

Social organization in Pune, India

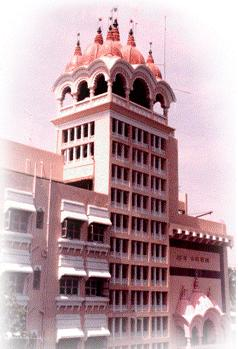
- Jnana Prabodhini, Pune
- Formation: 1962; 64 years ago
- Founder: Dr. V. V. Pendse
- Founded at: Pune
- Type: Non-governmental organization
- Headquarters: 510, Sadashiv Peth, Pune
- Website: www.jnanaprabodhini.org

Jnana Prabodhini is a social organization in India. Founded in 1962, its activities have expanded into multiple aspects of social work. The main activity of the organization is to provide education. It aims at refining the physical, mental, intellectual, and spiritual qualities of people in general and of the youth in particular, believing that this development will encourage positive social leadership qualities. Its activities are centered in the fields of education, research, rural development, health, and youth organisation.

The organization is headquartered in Pune, Maharashtra, formed around a cluster of public charitable trusts. It is active in most districts of Maharashtra, with facilities in Pune, Nigdi, Salumbre, Solapur, Harali, and Ambajogai. It does some work in parts of Jammu and Kashmir and the northeastern states of India. The organization has started a school in Nigdi, Solapur and Sadashiv Peth, Pune.

== Foundation and activities ==
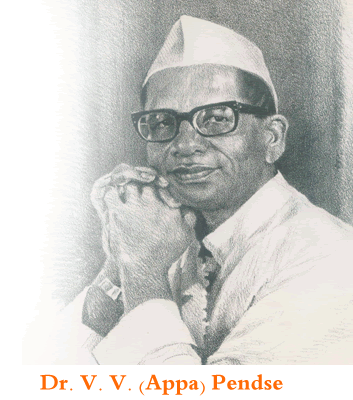
Dr. V. V. (Appa) Pendse, the founder of Jnana Prabodhini

Jnana Prabodhini was founded by psychologist, educator and social organizer Shri V. V. Pendse, who was inspired by Swami Vivekananda to create an organization that would change the nation through "man-making education". This is an extension of the Hindu concept of "Dharm-Sansthapana" – a belief in cycles of societal resurgence and reconstruction propelled by ancient heroes and saints. This belief was advocated by Samarth Ramdas in the 17th century, and by Maharshi Dayanand, Swami Vivekananda, and Yogi Arvinda. Having studied leadership styles, Pendse believed that a congenial atmosphere for education would inspire even-mindedness, and that intelligence was present among all social castes. The organization sought to identify intelligence at an impressionable age, and initially conducted enrichment programs at the high school level.

== Facilities ==
Jnana Prabodhini is headquartered in Pune, Maharashtra, India, and is most active in that state. It operates centres at Nigdi, Solapur and Harali, and has about ten smaller facilities in the state. The organization has informal work groups in most districts of Maharashtra, and also has a presence in the neighbouring states of Gujarat, Madhya Pradesh, Chhattisgarh and Karnataka, and also in Arunachal Pradesh and in Jammu and Kashmir.

=== Main centers ===
The Nigdi Center (Navnagar Vidyalaya) is located in the Pimpri-Chinchwad industrial area. It is a Marathi and English medium school with enrolment for 2,500 students from pre-primary level to class 10 level. It runs two education experiments: the Gurukul project, which seeks to develop the panchkoshas (five sheaths of personality) and the Kreedakul sports academy. The center also has a hall for cultural programs, a music school and a gymnasium.

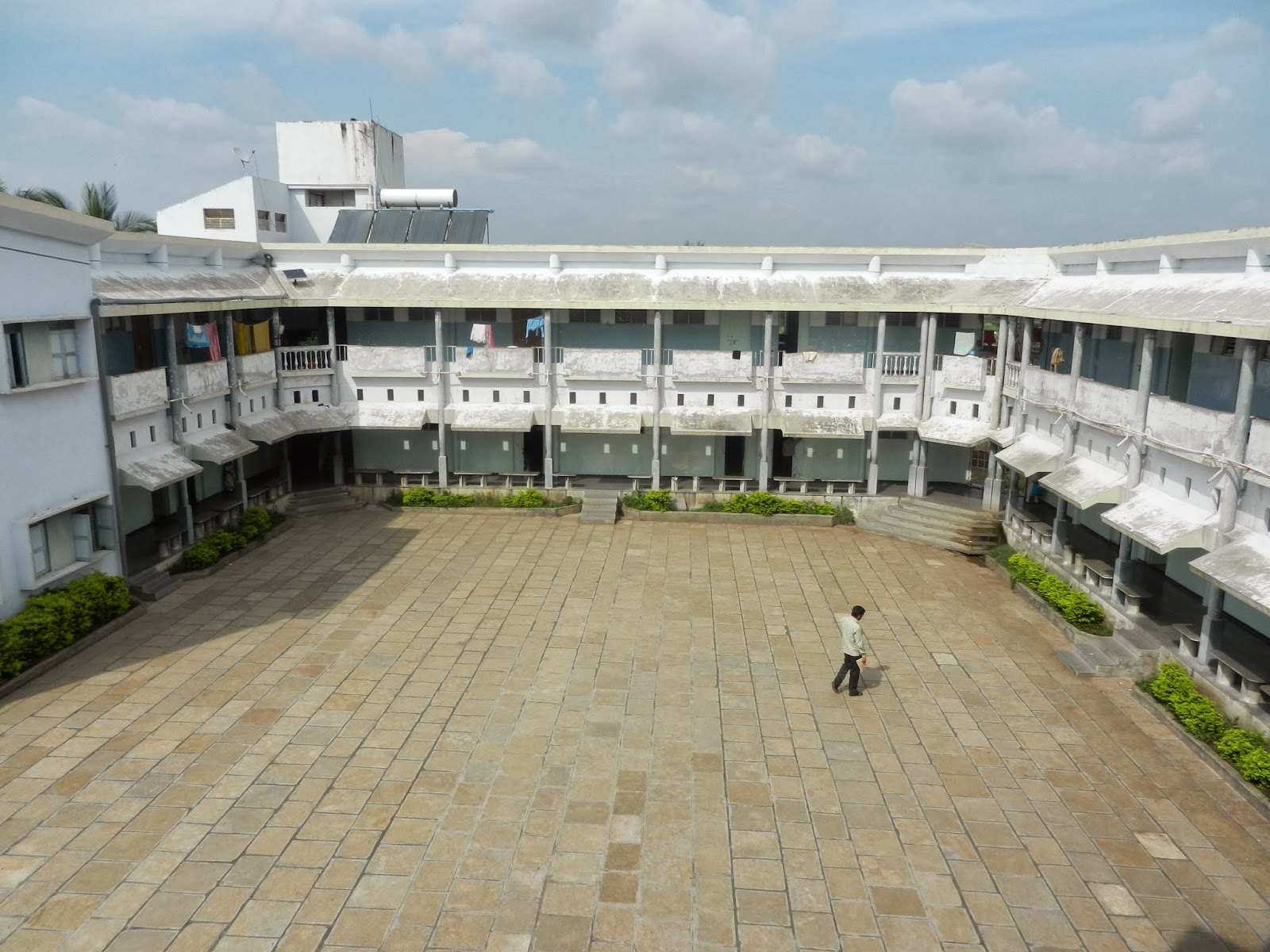
Jnana Prabodhini Harali (Residential School)

=== Jnana Prabodhini's Institute of Psychology ===
Jnana Prabodhini's Institute of Psychology Pune was established in 1985 and got affiliated to the University of Pune in 1993. It works in the areas of application of psychology in education, Counselling, HR interventions, conducting academic courses, workshops & trainings, and counselling and guidance programs to students.

=== Jnana Prabodhini Skill Development Center ===
Jnana Prabodhini Skill Development Center in Pune runs a number of vocational courses to enable individuals upskill themselves and help them get employed.

=== Priest trainings ===
Jnana Prabodhini's Sanskrit Sanskruti Sangshodhika department trains men and women for priesthood, regardless of gender or caste, which is rare in a profession traditionally dominated by male Brahmins. The department was established in 1975 and is one of the few formal institutes which also trains women. If has also published a set of 20 books of scriptures for rituals including naming ceremony, weddings, poojas and Śrāddha. In addition to Sanskrit mantras, the books also contain meanings of the mantras in English, Hindi and Marathi, for ease of understanding of participants.

== Notable alumni ==
- Manoj Mukund Naravane, former Chief of Army Staff, Indian Army
- Avinash Dharmadhikari, former IAS officer and social activist
