= Megapolis Pune =

Residential township in Pimpri-Chinchwad, India

Megapolis is an residential township in Pune, India. It is located in Hinjawadi. The township is being built at an estimated cost of ₹3,000 crore (US$350 million). It is developed by Pegasus Properties, a joint venture of Kumar Properties and Avinash Bhosale Infrastructure Ltd (ABIL). Work on the project started in early 2007, it was launched in April 2012, and possession of various building and housing projects started in 2013. Some new building clusters are launched in 2018 and 2019.

== History ==
This township was formally launched in April 2008, developed by Pegasus Properties Ltd., a joint venture between Kumar Properties and Avinash Bhosale Industries Ltd. (ABIL), established in 2008.

This was the third integrated township developed around the city of pune, after Amanora Park Town by City Development Corporation and Blue Ridge by Paranjape Schemes Construction, and has a projection of 10,000 apartments

== Overview ==
Megapolis township is being built over 150-acres and is slated to have around 10,000 residences. It is one among a number of other townships being developed in Hinjewadi by renowned developers in Pune. All these townships were conceived so that the rising number of computer software professionals working in the IT Park nearby would not have to commute for long distances. Megapolis is also located amidst IT majors like Tata Consultancy Services (TCS), Tech Mahindra, Cognizant, Siemens, IBM, Infosys, WIPRO, Synechron and others.

== Transport ==
Megapolis has easy access to Phase 3 of the IT Park, as well as Pirangut, Talegaon MIDC and Mumbai Pune Expressway. Most of the professionals working here get a pick up and drop service by their employers. For the others, the daily commute involves using their own vehicles or using public transport, which is basically the buses run by Pune Municipal Corporation. These Pune Municipal Transport buses are convenient and can be boarded from 2-3 spots - Shivajinagar and Pune Municipal Corporation bus stand. These buses ply till Phase III via Phase I of the IT Park. Additionally, there are auto rickshaws and even shared six seater from Chandni Chowk to Wakad Chowk, from where the commuters can get another one which takes them to the IT Park and Megapolis. Travelling by own car makes the commute even more easy.

== Education ==
Pawar Public School, a CBSE school is located within the township. The Pawar Public School is looked after by Pawar Public Charitable Trust. In addition, the trust also supports and sponsors programs for educational institutions like the Rayat Shikshan Sanstha, fostering the unique concept of 'earn & learn'. Pawar Public School, Hinjawadi, Pune, is the 5th school of the Trust after its branch in Chandivili, Mumbai. The school functions from Nursery to Grade X for the academic year 2022-23. The Trust started its flagship ICSE school at Bhandup, Mumbai in 2006. Pawar Public School, Hadapsar, Pune, started in March 2008, Pawar Public School, Kandivli West, Mumbai in March 2010 followed by a school in Chandivili, Mumbai.

== Salient Features ==
The township sports a range of amenities including basic utilities. There are multiple clubhouses, gymnasiums and amphitheatres as well. For any medical emergency, there is a clinic in the premises. There is a dedicated bus shuttle exclusively for the township along with the PMPML (Pune Municipal Corporation) bus service that runs throughout Hinjawadi. This is a common feature of some other townships in Pune as well. A number of swimming pools are also a part of the amenities. Enveloping all these is the latest security technology involving Intelligence surveillance system and 24x7 security.

== Mahesh Bhupathi Tennis Academy ==
Mahesh Bhupathi Tennis Academy launched its 38th Academy in India. The centre started tennis coaching from 15 October 2013.

Tennis clinics and other events are conducted on a regular basis. This facility is exclusively for Megapolis residents.

== Pre-School & Day Care Centre ==
At Megapolis, toddlers and young children can be taken care of at many parts of the township.

== Residences ==
More than 18,000 people reside currently in Megapolis and around 4.700 apartments have been sold so far. Township includes: Sangria Towers, Smart Homes I Sparklet, Smart Homes II Sunway, Smart Homes III Splendour, Mystic and Smart Homes IV Symphony. The project also provides connectivity to Mumbai – Bangalore expressway, Chakan, Talegaon and Mumbai-Pune Expressway.
