= Chinchwadi =

Village in Maharashtra

- Village
- Interactive map of Chinchwadi
- Country: India
- State: Maharashtra

Chinchwadi is a small village in Ratnagiri district, Maharashtra state in Western India. The 2011 Census of India recorded a total of 623 residents in the village. Chinchwadi's geographical area is approximately 423 hectares (1,050 acres).

== See also ==
- Chinchwad
