= Tata Steel =

Indian multinational steel company

Tata Steel Limited
- Formerly: Tata Iron and Steel Company Limited
- Type: Public
- Traded as: BSE: 500470; NSE: TATASTEEL; BSE SENSEX constituent; NSE NIFTY 50 constituent
- ISIN: INE081A01020
- Industry: Steel; Iron
- Founded: 26 August 1907; 119 years ago at Jamshedpur, Bihar (now in Jharkhand), India
- Founders: Jamsetji Tata; Dorabji Tata
- Headquarters: Mumbai, Maharashtra, India; 18.9316°N 72.8327°E
- Area served: Worldwide
- Key people: T. V. Narendran (MD & CEO)
- Products: Steel; Long steel products Structural steel Wire products Steel casing pipes Household goods
- Revenue: ▲₹232,140 crore (US$25 billion) (2026)
- Operating income: ▲₹34,848 crore (US$3.7 billion) (2026)
- Net income: ▲₹10,886 crore (US$1.2 billion) (2026)
- Total assets: ▼₹272,747 crore (US$29 billion) (2026)
- Total equity: ▲₹93,420 crore (US$10 billion) (2026)
- Number of employees: 75,260 (2026)
- Parent: Tata Group
- Subsidiaries: Tata Steel UK; Tata Steel Netherlands; Tata Steel Thailand; Jamshedpur FC; Tata Robins Fraser Ltd.
- Website: www.tatasteel.com

Tata Steel Limited is an Indian multinational steel company headquartered in Mumbai and is part of the Tata Group. Formerly known as Tata Iron and Steel Company Limited (TISCO), the company was established on 26 August 1907 in Jamshedpur.

Tata Steel ranked 8th globally in crude steel production in 2024, having an estimated annual capacity of 35 million tonnes and an output of 31.02 million tonnes. With domestic crude steel production of 21.6 million tonnes, it is one of India's largest steel producers.

As of 2024, Tata Steel employed approximately 78,300 people worldwide and operated in 26 countries, including key operations in India, the Netherlands, and the United Kingdom.

== History ==
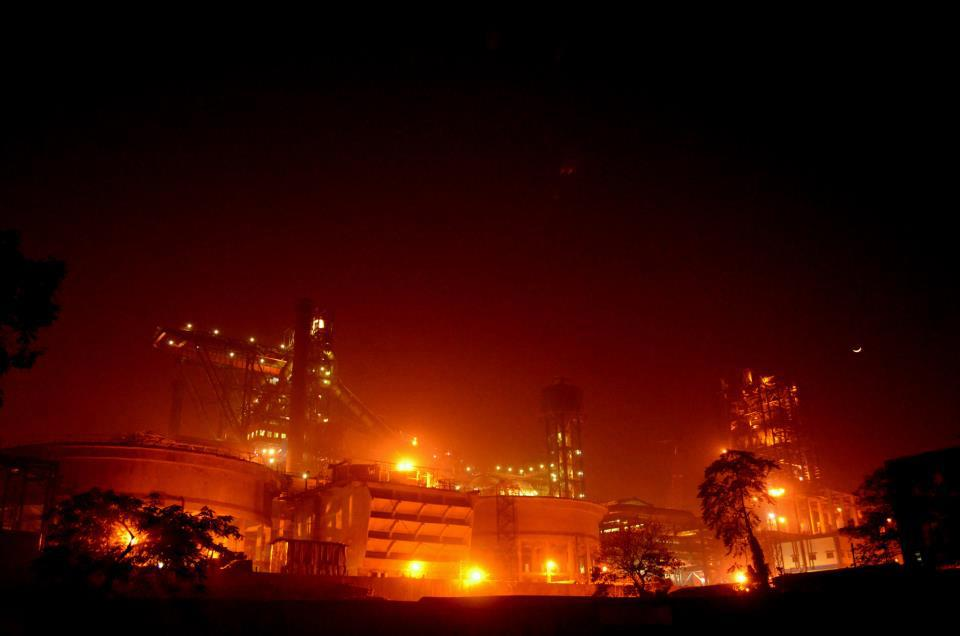
Tata Steel's Jamshedpur plant at night

Tata Iron and Steel Company (TISCO) was founded by Jamsetji Nusserwanji Tata and established by Sir Dorabji Tata on 26 August 1907. TISCO started pig iron production in 1911 and began producing steel in 1912 as a branch of Jamsetji's Tata Group. During the First World War (1914–1918), the company maintained operations by supplying steel for the war effort in India.

In 1920, TISCO and Burmah Shell formed the Tinplate Company of India Ltd (TCIL) as a joint venture; the entity was later renamed Tata Tinplate. By 1939, TISCO operated the largest steel plant in the British Empire.

The company launched a modernisation and expansion program in 1951, which was scaled in 1958 to reach a production capacity of 2 million metric tonnes per annum (MTPA). By 1970, the company's workforce included approximately 40,000 employees in Jamshedpur and 20,000 in neighbouring coal mines.

TISCO established a New York subsidiary, Tata Inc., in 1990. The company was renamed Tata Steel Ltd. in 2005. In 2007, it acquired the UK-based Corus Group.

In 2016, Tata Steel announced it would sell its UK business, including the Port Talbot Steelworks, due to losses and broader market conditions. As of November 2021, Tata Steel posted the highest profits within the Tata Group.

In July 2019, the World Economic Forum added the Tata Steel Kalinganagar (TSK) plant to its Global Lighthouse Network, a designation for facilities utilizing advanced manufacturing technologies. In May 2025, the company opened a new facility in Odisha, expanding Kalinganagar's annual capacity from 3 million to 8 million tonnes following a ₹27,000 crore investment.

=== Nationalization attempts ===
There have been two attempts to nationalize Tata Steel. In 1971, then-Prime Minister Indira Gandhi, tried to nationalize the company, but failed. In 1979, Prime Minister Morarji Desai attempted to nationalize the company again, encouraged by Industry Minister George Fernandes and Steel Minister Biju Patnaik. However, these efforts were halted following protests from labour unions.

=== Labour welfare ===
During the early 20th century, Tata Steel introduced several labour policies, including an eight-hour workday (1912), free medical care (1915), and schools for employees' children (1917). The company also established paid time off (1920), a provident fund (1920), and accident compensation (1920). Other measures included vocational training (1921), maternity benefits (1928), profit-sharing bonuses (1934), and a retirement gratuity (1937).

== Expansions ==
=== Acquisitions ===
In 2004, Tata Steel acquired the steel-making operations of the Singapore-based NatSteel for S$486.4 million in cash. At the end of 2003, NatSteel reported a turnover of S$1.4 billion and a pre-tax profit of S$47 million. Following the acquisition's completion in 2005, these operations were managed through a wholly owned subsidiary, NatSteel Asia Private Ltd. At that time, NatSteel's finished steel capacity was approximately 2 million tonnes per annum.

In 2005, Tata Steel acquired a majority stake in the Thailand-based Millennium Steel for $130 million. This included US$73 million for a 40% stake from Siam Cement and an offer for an additional 25% at 1.13 baht per share. Renamed Tata Steel Thailand and headquartered in Bangkok, the company was 68% owned by Tata Steel as of 31 March 2013.

In 2006, Tata Steel acquired Anglo-Dutch company Corus for £4.3 billion ($8.1 billion) at 455 pence per share. On 19 November 2006, Brazil's Companhia Siderúrgica Nacional (CSN) issued a counteroffer of 475 pence per share, valuing the company at £4.5 billion ($6.04 billion). Tata raised its bid to 500 pence per share on 11 December 2006, but was quickly surpassed by a CSN offer of 515 pence per share, valuing the deal at £4.9 billion ($6.57 billion). On 31 January 2007, Tata Steel secured the acquisition with a final bid of 608 pence per share, valuing Corus at £6.7 billion ($12 billion). At the time, Corus produced four times more steel annually than Tata Steel; Corus was the world's 9th largest producer, while Tata Steel was ranked 56th. The acquisition made Tata Steel the world's 5th largest steel producer.

Tayo Rolls, formerly Tata-Yodogawa Limited, is a metal fabrication company based in Jamshedpur, India. Founded in 1968 as a joint venture between Tata Steel and Japan's Yodogawa Steels, it became a Tata Steel subsidiary in 2008. Tata Steel currently holds a 55.24% stake.

In 2007, Tata Steel's Singapore subsidiary, NatSteel Asia Pte Ltd, acquired controlling interests in two Vietnamese rolling mills for $41 million. This included 100% of Structure Steel Engineering Pte Ltd (SSE Steel) and 70% of Vinausteel Ltd. The deal added a 250,000-tonne capacity bar/wire rod mill and a 180,000-tonne reinforcing bar mill to Tata's operations.

Following insolvency proceedings initiated in July 2017, Tata Steel acquired Bhushan Steel through its subsidiary, Bamnipal Steel Ltd. The entity was renamed Tata Steel BSL. In 2021, Tata Steel amalgamated Bamnipal Steel and Tata Steel BSL, resulting in Tata Steel holding a 72.65% direct stake.

In 2019, Tata Sponge Iron Limited acquired the steel division of Usha Martin Limited (UML) for ₹4,094 crore (US$440 million). The purchase included a 1.0 MnTPA specialty steel plant in Jamshedpur, an iron ore mine, a coal mine under development, and captive power plants.

In 2022, Tata Steel Long Products (TSLP) acquired a controlling stake in Odisha-based Neelachal Ispat Nigam Ltd. for ₹12,100 crore (US$1.3 billion) after outbidding Jindal Steel and JSW Steel.

On 25 February 2025, Tata Steel Limited invested $1,238 million (₹10,727 crore) to acquire 788.5 crore additional shares of its subsidiary, T Steel Holdings Pte. Ltd., maintaining its 100% ownership.

=== Joint ventures ===
In 2006, Tata Steel and Australia's BlueScope Steel launched Tata BlueScope Steel Ltd., a joint venture for the manufacturing of pre-engineered steel products.

In 2014, Tata Steel launched Jamshedpur Continuous Annealing and Processing Company Pvt Ltd. (JCAPCPL), a joint venture with Nippon Steel to produce continuous annealed products intended for the automotive industry. The plant had a capacity of 600,000 tons, and was set up with an investment of ₹2,750 crore (US$290 million). Tata Steel held 51% of the joint venture.

=== Amalgamation ===
In 2022, the Tata Group completed the amalgamation of seven metal companies of the group into Tata Steel. The seven metal companies of Tata Group that merged into Tata Steel are Tata Steel Long Products Limited (TSLP), The Tinplate Company of India Limited (TCIL), Tata Metallics Limited (TML), TRF Limited, The Indian Steel & Wire Products Limited (ISWPL), Tata Steel Mining Limited (TSML) and S & T Mining Company Limited.

== Sports ==
Tata Steel is involved in the inception of the Tata Football Academy, TSAF Climbing Academy, Tata Archery Academy, Naval Tata Hockey Academy – Jamshedpur and Odisha Naval Tata Hockey High-Performance Centre, and is also the namesake of the Tata Steel Chess Tournament.

== Operations ==
Tata Steel is headquartered in Mumbai, Maharashtra, India, and has its marketing headquarters at the Tata Centre in Kolkata, West Bengal. It has a presence in around 50 countries with manufacturing operations in 26 countries including India, Malaysia, Vietnam, Thailand, UAE, Ivory Coast, Mozambique, South Africa, Australia, United Kingdom, The Netherlands, France and Canada.

=== Issues in Europe ===
Since Tata Steel's acquisition of Corus in 2007, Tata Steel's Europe unit faced issues from oversupply in the market, labour unions, inexpensive imports from Chinese steel makers, and pressure from regulators to decarbonize (green taxes), which forced Tata Steel to consolidate its businesses in Europe.

In 2015, Tata Steel was looking to sell its facilities in Port Talbot, Hartlepool, Rotherham, and Stocksbridge, which were put on hold due to Brexit. In April 2016, Tata Steel's Long Products Europe Division located in Scunthorpe, England was sold to Greybull Capital LLP. The unit was renamed as British Steel Limited.

In February 2017, the company decided to sell its specialty division to Liberty House Group.

In September 2017, ThyssenKrupp of Germany and Tata Steel announced plans to combine their European steel-making businesses. The deal will restructure the European assets of ThyssenKrupp and Tata Steel as an equal joint venture. The announcement estimated that the company would become Europe's second-largest steelmaker as a result of the merger, and planned for its future headquarters in Amsterdam. However, in 2019, antitrust regulators of EU refused to accept deals citing reduction in competition. In 2019 Tata Steel decided to sell some of its non-core business units in UK.

In June 2020, the company requested £500 million in UK government support. Later in July media houses reported that the company proposed to transfer 50% of its stake in Port Talbot Steelworks to the UK Government, in return for capital injections amounting to £900 million.

On 11 September 2024, Tata Steel UK announced that 2,500 jobs would be lost at the Port Talbot steelworks, despite a £500 million taxpayer-backed deal from the UK Government.

In November 2020, SSAB of Sweden announced its intention to purchase Tata Steel's unit in IJmuiden, Netherlands. However, in 2021, SSAB backed out, citing technical and cost issues involved with the deal.

In October 2021, Tata Steel Europe officially split its businesses into two independent entities, Tata Steel Netherlands and Tata Steel UK.

In April 2022, Tata Steel announced that it would find alternative sources of coal for its steel production plants in the UK and the Netherlands after European nations stopped doing business with Russia in response to its invasion of Ukraine.

=== Issues in Southeast Asia ===
In January 2019, citing debt issues and consistent losses, Tata Steel decided to sell a 70 percent stake in its S.E. Asia business (NatSteel and Tata Steel Thailand) to China's state-owned HBIS Group for $327 million. However, the deal eventually fell through, with both companies citing regulatory issues.

Later in 2019, Tata Group signed a memorandum of understanding with the Private Equity firm, Synergy Metals and Mining Fund for divestment of 70% shareholding in Tata Steel (Thailand) Public Company Ltd. (excluding NatSteel).

In 2021, Tata Steel decided against divesting the Southeast Asian businesses, citing improvement in financials, including a reduction in total debt and an increase in the cash flow. This was confirmed through its regulatory filing, where Tata Steel reclassified its S.E. Asian assets from 'held for sale' to 'continuing operations'.

In October 2021, Tata Steel announced the sale of its subsidiary, Natsteel Holdings Pte. Ltd to Top Tip Holding Pte, a Singapore-based steel and iron ore trading company. The deal was valued at $172 million (₹1,275 crore) and included two Singapore facilities and one Malaysian facility excluding the wire business in Thailand.

== Shareholders ==
As of 29 September 2023, the Tata Group held 33.90% shares in Tata Steel. 9.44% of its shares are held by private shareholders. Life Insurance Corporation of India is the largest non-promoter shareholder in the company with 10.89% shareholding.

| Shareholders | Shareholding |
|---|---|
| Promoters: Tata Group companies | 33.90% |
| Insurance Companies | 10.89% |
| Individual shareholders | 9.44% |
| Foreign Institutional Investors | 20.31% |
| GDRs | 5.06% |
| Others | 20.39% |
| Total | 99.99% |

The equity shares of Tata Steel are listed on the Bombay Stock Exchange, where it is a constituent of the BSE SENSEX index, and the National Stock Exchange of India, where it is a constituent of the S&P CNX Nifty, the Global Depository Receipts (GDRs) are listed on the London Stock Exchange and the Luxembourg Stock Exchange.

== Subsidiaries ==
=== Mjunction ===
Mjunction is a B2B e-commerce joint venture between Tata Steel and SAIL, established in 2001, that operates an online marketplace and e-auction services for industrial procurement, including steel.

- rivexa by mjunction - B2B Online Marketplace for Custom Manufacturing Services

=== Tata Steel Thailand ===
Tata Steel's subsidiary, Tata Steel (Thailand) Public Company Limited (SET: TSTH), (formerly Millennium Steel Public Company Limited) is listed on the Stock Exchange of Thailand. Tata Steel Limited directly holds 67.90% through its investment arm T S Global Holdings Pte. Ltd.

=== Tata Tinplate ===
The Tinplate Company of India Limited (TCIL) is a subsidiary of Tata Steel. Founded in 1920, TCIL is India's oldest and current largest tinplate manufacturer. The company is described as having "pioneered the tinplate industry in India". TCIL has a 70% market share in India and exports a fourth of its products outside India.

In January 1920, the Burmah Oil and The Tata Iron & Steel Company (TISCO) jointly incorporated The Tinplate Company of India Limited (TCIL) to cater to the demand for tinplate that arose following World War I. Burmah contributed two-thirds of the startup capital and Tata the remainder. Burmah required tinplate for the cans used to hold the kerosene it produced.

By November 1921, structural steel for the plant and machinery had been imported from the US and UK, and the plant was established at Golmuri, Jamshedpur, near the Tata Steelworks. The design was based on an Indiana rolling plant. In December 1922, the first hot dip tinning plant started operations. By 1924, a total of six mills were in production, and the company was producing almost 40 percent of India's tinplate needs. In 1926, the level of production exceeded the country's imports for the first time. The company's main competition was from tinplate imported from South Wales. In its early years, the company relied to a large extent on European 'covenanted' labor for supervisory and skilled roles, but this lessened over time as the skills of Indian workers developed. Just under 3,000 workers were employed in the late 1920s and early 1930s.

With the outbreak of World War II, TCIL diversified into the manufacturing of untinned black plates used in Jettison tanks for the Royal Air Force. Also, TCIL took over the processing of steel from the sheet mills of Tata Steel to augment production.

TCIL agreed with Wean United Canada to switch to the Electrolytic Tinning Process. In 1973, an Electrolytic Tinning Line was commissioned with a capacity of 90,000 tons per annum to produce tinplate and tin-free steel. In 1996, TCIL established its first Cold Rolling Mill Complex with a capacity of 110,000 tons per annum, as part of a backward integration to reduce dependency on imported uncoated sheet steel coils, known as tin mill black plate (TMBP). In 2005, a printing and lacquering line was introduced as part of a forward integration to reduce supply chain inefficiencies. In 2007, mill capacity was more than doubled to 379,000 tons by the commissioning of a second Tinning Line; a second Cold Rolling Mill facility was added a year later. Production and sales reached 360,000 tons in 2018–19.

In 2012, Tata Steel increased its shareholding in TCIL to 73.44% which currently stands at 74.96%.

Through volumes, TCIL holds 70% market share in India and exports 25% of the production to Southeast Asia, Europe, and the Middle East.

In August 2021, it announced its expansion plans, with an additional capacity of 300,000 tons per annum.

In September 2022, it was announced that the company would be merged into Tata Steel.

== Environmental concerns ==
The Dhamra Port, a joint venture between Larsen & Toubro and Tata Steel near the Dhamra river in the Bhadrak district of Odisha, has received criticism from groups such as Greenpeace, the Wildlife Protection Society of India, and the National Fishworkers Forum for causing environmental harm to the local ecology.

The port is located within five kilometres of the Bhitarkanika National Park, a Ramsar wetland of international importance that is home to a diversity of mangrove species, saltwater crocodiles, and avian species. It is also approximately 15 km from the turtle nesting ground of Gahirmatha Beach, and turtles have been found in the area immediately adjoining the port site. Beyond potential impacts on the nesting and feeding grounds of turtles, the mudflats of the port site are breeding grounds for horseshoe crabs as well as rare species of reptiles and amphibians.

In response, the company stated that it had been working with the International Union for Conservation of Nature (IUCN) for guidance and assistance in implementing environmental standards and designing mitigation measures for potential hazards during construction and operation of the port. The port began commercial operations in May 2011.

== In media ==
=== Documentaries ===
- Tata Steel: Seventy Five Years of the Indian Steel Industry, directed by Shyam Benegal in 1983.
- Tata Steel: Spirit of Steel, directed by Zafar Hai in 2007.
- Crucible of Fire, directed by Stephen Alter and narrated by Victor Banerjee in 2008.

== See also ==
- List of steel producers
- List of companies of India
- List of largest companies by revenue
- List of corporations by market capitalization
- Make in India
- Forbes Global 2000
- Fortune India 500
- Tata Group
- Russi Mody
