= Maan, Pune =

Maan
- Pune Metropolitan Region
- Interactive map of Maan
- Country: India
- State: Maharashtra
- District: Pune

Government
  - Body: Gram Panchayat
- Elevation: 570 m (1,870 ft)

Languages
  - Official: Marathi
- Time zone: UTC+5:30 (IST)
- PIN: 411057
- Vehicle registration: MH-14
- Civic agency: Pune Metropolitan Region Development Authority (PMRDA)

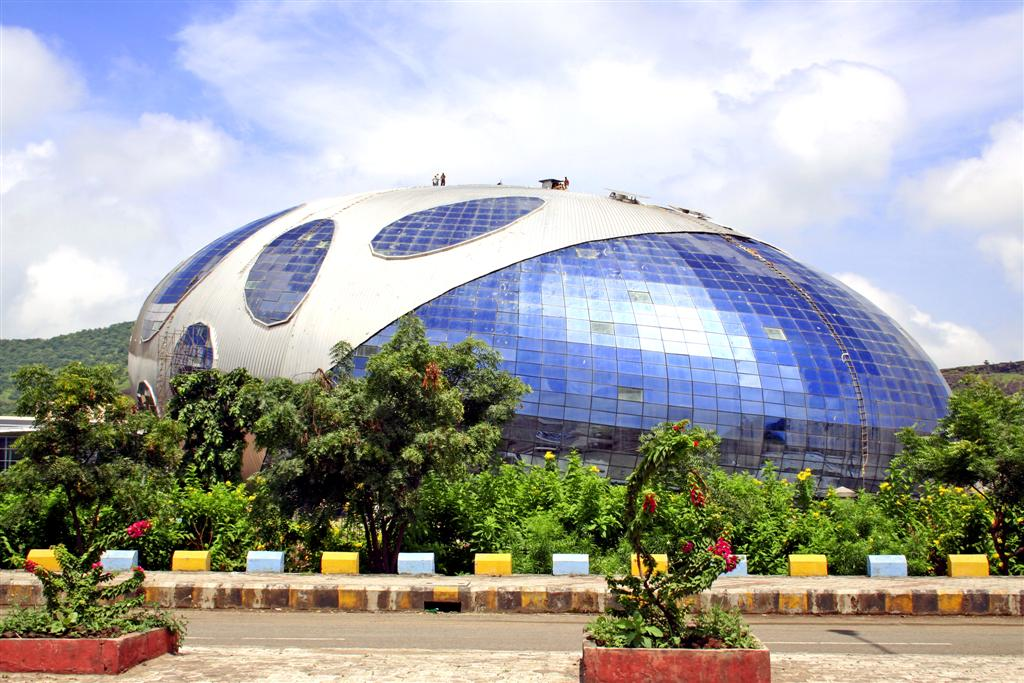

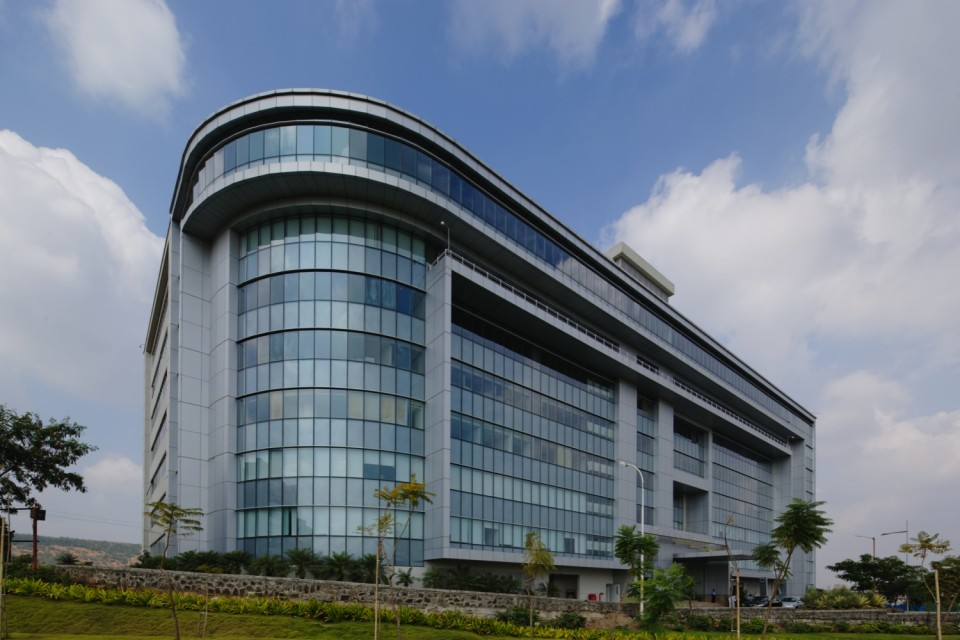

Maan is a part of Pune district close to Pune city, in the state of Maharashtra, India. Parts of the Rajiv Gandhi Infotech Park Phase 2 & 3 are located in it, which makes it an important region. It is under the administrative control of Pune Metropolitan Region Development Authority (PMRDA). Maan was a rural area, but with the establishment of multinational companies and construction of residential high-rises since the 2000s, it has developed into an urban center.

== Transport ==
Maan is connected by Megapolis Circle station of the metro railway to various parts of Pune. Air-conditioned and ordinary bus services are available for its residents.
