= Chinchwad =

- Neighbourhood
- Chinchwad
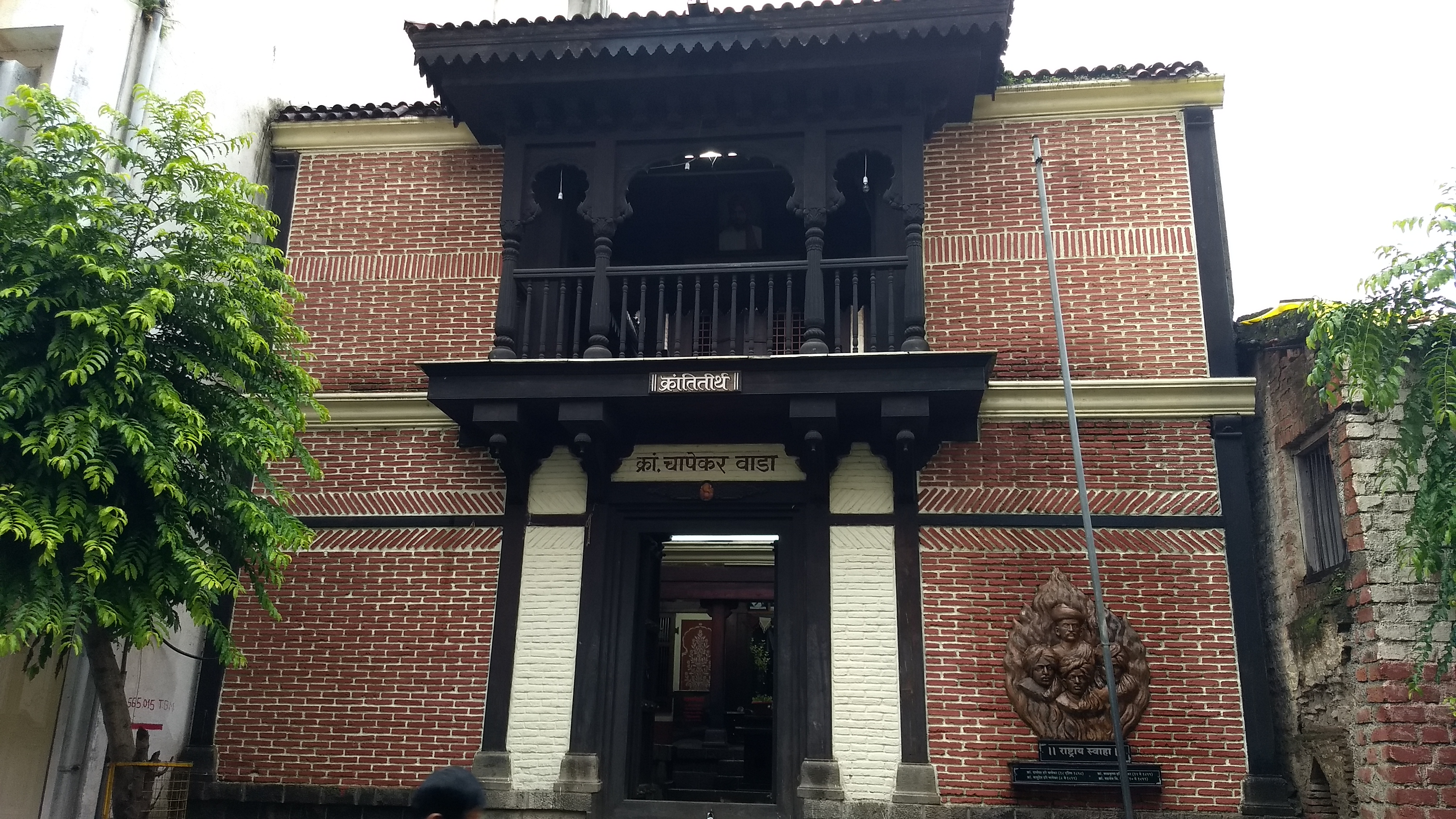
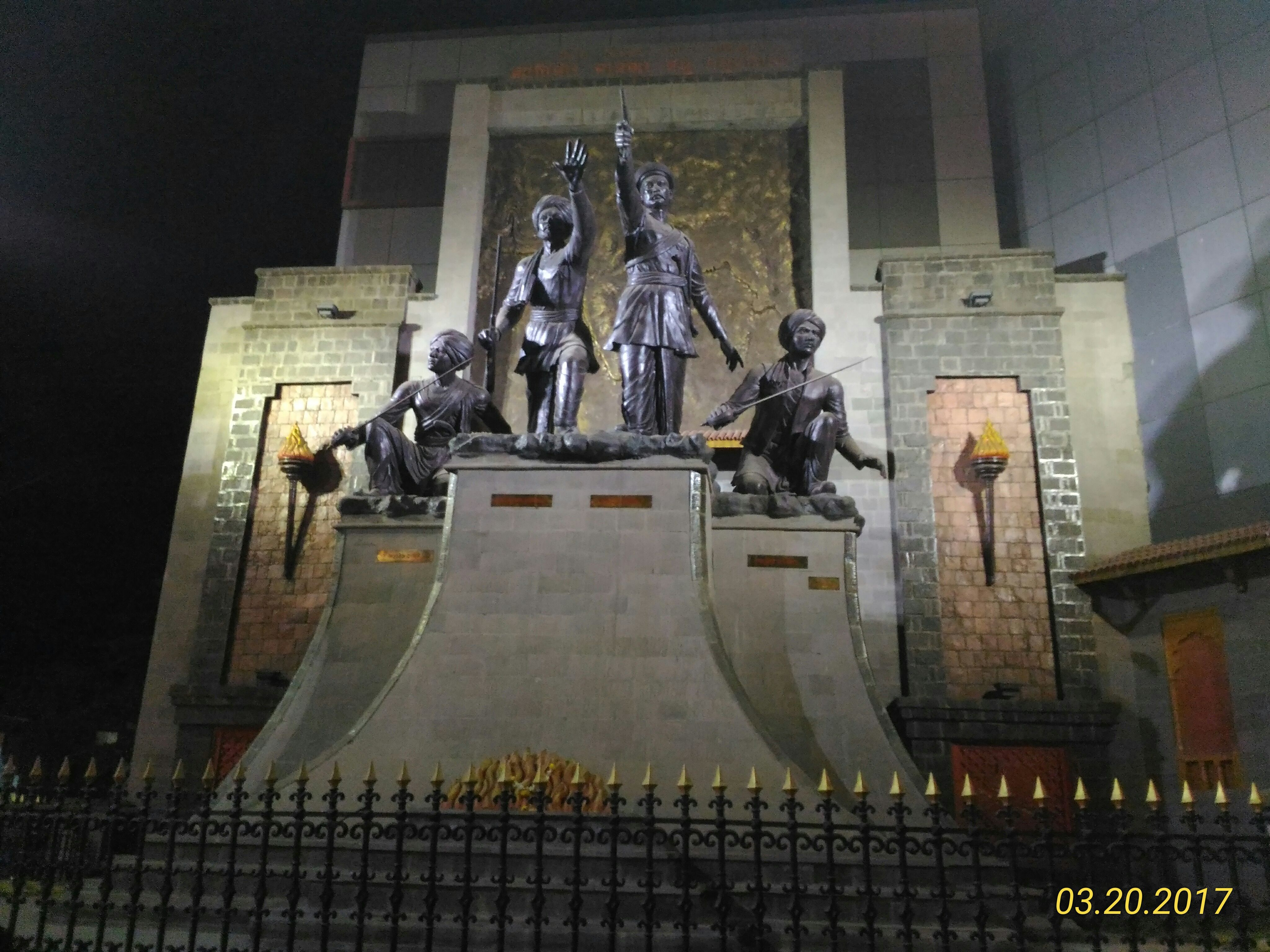
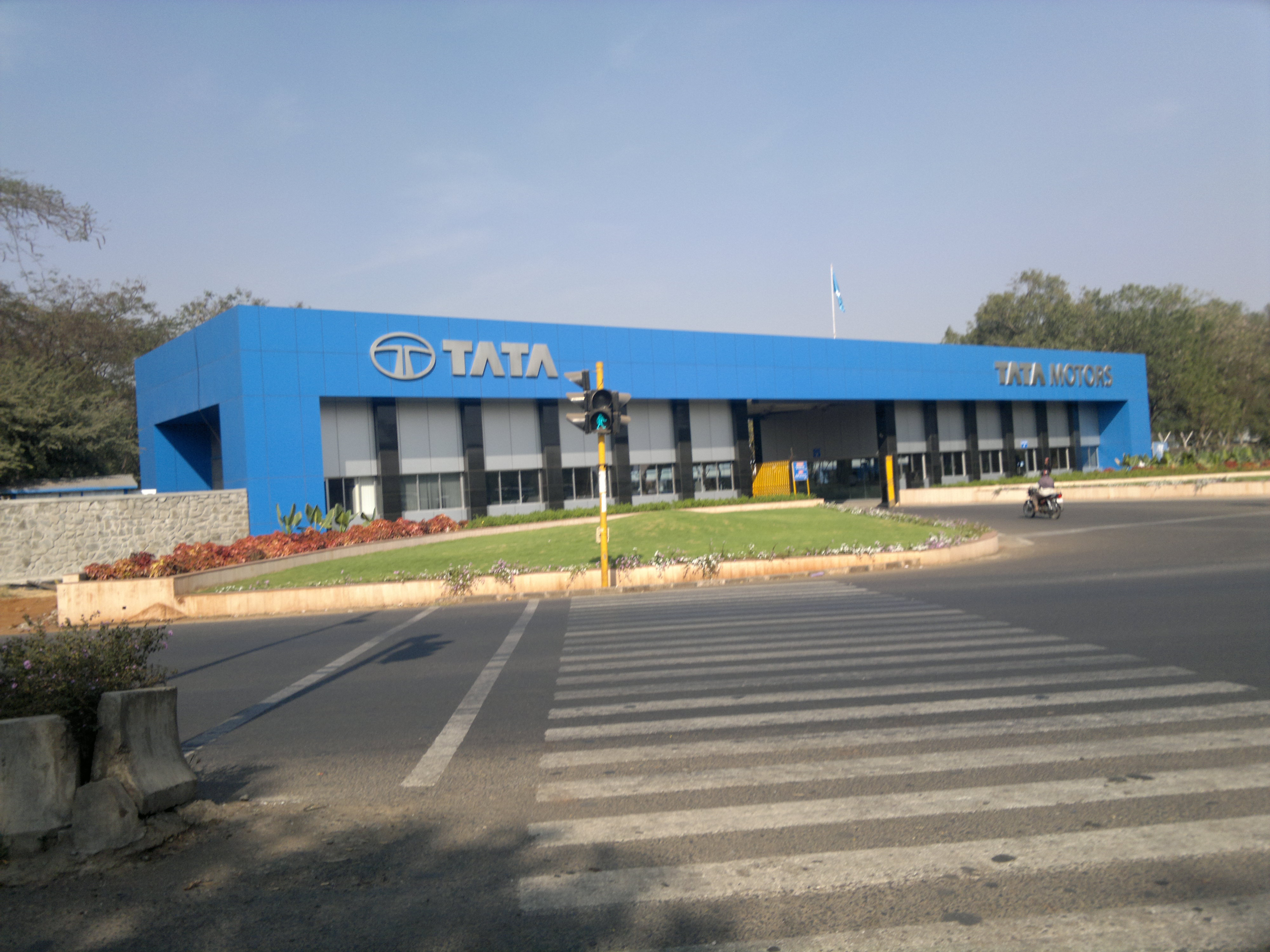
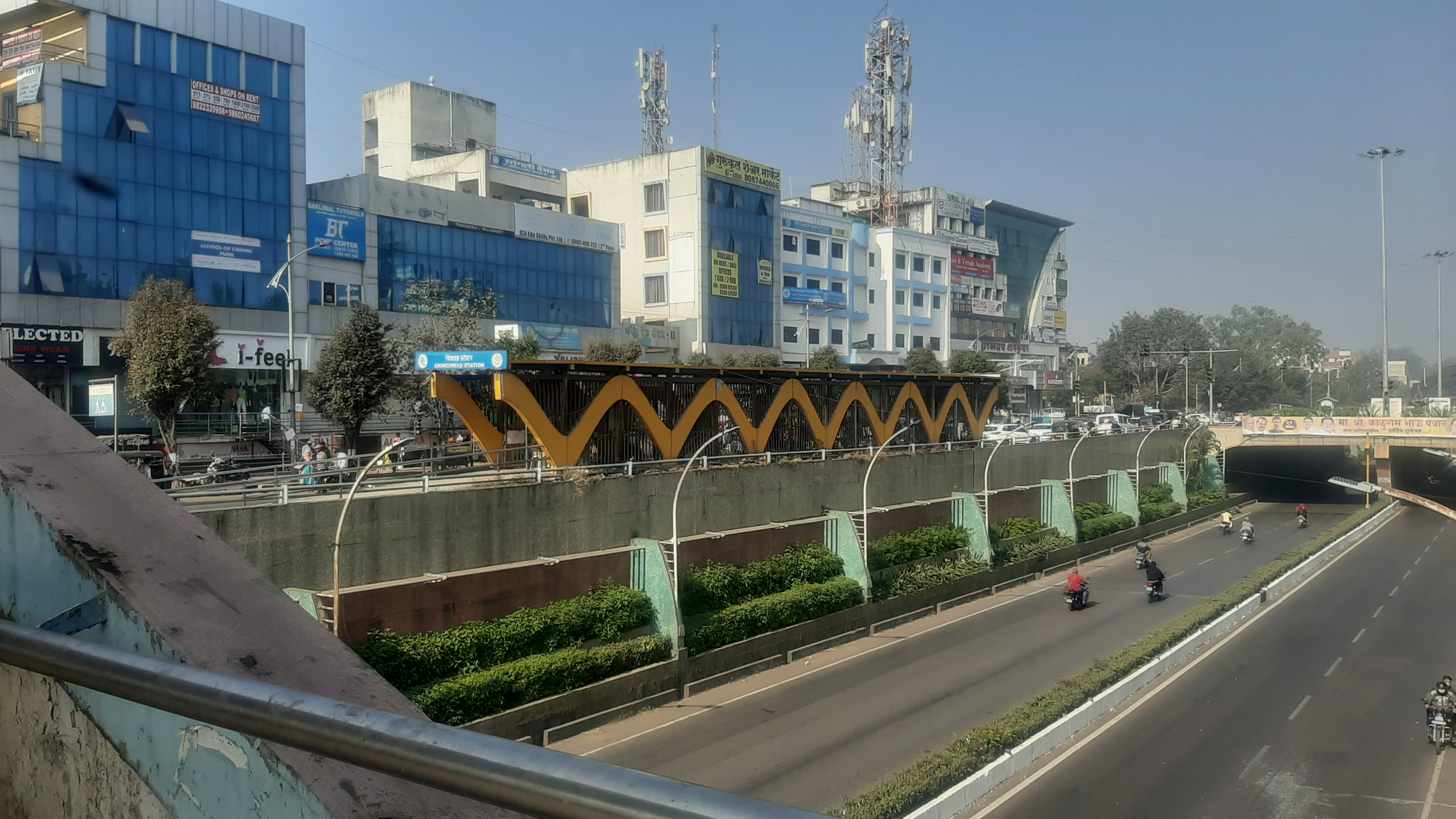
- Clockwise from top: Chaperkar wada, Tata Motors Plant, Chinhwchad BRT Stop, Chaphekar Brother's statue
- Interactive map of Chinchwad
- Country: India
- State: Maharashtra
- District: Pune
- City: Pimpri-Chinchwad

Government
  - Type: Municipal Corporation
  - Body: Pimpri Chinchwad Municipal Corporation, Pune

Languages
  - Official: Marathi & English
- Time zone: UTC+5:30 (IST)
- PIN: 411033
- Area code: 020
- Vehicle registration: MH 14

Chinchwad is an upscale locality in the city of Pimpri-Chinchwad, about 15 km (9.3 mi) northwest of the historic city of Pune, and is situated on the banks of the river Pavana. The neighborhood is home to extensive industry and is well known for its automotive, pharmaceutical, electrical products, electronics and hardware, aerospace and manufacturing units.

The locality has a museum dedicated to the Chapekar brothers who were active during the Indian independence movement. It has a temple of Sant Morya Gosavi Maharaj who was a big devotee of Lord Ganesha and he built a shrine for Lord known as "Mangulmurti Wada". It has a Zoo dedicated to the poet Bahinabai Chaudhari known as The Nisargakavi Bahinabai Chaudhary Zoo. It has a science museum known as the Pimpri Chinchwad Science Park which has interactive exhibits, automotive models and a 3.5-acre park with sculptures.

== Demographics ==
The main and the most spoken language of the city is Marathi. Hindi is the second most spoken language, followed by English. Due to presence of many IT companies in the adjacent suburb of Pune; Hinjawadi, and automobile companies in the city, the area is home to diverse ethnic groups. Sub-localities include Bijlinagar, Akurdi, Pradhikaran, Dalvinagar, and Chinchwadgoan.

== Geography ==
Chinchwad is located at a height of 570 m (1,870 ft) above sea level on the western side of the Deccan Plateau. It lies at 18° 37" North latitude and 73° 48" East longitude.

Chinchwad is situated on the Pavana River which is a tributary of the Bhima River.

== History ==
The city of Chinchwad has been famous for being the birthplace of the freedom fighters Chapekar brothers. The historic Morya Gosavi Maharaj Sanjivan Samadhi Mandir, built in the 15th century and the Mangalmurti wada are situated in old Chinchwad or Chinchwadgaon region. The most famous devotee of Lord Ganesh. He was a Hindu saint who lived from 1375 CE to 1561 CE and he was a prominent saint for the Ganapatya sect of Hindus.

With rapid industrialization and urbanization in 1990s, the population of Chinchwad started growing gradually. Chinchwad hosts companies like SKF, Tata Motors, Cotton Greaves, Premier, KSB and many other companies. Chinchwad has prominent and well developed residential pockets namely Bijalinagar, Premlok Park, Udyognagar, Tanajinagar, Keshavnagar, Shahunagar and Sambhajinagar. Empire Estate and Queenstown are popular residential complexes in Chinchwad. With the opening of Elpro City Square near Chaphekar Chowk in 2019, a one-stop shopping and entertainment destination, Chinchwad has become a self-sufficient and upmarket suburb of Pune. It also has malls namely Premier Plaza Mall, Aishwaryam One, Gems Crystal Mall and has stores of Star Bazaar and DMart too. With the onset of Metro along the Old Mumbai-Pune highway, various land parcels of industries are being redeveloped into luxurious residential complexes and business parks.

Chinchwad has many recreational spaces like Jijau Paryatan Kendra, Bird Valley, Nisargkavi Bahinabai Chaudhary Zoo, Pimpri Chinchwad Krida Udyan, BharatRatna Atal Bihari Vajpayee Udyan, Joggers Park, Science Park and many other small gardens. Ramkrushna More Natyagruha is a spacious auditorium in Chinchwad.

== Culture ==
=== Festivities and Celebrations ===
Ganesh Chaturthi is celebrated with a lot of rigour and joy. Dasara is also one of the important festivals. Not only Ganesh Chaturthi, every Chaturthi there is a celebration at Morya Gosavi temple and a Chaturthi bazaar along the streets in Gandhi Peth.

=== Performing Arts ===
Chinchwad holds a Sankashti Chaturthi Sangeet Sabha. It is managed and organized by the Anaahat Sangeet Academy at the Mangalmurti Wada.

The PCMC Administration holds the annual 'Swarsagar Cultural Festival' every year either in Sai Udyan (Sambhajinagar) or Nigdi Pradhikaran area. Artists like Pandit Jasraj, Gundecha Brothers, Niladri Kumar, Mahesh Kale, Kaushiki Chakraborty, Rajendra Gangani, Kishori Amonkar, Vijay Ghate, Rakesh Chaurasia, Ulhas Kashalkar, Suresh Talwalkar, Saleel Kulkarni, Sandeep Khare, Ghulam Mustafa Khan, Purbayan Chatterjee, Rahul Deshpande, Shridhar Phadke, Sawani Shende- Sathaye, Ajay Pohankar, Upendra Bhat, Suhas Vyas have performed there.

In addition to it, the Morya Gosavi Devasthan Trust also holds the 'Morya Gosavi Samadhi Sangeet Mahotsav' wherein Indian classical musicians have performed.

The Vasantrao Deshpande Memorial Foundation and the Anindo Chatterjee Tabla Foundation annually present classical music festivals in the city.

=== Prominent Performing Arts Venues ===
The Pimpri-Chinchwad Municipal Corporation maintains several theatres, including The Ramkrushna More Auditorium, Acharya Atre Rangmandir, Kashidham Mangal Karyalaya, Autocluster Hall, Anu Aga Hall, Natasamrat Nilu Phule Rangmandir, and Ankushrao Landge Natyagruha.

The Ramkrushna More Auditorium was recently renovated.

== Education ==
=== Schools ===
- St. Andrew's High School, Chinchwad
- Podar International School, Chinchwad (CBSE)
- Blossom Public School (CBSE)
- Creative Academy School, Nigdi
- Podar International School, Kharalwadi, Pimpri (ICSE)
- Dheeraj International School, Pune
- Shri Shri Ravishankar School, Moshi
- City International School, Morwadi, Pimpri
- VIBGYOR Roots and Rise, Chinchwad
- Elpro International School, Chinchwad
- Rasiklal Dhariwal International School
- Sau. Tarabai Shankarlal Mutha Kanya Prashala ( Jain Vidyalaya)
- Shrimati Parvatibai Vidyalaya (MSS Highschool), Chinchwad
- Shrimati Godawari Hindi Vidyalaya, Chinchwad

== Clinics and Hospitals ==
- Aditya Birla Memorial Hospital
- Niramay Hospital
- Moraya Multispeciality Hospital
- Lokmanya Hospital (Nigdi)
- Pharande Dental Clinic
- Swami Samarth Hospital
- YCM Hospital (Government)
- 7 Orange Hospital
- Brahmachaitanya Superspeciality Hospital
- Matruchaya Hospital
- Lokmanya Holistic Cancer Care & Research Centre

== Transport ==
Chinchwad is well connected by road, rail and air. The nearest airport is Pune Airport, with the Maharashtra government planning to set up a new airport in Purandar. Pune – Lonavala suburban local trains run through this area. The railway station for this area is Chinchwad Railway Station. It has two State Transport Bus stands- Pimpri-Chinchwad Bus Stand at Vallabhnagar and near Chinchwad Station. Pune Mahanagar Parivahan Mahamandal Limited (formed by merger of PCMT and PMT) operates the public transport system in this area. The Maharashtra government has proposed metro connectivity to Chinchwad under the Pune Metro project. A Rainbow BRTS system is also active in this area with the main bus station named after Ashok Kamte.

Here are a list of bus routes from Chinchwad which are currently being run by PMPML

Route number	Destination	Notes
36	Manapa Bhavan	This route goes via Dange Chowk and Aundh
44	Katraj/Akurdi Railway Station	This route goes via Katraj-Dehu Road Bypass
74	Paud Gaon	
122	Manapa Bhavan	This route goes via Pimpri and Wakdewadi
204	Bhekrainagar	
276	Warje Malwadi and NDA Gate	
298	Katraj	This route goes via Dange Chowk, PMC and Mandai
304	Bhosari	
307	Ravet ISKCON Mandir	
312	Pune Railway Station	This route goes via YCM Hospital and Yerwada
313	Chandkhed	
316	Khamboli	
320	Hinjewadi Phase 3	Route goes via Maan Gaon
322	Manapa Bhavan/Akurdi Railway Station	Route goes via Pimple Gurav and Rahatani
322A	Manapa Bhavan/Akurdi Railway Station	Route goes via Pimpri
337	Wagholi	
351	Alandi/Jambhe	
N14	Akurdi Railway Station	
P13	PCMC Metro Station/Mukai Chowk Kiwale	

== Gallery ==
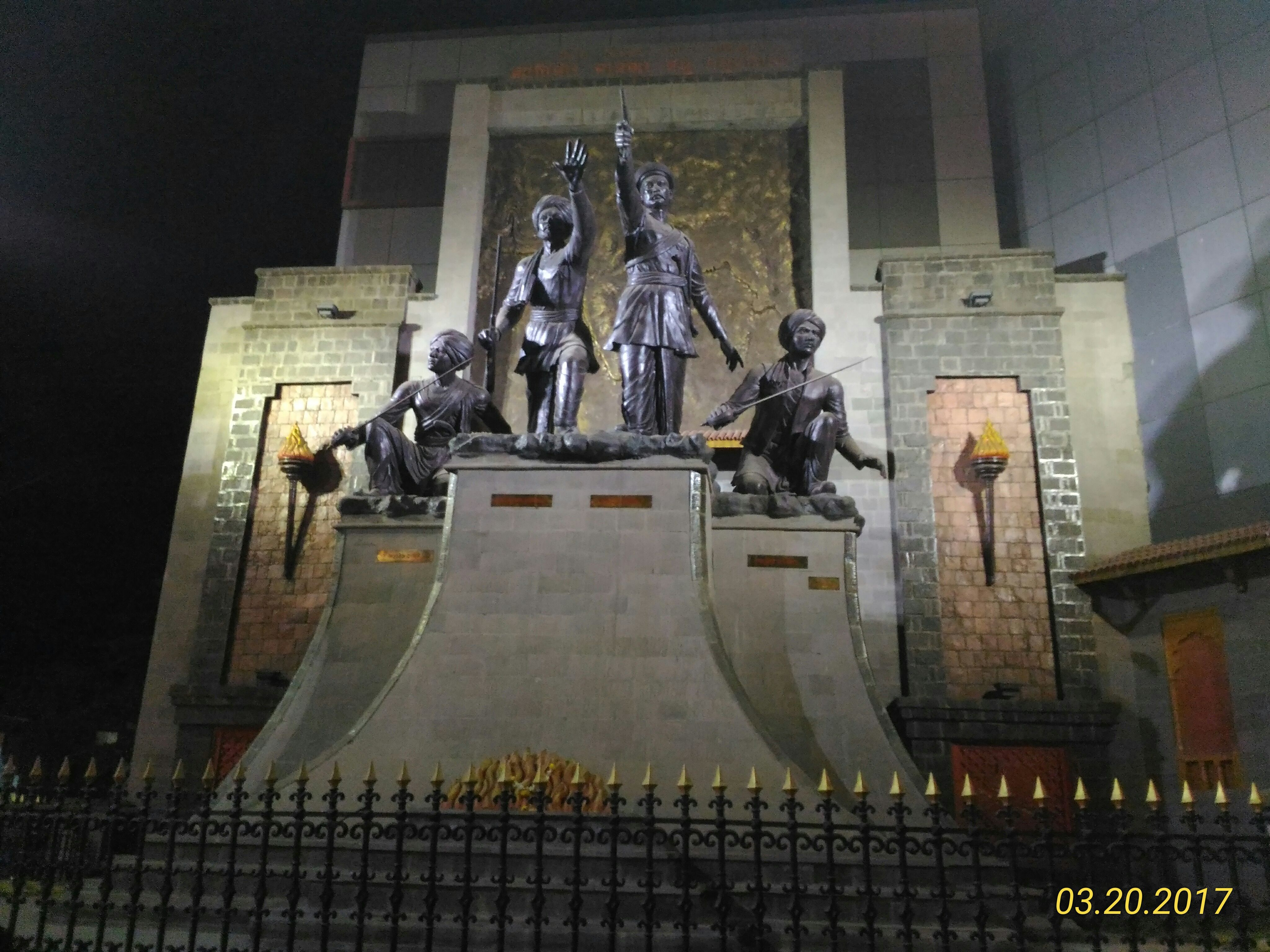
Chapekars Brothers Statue

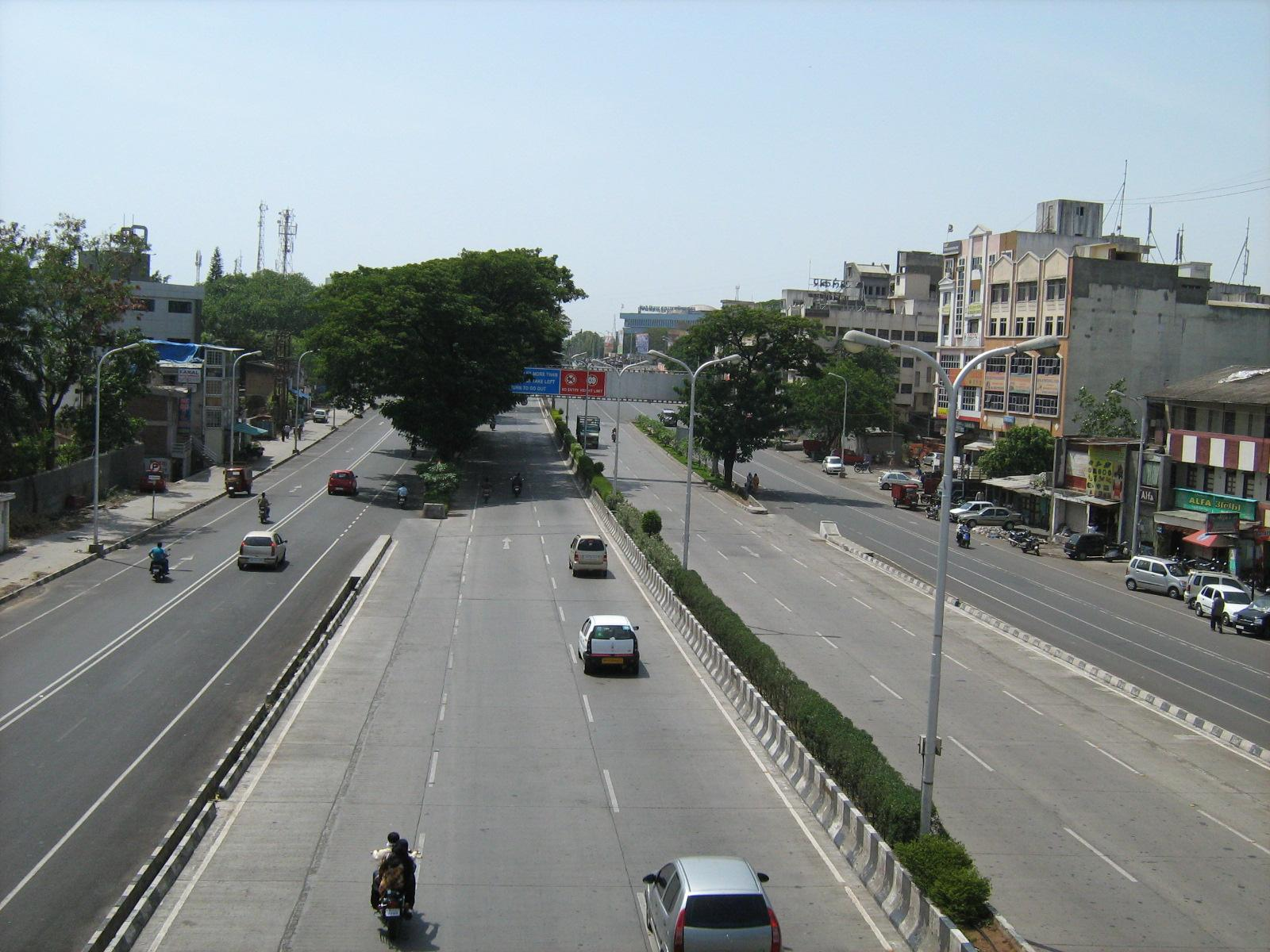
Old Pune-Mumbai Highway

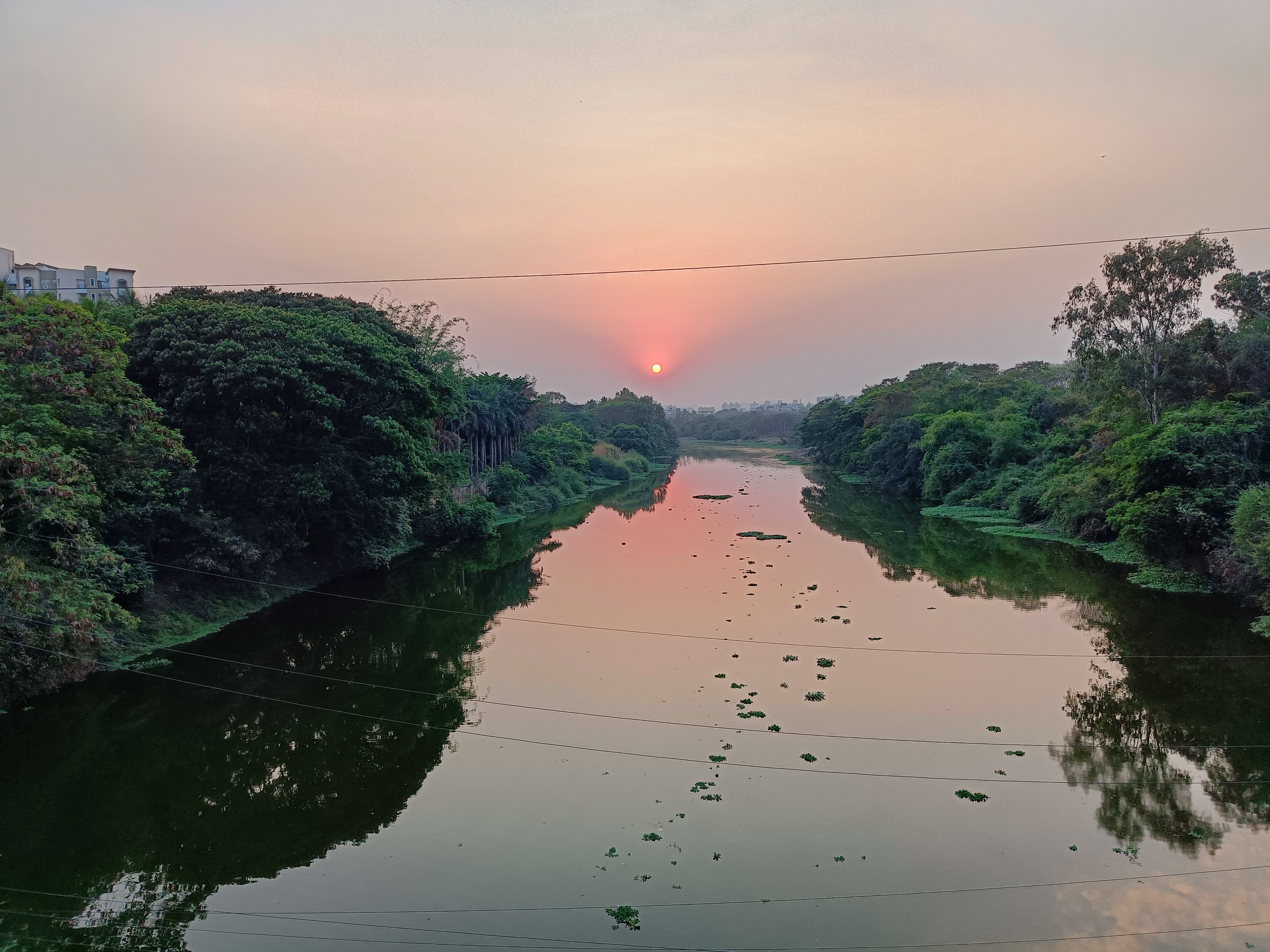
Mula River

== See also ==
- Pune
- Pimpri-Chinchwad
- List of roads in Pune
- Morya Gosavi
