= Marunji =

Village in Maharashtra

- Village
- Location in Maharashtra, India Marunji (India)
- Country: India
- State: Maharashtra
- District: Pune
- Tehsil: Mulshi

Government
  - Type: Panchayati raj (India)
  - Body: Gram panchayat

Languages
  - Official: Marathi
- Time zone: UTC+5:30 (IST)
- Telephone code: 02114
- ISO 3166 code: IN-MH
- Vehicle registration: MH-14
- Website: pune.nic.in

Marunji is a village in Mulshi taluka of Pune district in the state of Maharashtra, India.

It is mainly known for the Rajiv Gandhi Infotech Park (which also extends to adjacent Maan and Hinjawadi). Hinjawadi Industries Association (HIA) was formed to provide a joint forum to all stakeholders based out of Hinjawadi and took care of the surrounding area of Marunji.

Talukas surrounding the village are Karjat taluka, Talegaon Dabhade Taluka, Mawal taluka and Khalapur taluka. Districts closest to the village are Raigad district, Thane district, Mumbai City district and Mumbai Suburban district. Nearest railway stations around the village are Vadgaon railway station and Begdewadi railway station. Proposed Pink Line of Pune Metro will pass form Shivaji Chowk on Hinjawadi-Marunji Road.
