= Jnana Prabodhini Prashala =

High school in Pune, India

Jnana Prabodhini Prashala.
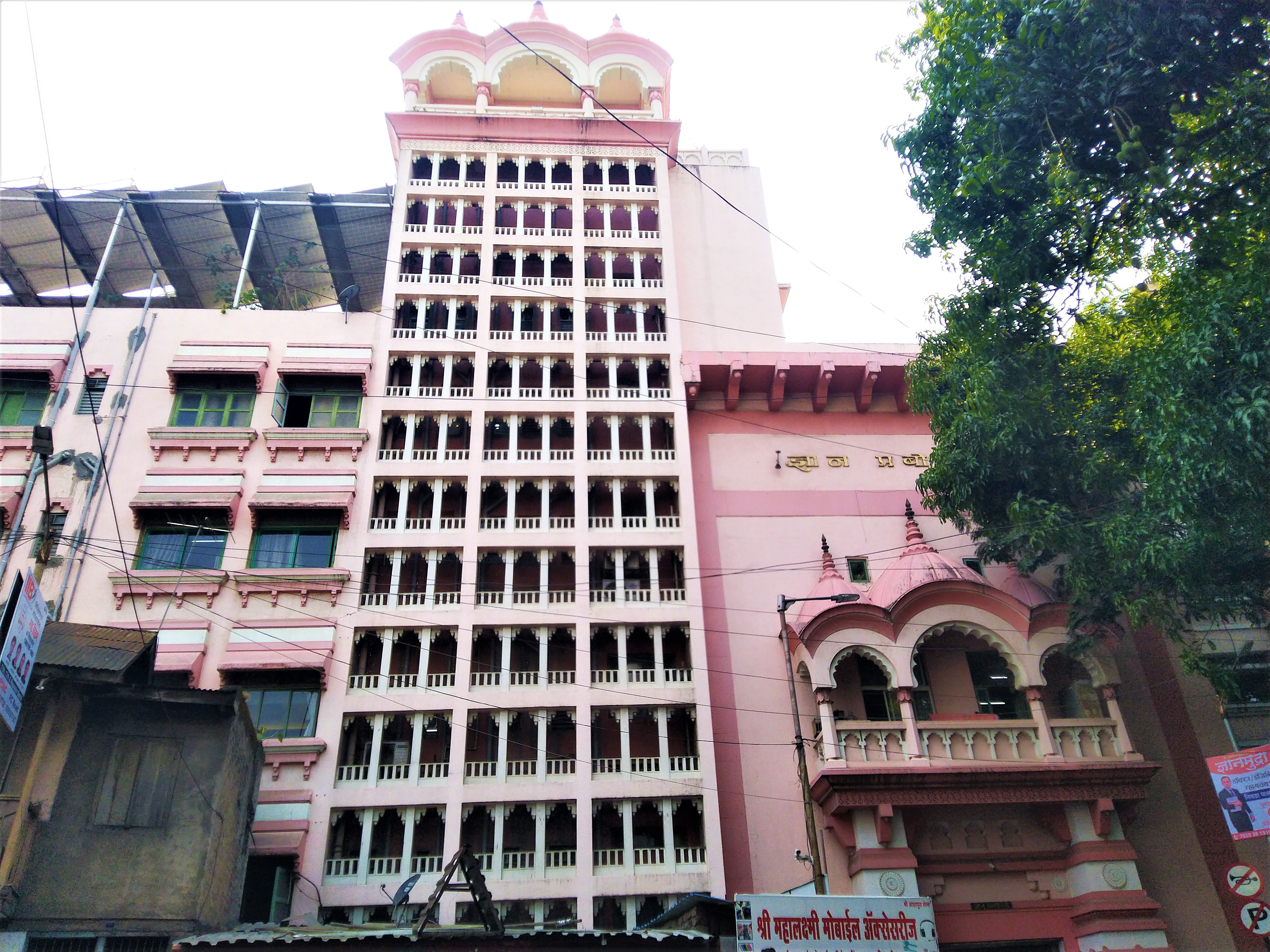

Location
- 510, Sadashiv Peth, Pune; Maharashtra; India; 18.51180°N 73.84556°E

Information
- Motto: अविद्यया मृत्युम् तीर्त्वा विद्यया अमृतम् अश्नुते Motivating Intelligence for Social Change
- Established: 1969
- Website: www.jnanaprabodhini.org/jnana-prabodhini-prashala-2/

Jnana Prabodhini Prashala, is a high school located in Sadashiv Peth, Pune, India. It was started by educationist Dr. V. V. Pendse, in 1962. The main branch is situated in Sadashiv Peth, a neighborhood historically known as a hub for Pune's Chitpavan Brahmin community. Because schools naturally draw heavily from their surrounding neighborhoods and established community networks, the local demographic has historically reflected this concentration.

The principal of the school is Dr. Milind Naik. The educational system is based development of the various mental and intellectual aspects of brain. The school entertains mainly the 'gifted' students. The students are selected through a two level entrance examination in which the Basic Mental Ability of a candidate is tested.

1. Philosophy 2. History 3. Infrastructure 4. Educational Philosophy 5. Educational Activities

A hostel is available for male and female students attending school from outside of Pune.

== Admissions ==
The school selects students to Class 5 on the basis of a two-step entrance test. Prospective students are required to take tests on reasoning ability and mathematics. Selected students are required to take additional tests and attend an interview. 40 boys and 40 girls are short-listed for admission. The Supreme Court of India rejected the ban on entrance examinations and has allowed the school to proceed the admissions process to continue in February 2014. Earlier in 2013, The Pune Zilla Parishad had challenged the school's admission process of having its own screening of students.

== Academics and Co-Curricular Activities ==
The academic courses include:

1. Mathematics
2. Science
3. Social Science
4. English
5. Sanskrit
6. Marathi

However, apart from academic courses, the school gives special attention to self-expression arts such as:

1. Drama
2. Sculpture
3. Painting
4. Elocution and Speech
5. Vocal Music
6. Instrumental Music including Tabla and Harmonium
7. Dance

The school follows a scheme of continuous evaluation, which includes weekly tests, term end examinations, quarterly examinations, assignments and projects. It was one of the pioneers to introduce project-based learning in India. Student from Class 5 to Class 10, have to do an annual project each year.

Class	Project	
5	Object Collection	News Article Collection
6	Model-making	
7	Writing	
8	Open-ended Research in Science	
9	Futurology	

In class 7, students have to complete a list of tasks within the stipulated time period. These tasks include observing various objects, analysing images, solving logical puzzles, memorizing long texts in four different languages, etc. These tasks have been prepared under the banner of "Gunavikas Yojana” or development of life skills. This development helps the student to pursue the greater academic and extra-academic demands in his/her higher classes. Under this scheme, the top performing students in these life skills are granted with a scholarship.

In class 9, students study futurology and enrol themselves in various SPGs (Special Purpose Groups), which are linked with the futurology project. Students choose various SPGs like Economics, Energy, National Integration, Public Health, Environment, etc.

In class 10, students choose any of the previous or a new project by themselves. The school is perhaps (?) the only one in India to encourage futurology projects in class 10.

Along with this, students at Jnana Prabodhini are known for their involvement in every aspects other than curricular studies which include:

1. Dhol-Barchi Pathak during Ganeshotsav.
2. Excursions to remote villages in Velhe.
3. Art exhibition (Abhivyakti Pratyakshik)
4. Athletic Skills Demonstration (Dal Pratyakshik)

Jnana Prabodhini began e-learning in July 2011.

== Notable alumni ==
- General M. M. Naravane 27th Chief of Army Staff (COAS)
- Lt. Gen S. S. Hasabnis - Deputy Chief of Army Staff (P&S)
- Avinash Dharmadhikari - Ex-IAS, Founder of Chanakya Mandal Pariwar

== See also ==
- List of schools in Pune
