= Man, Vikramgad =

Village in Maharashtra

Man Maan
- village
- Location in Maharashtra, India Man (India)
- Coordinates: 19.78318046°N 73.08255672°E
- Country: India
- State: Maharashtra
- District: Palghar
- Taluka: Palghar
- Elevation: 53 m (174 ft)

Population (2011)
  - Total: 1,263
- Time zone: UTC+5:30 (IST)
- 2011 census code: 551804

Man, also known as Maan, is a village in the Palghar district of Maharashtra, India. It is located in the Vikramgad taluka.

== Demographics ==
According to the 2011 census of India, Man has 206 households. The effective literacy rate (i.e. the literacy rate of population excluding children aged 6 and below) is 76.99%.

Demographics (2011 Census)
	Total	Male	Female
Population	1263	605	658
Children aged below 6 years	159	80	79
Scheduled caste	0	0	0
Scheduled tribe	1237	593	644
Literates	850	436	414
Workers (all)	509	260	249
Main workers (total)	466	246	220
Main workers: Cultivators	98	56	42
Main workers: Agricultural labourers	324	167	157
Main workers: Household industry workers	5	1	4
Main workers: Other	39	22	17
Marginal workers (total)	43	14	29
Marginal workers: Cultivators	5	1	4
Marginal workers: Agricultural labourers	17	4	13
Marginal workers: Household industry workers	1	1	0
Marginal workers: Others	20	8	12
Non-workers	754	345	409
