= Mahesh Bhupathi Tennis Academy =

Indian tennis training facility

Mahesh Bhupathi Tennis Academy is a tennis training facility started by Indian tennis player Mahesh Bhupathi. The academy has facilities across nine states in India as well as in the UAE. In India, it is located at Amritsar, Jalandhar, Gurgaon, Delhi, Vadodara, Pune, Mumbai, Guwahati, Kolkata, Karur, Kochin and Tiruvanantapuram.
