= Talawade, Pune =

Industrial area in Pune, India

Coordinates: 18.694°N 73.795°E

Talawade is an industrial area in the Haveli taluka in Pimpri Chinchwad 411062 located near Pune in Maharashtra, India. It is a well developed industrial area with a large number of industries, and is the location of an information technology park.
