= Avinash Dharmadhikari =

Indian public servant, activist, and author

Founder, Director - Chanakya Mandal Pariwar
- In office 2001
- Prime Minister: Atal Bihari Vajpayee

Deputy secretary to the chief minister of Maharashtra
- In office 1995–96

Personal details
- Born: 2 August 1959 Kolhapur, Maharashtra, India
- Spouse: Poorna Dharmadhikari
- Children: Siddharth Dharmadhikari
- Education: Masters in Economics, Political Science, Sociology, M.Phil.
- Alma mater: University of Pune
- Occupation: ex-IAS officer, Educationist, Social Activist, Journalist, Author

Avinash Dharmadhikari is a former Indian Administrative Services officer. He was a well known social activist and free-lance journalist before joining IAS. After serving on various posts during his administrative career of ten years he resigned from IAS in 1996 for the reason that can be best described in Arun Shourie's words "to be able to serve Indian society better". He was Deputy Secretary to the Chief Minister of Maharashtra at the time of his resignation. He is founder and director of Chanakya Mandal Pariwar, working in the field of Career Guidance and Personality Development. He unsuccessfully contested for Lok Sabha as an independent candidate against Suresh Kalmadi. He was Director General of Nehru Yuva Kendra Sangathan in 2001 under Ministry of Sports and Youth Affairs, Government of India. As a social activist he has been part of many movements such as farmers' movements and movements against corruption. He was also a part of Team Anna during India against corruption movement. He has authored many books which includes 75 Soneri Pane, Aswastha Dashakachi Diary, Nava Vijaypath, Ek Vijaypath, Swatantra Nagarik, Jinkanara Samaj Ghadawanari Shikshanpadhhati, Aani Aapan Saglech, Ratra Gahirichya Tisarya Prahari(a collection of poems) . Aswastha Dashakachi Diary has been translated into English by Gauri Deshpande titled: Diary of a Decade of Agony.

== Early life ==
Avinash Dharmadhikari did his schooling from Jnana Prabodhini, Pune.

== Administrative career ==
He joined the IAS in 1986. During these ten years he had served on many posts such as – Sub-Divisional officer, Phaltan; Officer on Special Duty for state's Chief Secretary; Director, State Archives, Mumbai; CEO at Ratnagiri and Amaravati zilla parishads; Additional Collector, Pune; Director, Women and Child Welfare Dept, Maharashtra; District Collector, Raigad (Alibag); Deputy Secretary to Chief Minister, Maharashtra.

== Current occupation ==
After resigning from IAS in 1996, he founded Chanakya Mandal Pariwar, a network organization working in the field of Career Guidance, Competitive Exam (Civil Services Examination) Training, Entrepreneurship Building and Personality Development. On 31 December 2014, the 14th Dalai Lama inaugurated a new building of Chanakya Mandal Pariwar and lauded Avinash Dharmadhikari's commitment to serve the nation through youth education.

=== Politics ===
Dharmadhikari contested the Pune Lok Sabha seat in 1998 as an independent candidate and lost.

In March 2009, Dharmadhikari joined the Shiv Sena and remained a member until April 2011.

After Arvind Kejriwal, Yogendra Yadav and some other members separated from Anna Hazare to form the Aam Aadmi political party.In November 2012, Dharmadhikari joined the Team Anna movement against the then UPA-II government and proposed Jan Lokpal Bill
