= Nigdi =

- Neighbourhood
- Location in Maharashtra Nigdi (India) Nigdi (Asia)
- Coordinates: 18°37′07.04″N 73°48′13.43″E
- Country: India
- State: Maharashtra
- City: Pune
- Metro: Pune
- Elevation: 590 m (1,940 ft)
- Demonym(s): Punekar, Puneri, Puneite

Language
  - Official: Marathi, English
- Time zone: UTC+5:30 (IST)
- PIN: 411044
- Telephone code: +91-20
- Vehicle registration: Mh 14, Mh 12
- Governing Body: PCMC, Pune

Nigdi, also referred to as Nigdi-Pradhikaran or Pradhikaran-Nigdi, is an urbanised area of Pimpri-Chinchwad in Pune district, Maharashtra, India. It is a hub for administrative entities such as the Pimpri-Chinchwad Municipal Corporation (PCMC), which has offices there. Nigdi also has its own police station, as well as hospitals including the Lokmanya Hospital.

Bhakti Shakti, Nigdi is considered as the gateway to Pune. Nigdi is a well develop locality with property rates being high in and around Bhakti Shakti and in Pradhikaran localities. Nigdi is also home to Pimpri Chinchwad New Town Development Authority, GST bhavan, Kendriya Sadan - Pune CBI headquarters and many more. Nigdi is near Akurdi, Dehu road and Chinchwad railway station. There is a bus terminal at Bhakti Shakti, Nigdi where you get buses to every corner of the city. Luxury travels and State Transport buses are also easily available in Nigdi.

== Places of interest ==
- India's Tallest Flag Pole
- Ganesh Talav (lake)
- Durga Tekdi
- Appu Ghar
- Bhakti Shakti
- Sunset Point
- Dhingra Maidan
- Shri Krishna Temple
- Bhel Chowk
- Ganesh Talav

== Hospitals ==
- Lokmanya Hospital – Sector 24
- Sterling Multispecialty Hospital and Research Centre – Sector 27
- Diwan Hospital – Sector 24
- Apollo Clinic – Sector 25, Near Bhel Chowk
- Anand - Foresight Hospital – Sector 26
- Dhanwantari Hospital – Sector 27
- Ranna Hospital – Sector 21
- Kartik Hospital – Sector 27A, Opposite Ashoka Bus Stop
- Shakun Clinic Children's Hospital – Behind Nigdi bus stand
- Bhalerao ENT Hospital - Near Mahaslkant Chowk
- Ojas Multispeciality Hospital – sector 32 A, Ravet
- Shende Hospital – Sector 25
- Gandhi Nursing Home- Sector 24
- Panortho Hospital- Near Sambhaji Chowk

== Government Offices ==
- Kendriya Sadan, Nr. Akurdi Railway station
- CBI Pune HQ
- PMRDA Headquarter
- Pratyaksha Kar Bhavan (Income Tax Office), Akurdi Station Road.
- GST Bhavan, Akurdi Station Road.
- Zoological Survey Of India, Ravet Road.
- LIC Training Center
- PCMC 'A' Zone Office, Spine Road, Bhel Chauk.
- PCMC 'F' Zone Office, Tilak Road.
- Maha Vitaran Pradhikaran Sub-Division Office, Kachghar Chauk.
- PCMC Hedgewar Bhavan, Near Chhatrapati Shivaji Swimming Pool.
- Post office, Sector 26
- Civil Court, Sector 28
- Tehsildar Office, Sector 24
- Provident Fund Office, Sector 28.

== Schools and Colleges ==
- ATSS's Institute of Industrial and Computer Management & Research (IICMR - MCA & MBA)
- Amrita Vidyalayam School & College
- City Pride School
- City Pride Jr. College
- St Ursula's High School
- Jnana Prabodhini Navnagar Vidyalaya
- Shivbhumi vidhyalaya yamunanagar
- Kamalnayan Bajaj High School
- Trinity English High School
- Dheeraj International School
- Wunderbar Kids Pre School
- Kirti Vidyalaya
- Christeria High School
- Modern High School & College
- Mhalsakant Vidyalaya & College
- Guru Ganesh Vidyalaya
- Saraswati Vidyalaya
- Shrimati Kamladevi Govindseth Sable High School
- S.P.M. English Medium School
- Vidyanand Bhavan High School
- Dr. D.Y. Patil Center for Learning
- Camp Education Society's School & College
- Pimpri Chinchwad College of Engineering
- College of Ayurved and Research Center
- Smt. S. D. Ganage Prashala, Triveninagar
- St. Anns school, near Triveni Nagar.
- S.B. Patil Public School, Ravet
- ATSS College Chinchwad
- CMS School Nigdi
- Novel International School & College
- City Pride Jr. College
- Sanfort pre school
- Orchids International School
- D.I.C'S English Medium School
(Deccan Institute of Commerce)

== Transportation ==
Akurdi Railway Station of Pune Suburban Railway is in Sector-26 of Nigdi Pradhikaran. All local trains stops there. Nigdi is well connected to Pune City by buses leaving from Nigdi Bus terminal of Pune Mahanagar Parivahan Mahamandal Limited. There are PMPML buses available to Swargate, Kothrud, Hinjawadi, Katraj, Bhosari, Pune Station, Yerwada, Lonavala, Hadapsar, Wadgaon, Talegaon, Shirgaon etc. Mumbai Pune highway goes through Nigdi. Chinchwad Railway Station of Pune Suburban Railway is in Chinchwad near Nigdi.
