= Tata Steel Colors =

Joint venture between Tata Steel Limited and BlueScope Steel

- Formerly: Tata BlueScope Steel
- Type: Subsidiary
- Industry: Steel
- Founded: 2005
- Headquarters: Pune, India
- Number of locations: 4
- Area served: India
- Brands: Durashine, Ezybuild, Ecobuild
- Number of employees: 800
- Divisions: 28
- Website: tatasteelcolors.com

Tata Steel Colors Private Limited (formerly Tata BlueScope Steel) is an Indian steel manufacturing company and a wholly-owned subsidiary of Tata Steel. Originally established in 2005 as a joint venture between Tata Steel and BlueScope Steel, it transitioned to full Tata Steel ownership in December 2025. It is headquartered in Pune.

== History ==
Tata BlueScope Steel venture was established in 2005 with three major businesses: Coated Steel, Roof & Wall Cladding Products and Pre-engineered Building Solutions. Tata BlueScope Steel is headquartered in Pune and has its manufacturing units in Jamshedpur, Sriperumbudur, Bhiwadi and Pune. Tata BlueScope Steel has an annual metallic coating capacity of 250,000 tons and colour coating capacity of 150,000 tons.

On November 12, 2025, Tata Steel signed an agreement to acquire BlueScope's remaining 50% stake in the joint venture for approximately ₹1,100 crore. The transaction was officially completed on December 31, 2025. Following this acquisition, the company became a fully-owned subsidiary of Tata Steel and was subsequently rebranded as Tata Steel Colors.
