= Pashan Lake =

Artificial lake

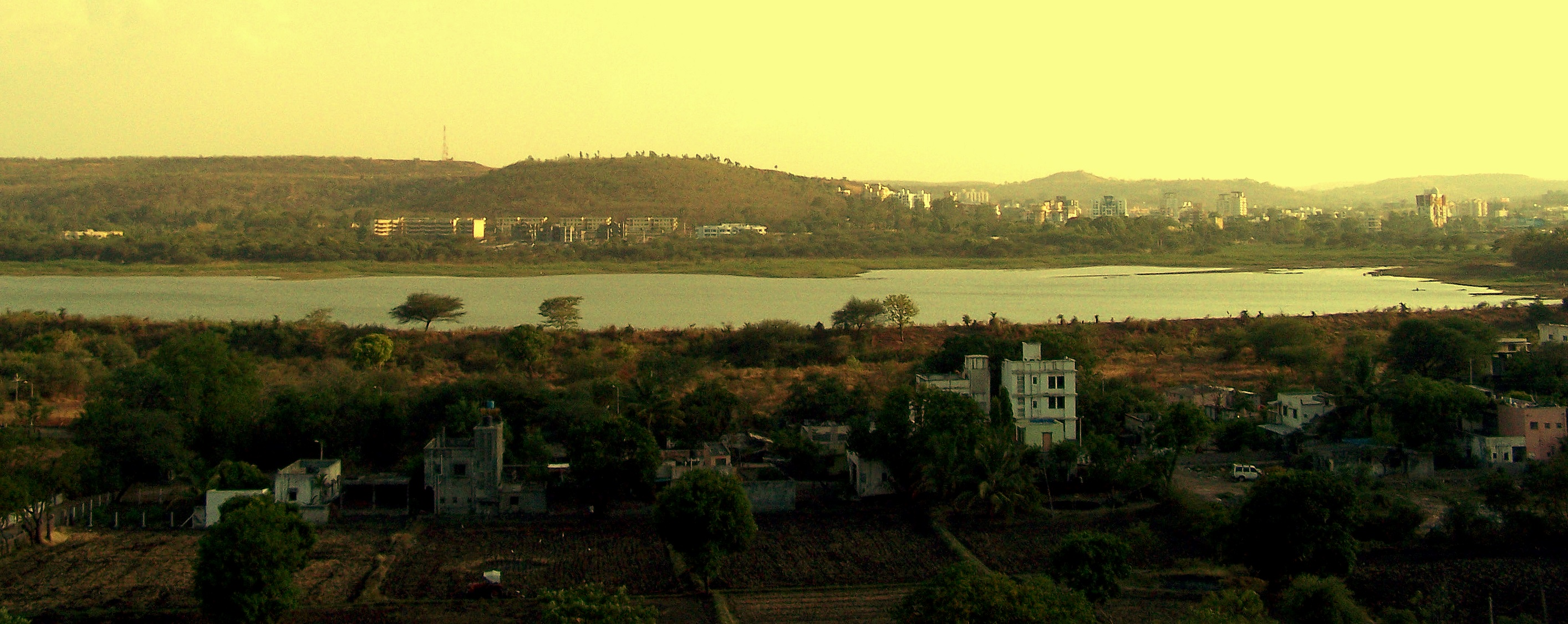
- Pashan Lake

- Location within Maharashtra
- Location: Pashan, Pune, India
- Coordinates: 18.533752°N 73.785717°E
- Type: Artificial
- Primary inflows: Ramnadi
- Primary outflows: Ramnadi
- Catchment area: 40 square kilometres (15 sq mi)
- Basin countries: India
- Max. length: 1.2 km (0.75 mi)
- Max. width: 0.7 km (0.43 mi)
- Surface elevation: 589 m (1,932 ft)
- Settlements: Pune

Pashan Lake is an artificial lake near the suburb of Pashan, about 12 km from the city center of Pune, India. The lake was built in the British era to accommodate the water requirement of the neighbourhood. The main inlet of the lake is the Ramnadi river, which is even controlled by a barrage located to the north of the lake. The river originates from Bavdhan and flows via Pashan, Sutarwadi, Baner to Someshwarwadi before flowing into the main Mula river. Pashan lake has a total catchment area of 40 square kilometres (15 sq mi), and serves as a source of water to the old Pashan village, and the governor's residence, as well. Recent urbanisation around the lake has led to the fall in the quality of the water.

Pashan Lake is an ideal spot for nature lovers and bird watchers. It offers a scenic environment ideal for morning walks and casual picnics. Pashan lake, like many urban lakes, faces challenges related to pollution.

== History ==
Pashan lake is a man-made lake, built to accommodate the water requirements of the Pashan and Sutarwadi suburbs. The lake was once a source of drinking water, but the recent boom in urbanisation and silting of the lake has degraded the water and made it unfit for drinking. The lake served as a source of water to old Pashan village, for growing crops and to the nearby governor's house. The lake and its surrounding area attracts migratory birds and so is popular spot for bird watchers. Pune Municipal Corporation (PMC) has constructed a 300-metre footpath called the Nature Trail alongside the lake. It is constructed along the western shore of Pashan lake. Also, PMC has built a bamboo plantation and a wall alongside the lake to protect it and attract birds.

== Environmental concerns ==
Recently, deforestation on nearby hills has caused heavy silt formation resulting in decrease in the depth of the lake. Ipomea weed is also cited as a major cause of lake's deterioration as it prohibits the growth of other plants. Also washing of trucks in the area contributes to the pollution by adding oil and petrol to the sewage. PMC estimates that 40,000 people could be provided with drinking water at per capita cost of ₹250 (US$2.60) as compared with the existing per capita cost of ₹1,500 (US$16).

The water quality deteriorated fast as the quantity of sewage water and other effluents mixing in the water kept rising. PMC worked towards improving the filtration plant but water quality remained poor. In 1998, Pune Municipal Corporation discontinued providing drinking water from the lake. However, now the lake is being studied for providing potable water again. During the financial year 2004–2005 PMC spent ₹10 million (US$100,000) for de-silting Pashan and Katraj lakes. Reactivation of Pashan purification plant is also under PMC consideration.
