= Baner-Pashan Biodiversity Park =

- Biodiversity Park
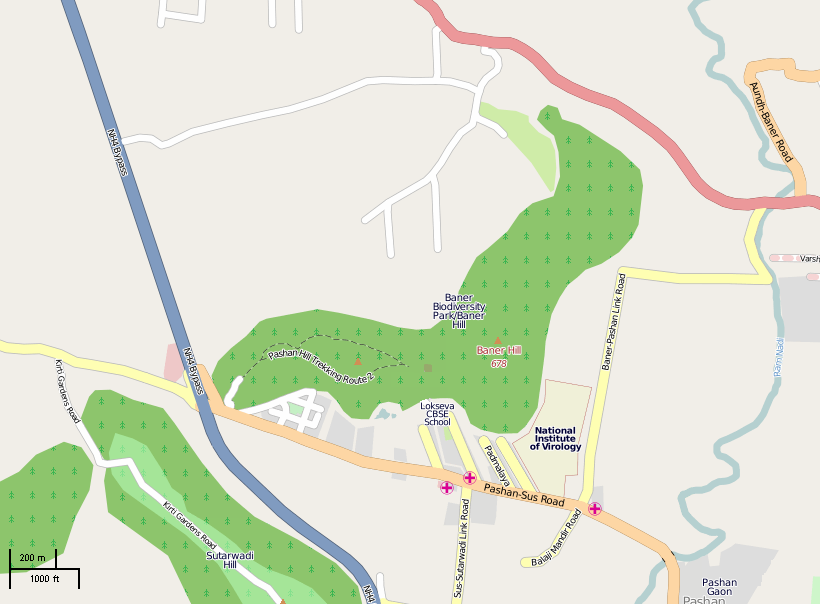
- Map of Baner-Pashan Biodiversity Park

- Location in Maharashtra, India
- Coordinates: 18°32′52″N 73°47′00″E
- Country: India
- State: Maharashtra
- District: Pune District, Maharashtra

Area
  - Total: 2 km^{2} (0.77 sq mi)
- Elevation: 678 m (2,224 ft)

Languages
  - Official: Marathi
- Time zone: UTC+5:30 (IST)
- Nearest city: Pune
- Governing body: Pune Municipal Corporation

The Baner-Pashan Biodiversity Park is a proposed 200 hectare protected region currently under development in the Baner and Pashan suburbs of Pune, India by the Pune Municipal Corporation. The park is being constructed to protect the biodiversity near and around the Baner Hill and its spur, the Pashan Hill.

== History ==
Pune witnessed a large scale development in Infrastructure in the 2000s. As a result, the Baner and Pashan suburbs were directly affected due to their close proximity to the IT Park. The Pashan area covers about 91% of the hilly area of the city. So, there is a potential of these hills to be used as the green lungs of the city.

The PMC, supported by the State Government is developing a park over here due to this reason.

== Location ==
The Location of the park is over a 200 hectare land on the hills of Pashan:

=== Baner Hill ===
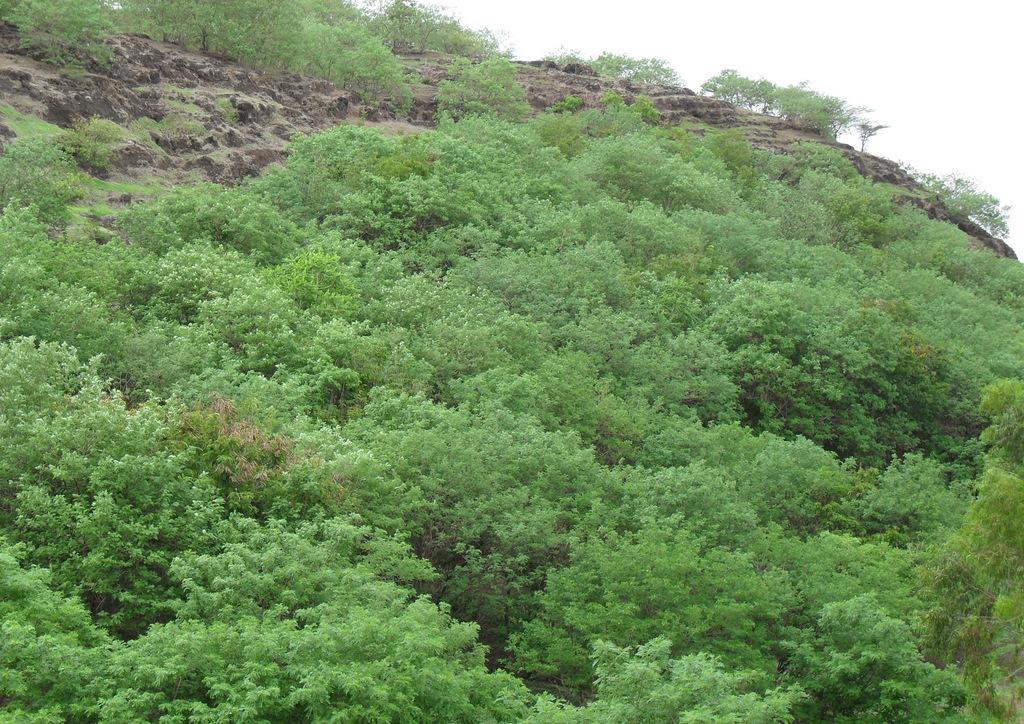
Baner Hill in Monsoon

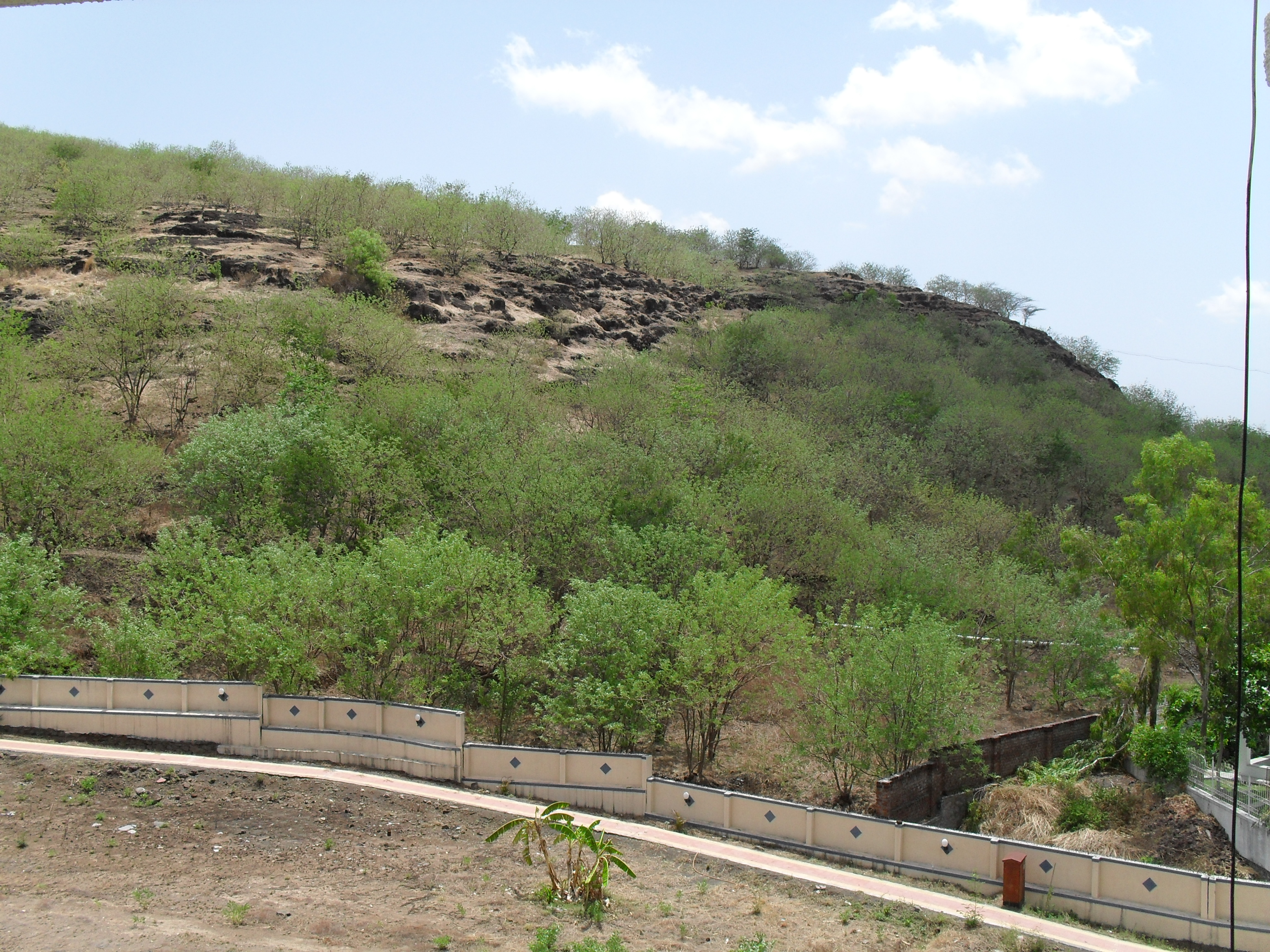
Baner Biodiversity Park

Baner hill is a hill that separates two suburbs of Pune, Pashan and Baner. The hill is the third highest point within the city limits, with an elevation of 678 m, surpassed by the Vetal Hill and the Surtarwadi Hill. The place is actually the home for a plantation drive that has been taken up enthusiastically by the locals, helped by numerous volunteers. One can see people coming up early in the morning every Sunday and working in groups to make the place greener. However, there are multiple instances of tree felling, cutting of branches, setting fire to the dry grass in summers which are a constant threat to the flora and fauna on the hills. The hills are not secured by any proper fencing, nor are there any security staff of the Pune Municipal Corporation, therefore many miscreants ravage the flora, also anti social elements use the site for drinking / gambling illegal activities.

=== Pashan Hill ===
Pashan hill is the spur of Baner Hill, with an elevation of 660 m. The plantation drive also takes place here. It is a great spot of birdwatchers and for picnics. The hill currently hosts various water supply tanks used by volunteers for watering plants. Similar problems of tree cutting, miscreants using the hills for drinking, illegal activities are affecting the security and sanctity of these hills as these are not fenced properly or guarded by the officials.
