= Ramnadi =

River in India

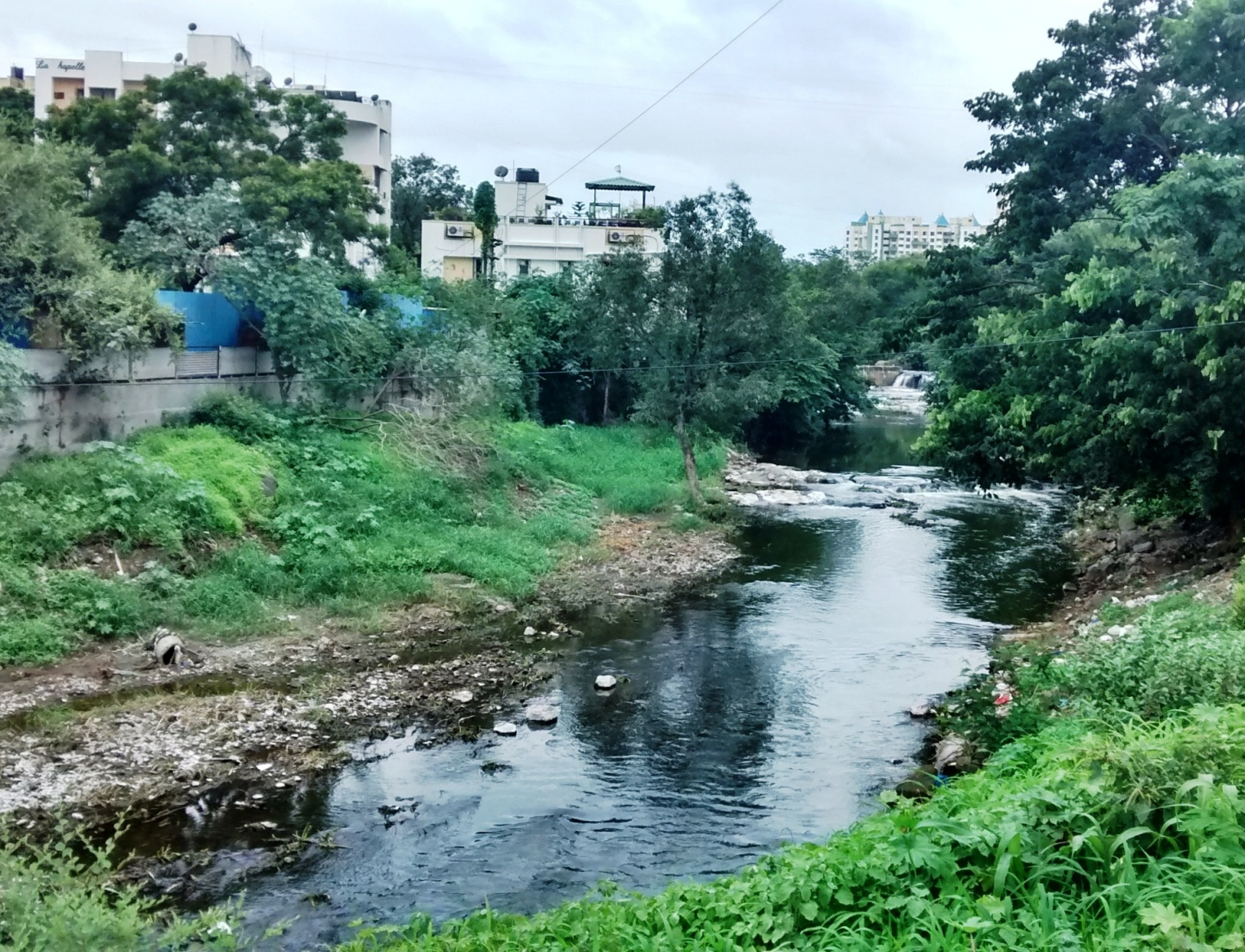
- The Ramnadi at Baner

Location
- Country: India
- State: Maharashtra
- City: Pune

Physical characteristics
- Source: Sahyadri Range
  - location: near Kathpewadi
  - elevation: 957 m
- Mouth: Mula River
  - elevation: 550 m
- Length: 19.2 km
- Basin size: 181.65 km^{2}

Basin features
- Waterbodies: Khatpewadi Lake, Pashan Lake, Manas lake

The Ramnadi is a river in Pune District and is a tributary of the Mula. It originates in the Sahyadris near Khatpewadi, north-west of Pune city. The river flows through the Bhugaon, Bhukum, Bavdhan, Pashan, Baner and Aundh areas of Pune city. It is defined as a brook by the Pune Municipal Corporation (PMC).

The width of the river channel has decreased due to illegal constructions and dumping of construction debris. These constructions are yet to be removed. Many rallies have been held to save the river. However, it has been turned into a sewage canal due to dumping of garbage on its banks. Many local residents are in fact unaware of the river's existence. Due to the river's deteriorating condition, the PMC has undertaken a project to beautify this river. The proposal includes development of a garden along the banks of the river.

The Pashan Lake and Manas lake are the major water bodies on the river basin.

== Watershed ==
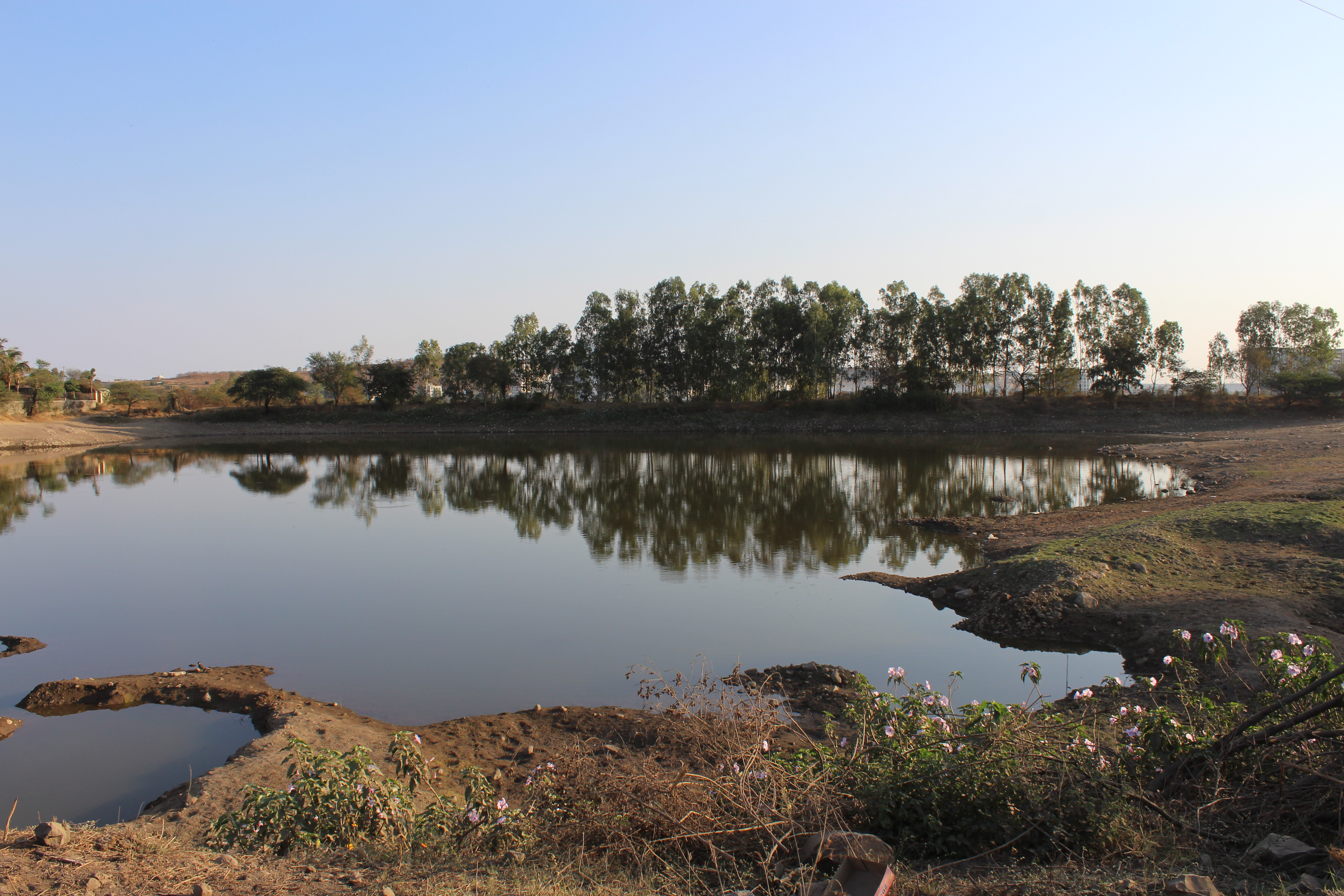
Khatpewadi Lake, the source of the Ramnadi

The river originates in the Western Ghats at an elevation of 957 m above sea level. It then flows in the north-west direction eventually merging with the Mula River at an elevation of 550 m. The villages Bhukum, Bhugaon and Pirangut along with the Bavdhan, Aundh, Pashan and Karvenagar suburbs of Pune lie in the Ramnadi watershed. Major water bodies on the river basin are Pashan Lake and Manas lake both of which are man-made.

The Jarseshwar Temple, Rameshwar Temple, Wakeshwar Temple, Someshwar Temple are historical temples located on the banks of the river.

== Flooding ==
=== History ===
- In 2011 heavy monsoon rains led to flooding on its banks in the low lying Bavdhan, Pashan, Aundh and Baner areas of Pune. Protest by residents followed which demanded that the PMC look into taking flood control measures along the river. In response a joint survey by the PMC and District Administration was taken to list out encroachments along the river bank and channel.
- In 2019 heavy monsoon rains led to flooding on the river's banks mainly in the Aundh-Baner region of Pune, over 2,000 people were evacuated during the aftermath.

=== Causes ===
Activists and experts believe the floods to be a result of decreased water carrying capacity of the river. Encroachment and illegal constructions have decreased the width of the river channel and reduced its water carrying capacity. These illegal constructions are yet to be removed. The construction of a retaining wall along the river channel by the PMC has allowed for reclamation of land in the flood plain for construction activities. The lack of a proper flood line demarcation has further allowed for constructions in the flood plain. This has reduced the channel area by almost 15%. Construction debris and sewage deposition have obstructed the natural flow of the river.

The Ramnadi is fed by around 416 streams out of which 106 no longer exist. Most of them have been destroyed as a result of construction and encroachment activities. This has destroyed the natural catchment area. Together these factors have made the areas surrounding the river flood prone.

== Restoration ==
Years of unchecked dumping of trash, as well as illegal encroachments on the banks of the river, has nearly destroyed its ecosystem. Hence it has sparked several restoration projects led by environmental activists as well as concerned citizens over the years.

=== Ramnadi Restoration Mission ===
The Ramnadi Restoration Mission (RRM) is one of the biggest river restoration projects in Pune, involving nearly 15,000 students from 38 colleges, 25 schools and 18 city-based environmental groups, local politicians and residents. It aims to restore the river to at least its state in 1949 (70 years prior). It official started on June 4, 2019. The mission has youth at the heart of its efforts. “We believe that school children are the strongest catalyst between the RRM and the society. In our initiative, we have adopted 1.5 lakh students. When we teach them, they in turn educate their families about the cause.”, says Virēndra Citrav, coordinator of the mission. The 19.2 km long river has been divided into nine stretches of around 2 km each. Each stretch has been allotted to three local colleges, who will carry out the mission's 40-point program designed to form a bond between the students and the river. Activities include cleaning the water body, natural farming, workshops on film-making, and competitions like elocution, photography and painting. Students are encouraged to create artifacts from garbage retrieved during river cleanup.

At the same time, environmental groups in the RRM address the more fundamental aspects of restoration. Phase 1 of the project involves the rejuvenation of Khatpewadi lake. Removal of silt from the water body will help increase its capacity, the silt will be used to reduce the gradient of its banks. Plantation of trees along the bank will also be done. Construction of artificial islands in the lake is also being considered to provide ample space for migratory birds to nest and rest. Phase 1 is expected to span over a period of 3 years. Initial restoration efforts part of Phase 1, resulted in a 25% increase in the water sustaining capacity of the Khatpewadi lake. In February 2022, the RRM announced its plan to convert the lake into a lotus lake. Led by Saṅjay Gurav, a fine arts teacher from Khāmgāv in Vidarbha, the efforts are expected to enhance the health of the water near the source of the Ramnadi.

Experts and environmentalist working with the Ramnadi Restoration Mission prepared a report titled "Ramnadi Flood Report" which analysed the unprecedented flooding of the river during the 2019 monsoon. Key points included loss of tree cover and encroachment by buildings and strongly emphasised the need for flood mapping. The report was submitted to the Pune Municipal Corporation (PMC).

In June 2021, the PMC "agreed in principle" to set up a dedicated committee to streamline the restoration efforts of the RRM. PMC commissioner Vikram Kumar approved the demand to prepare an independent development plan for Ramnadi and invite the representatives of the NGOs to be part of the committee, with the mayor as the chairman. The gram panchayats of Bhukum and Bhugaon have taken action to show their support for the efforts of the RRM - in April 2022, they issued notices to the PMC and the Maharashtra Pollution Control Board (MPCB) to halt excavation work for a garbage collection facility that falls too close to Ramnadi's floodlines.
