= Bavdhan =

- Western Suburb of Pune
- Location in Maharashtra, India
- Coordinates: 18°32′7″N 73°46′58″E
- Country: India
- State: Maharashtra
- District: Pune District

Government
  - Body: Pune Municipal Corporation
- Elevation: 570 m (1,870 ft)

Population
  - Total: 2.5 lakhs

Languages
  - Official: Marathi
- Time zone: UTC+5:30 (IST)
- Postal code: 411021
- Vehicle registration: MH-12
- Lok Sabha constituency: Baramati (Lok Sabha constituency)
- Civic agency: Pune Municipal Corporation

Bavdhan is a residential suburb situated in the southwestern part of Pune, in the Indian state of Maharashtra.

== Description ==
Bavdhan is situated within the Khadakwasla Vidhan Sabha constituency and is represented by two ward representatives in the Pune Municipal Corporation. The suburb features numerous residential apartments and societies. Additionally, it offers various amenities such as clinics, ATMs, medical shops, restaurants, garden hotels, petrol pumps, temples, grocery stores, and general shops.

== Transportation ==
Bavdhan is connected to Kothrud, Paud Road, Baner, Aundh, Pashan, Pune University, and Sus via roads.

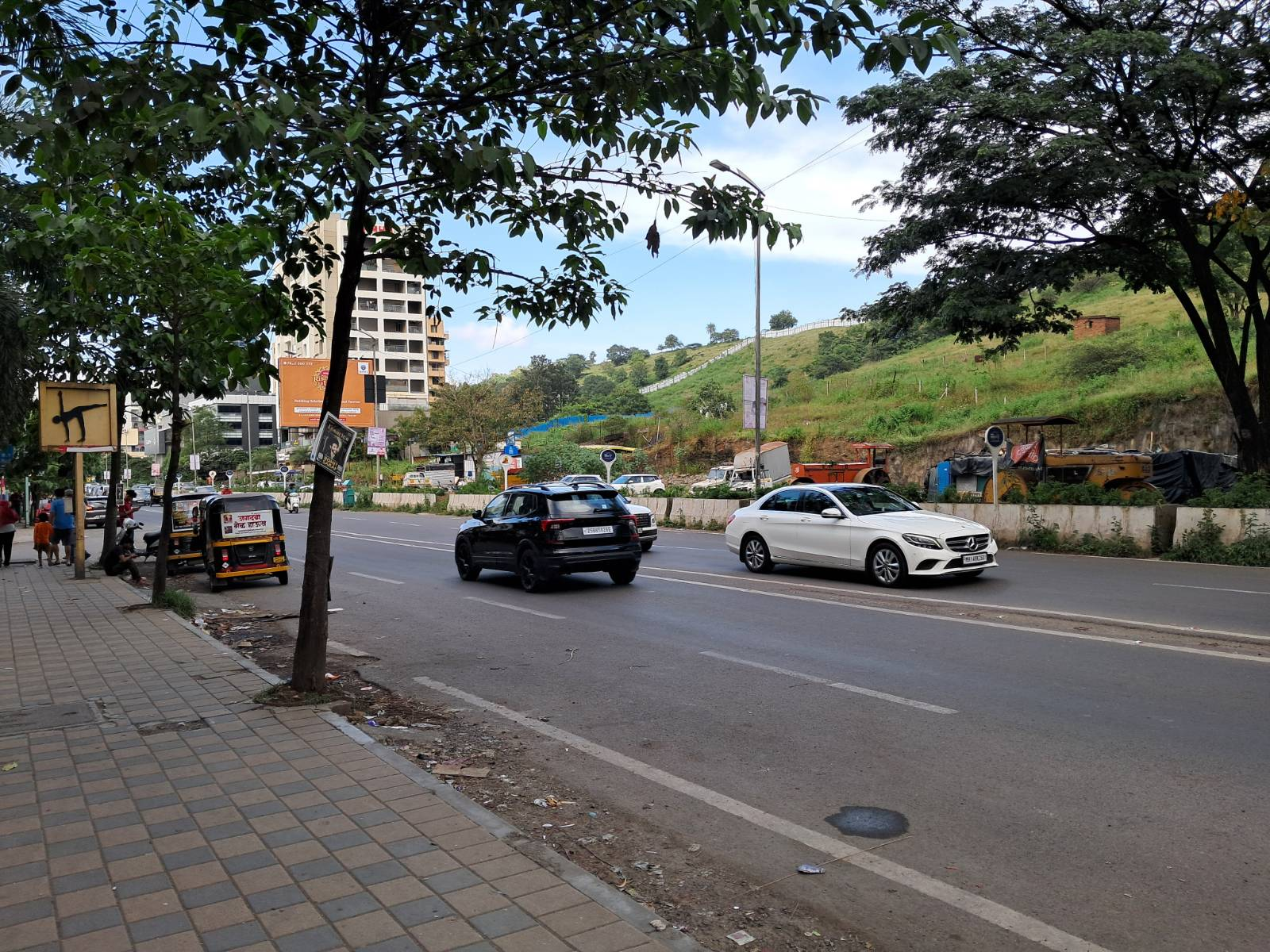
NDA-Pashan road in Bavdhan

The Shivaji Nagar railway station is about 10 km away (30 mins), the Pune Junction railway station is about 14 km (40-45 mins) away and the Pune airport about 22 km away (60-75 mins).

Direct buses are available from Bavdhan to Pune Municipal Corporation, University Circle, Hinjawadi, Pashan Circle, Kothrud, Karve road, Deccan Gymkhana, Marketyard and Pune Station.

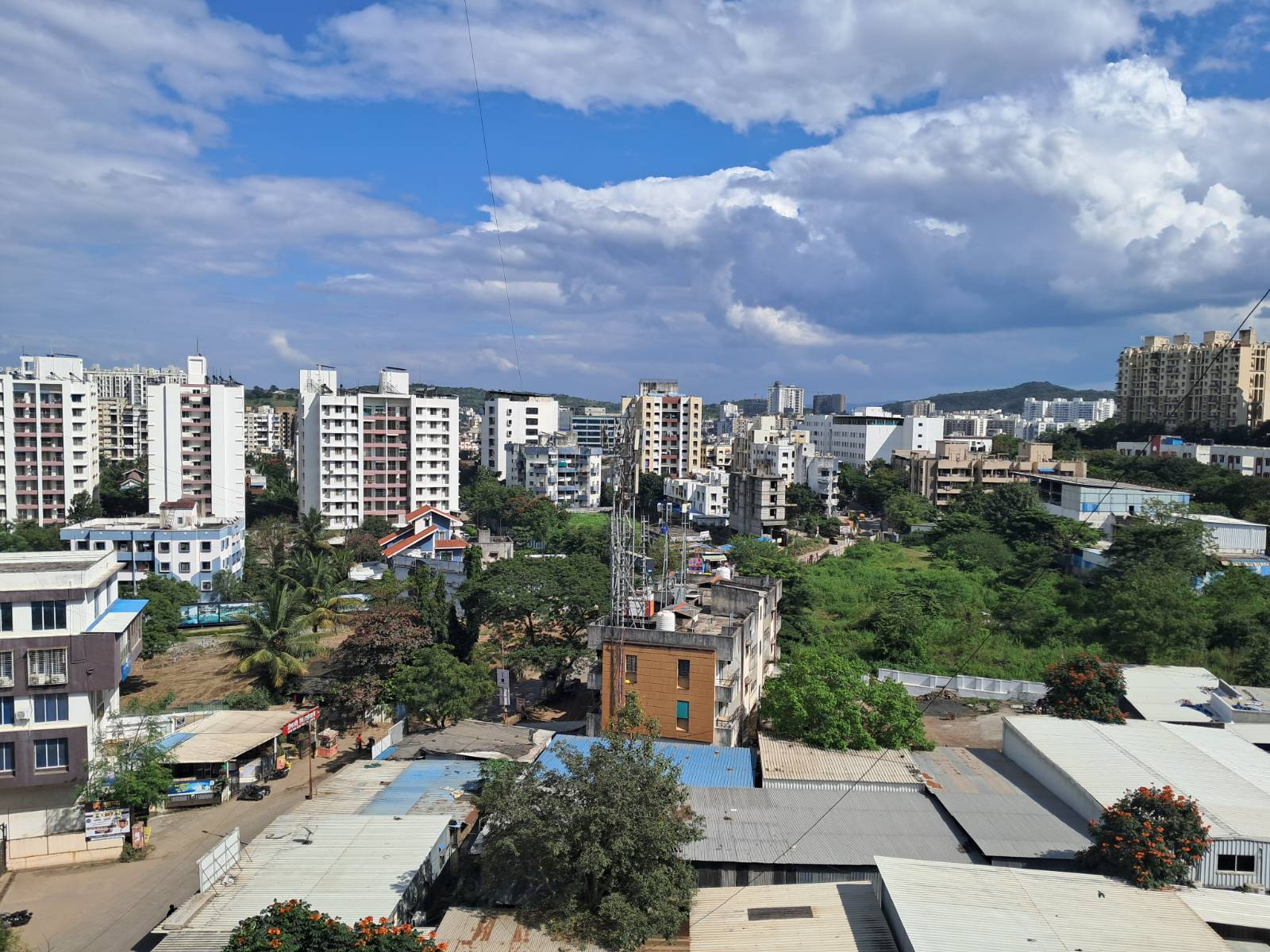
Bavdhan Skyline as seen from Bavdhan Budruk side
