= Pashan =

Neighbourhood in Pune District, Maharashtra, India

- Neighbourhood
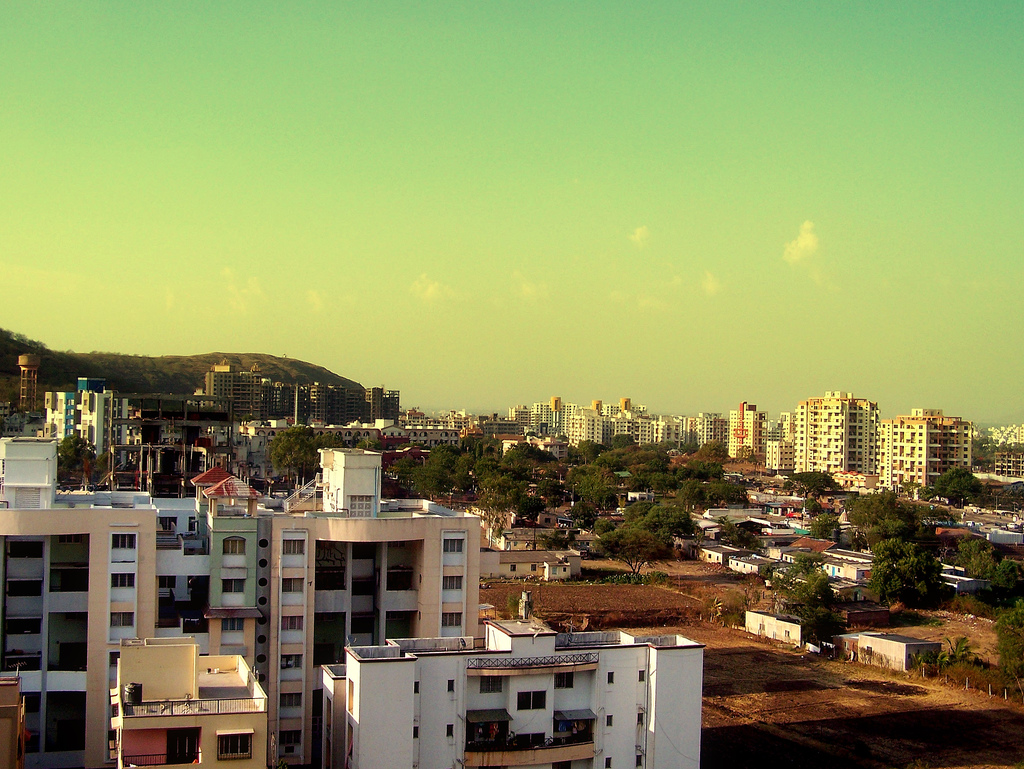
- Hillock behind residential apartments is a protected biodiversity park.

- Location in Maharashtra, India
- Coordinates: 18°32′7″N 73°46′58″E
- Country: India
- State: Maharashtra
- District: Pune district

Government
  - Body: Pune Municipal Corporation
- Elevation: 570 m (1,870 ft)

Languages
  - Official: Marathi
- Time zone: UTC+5:30 (IST)
- Lok Sabha constituency: Pune (Lok Sabha constituency)
- Civic agency: Pune Municipal Corporation

Pashan is suburb of Pune, India. It is located off the Mumbai-Bangalore national highway, by-passing Pune city. Pashan road serves as the main approach road for Mumbai-Pune expressway. Pashan is bordered by Baner in north, Sus on west, Bavdhan in south and Pune University in east. It was majorly developed by the D R Kulhalli Company. Pashan is mostly a residential suburb of Pune and large portions are occupied by various governmental and educational institutions. In October 2019, Pashan received more rainfall than the wettest place on Earth.

== Etymology ==
Pashan literally means rock or stone in Sanskrit and local Marathi language.

== Administration ==
Pashan is part of the Kothrud (Vidhan Sabha constituency). It has two ward representatives in Pune Municipal Corporation.

== Pashan Lake ==
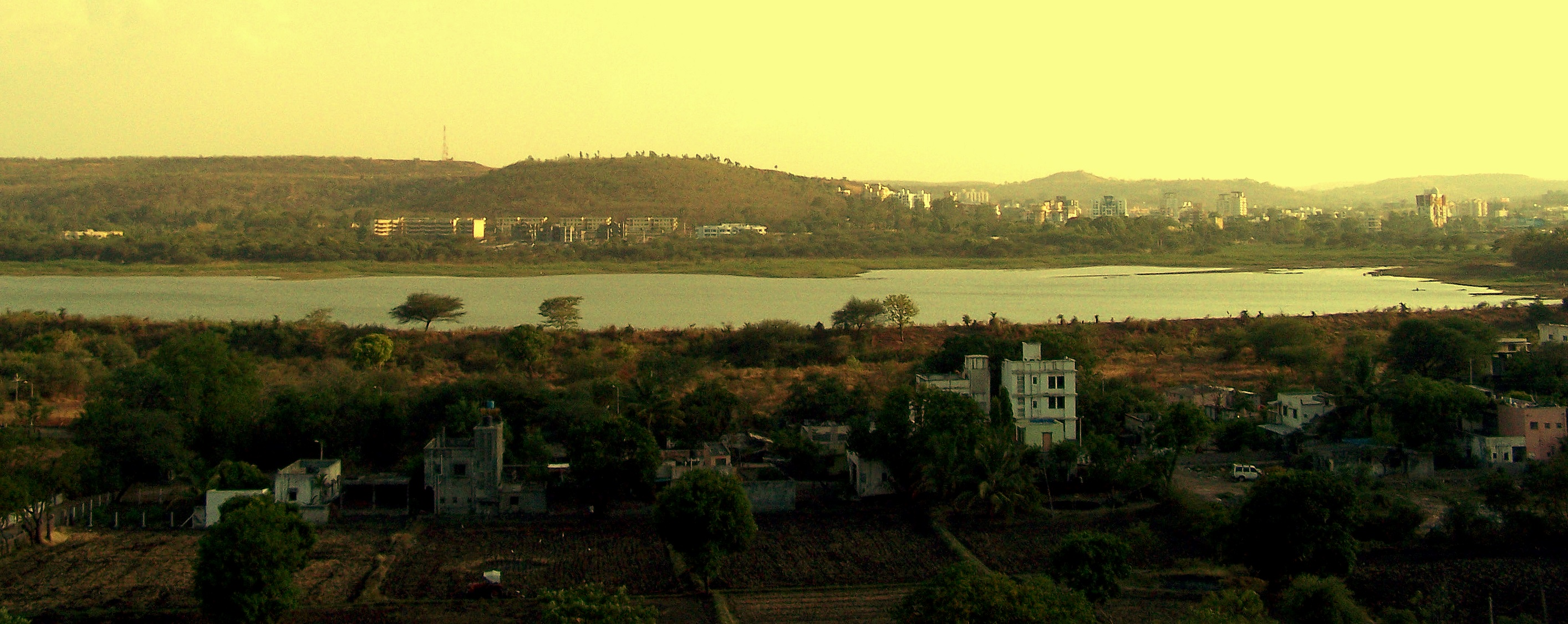
Panoramic view of the lake

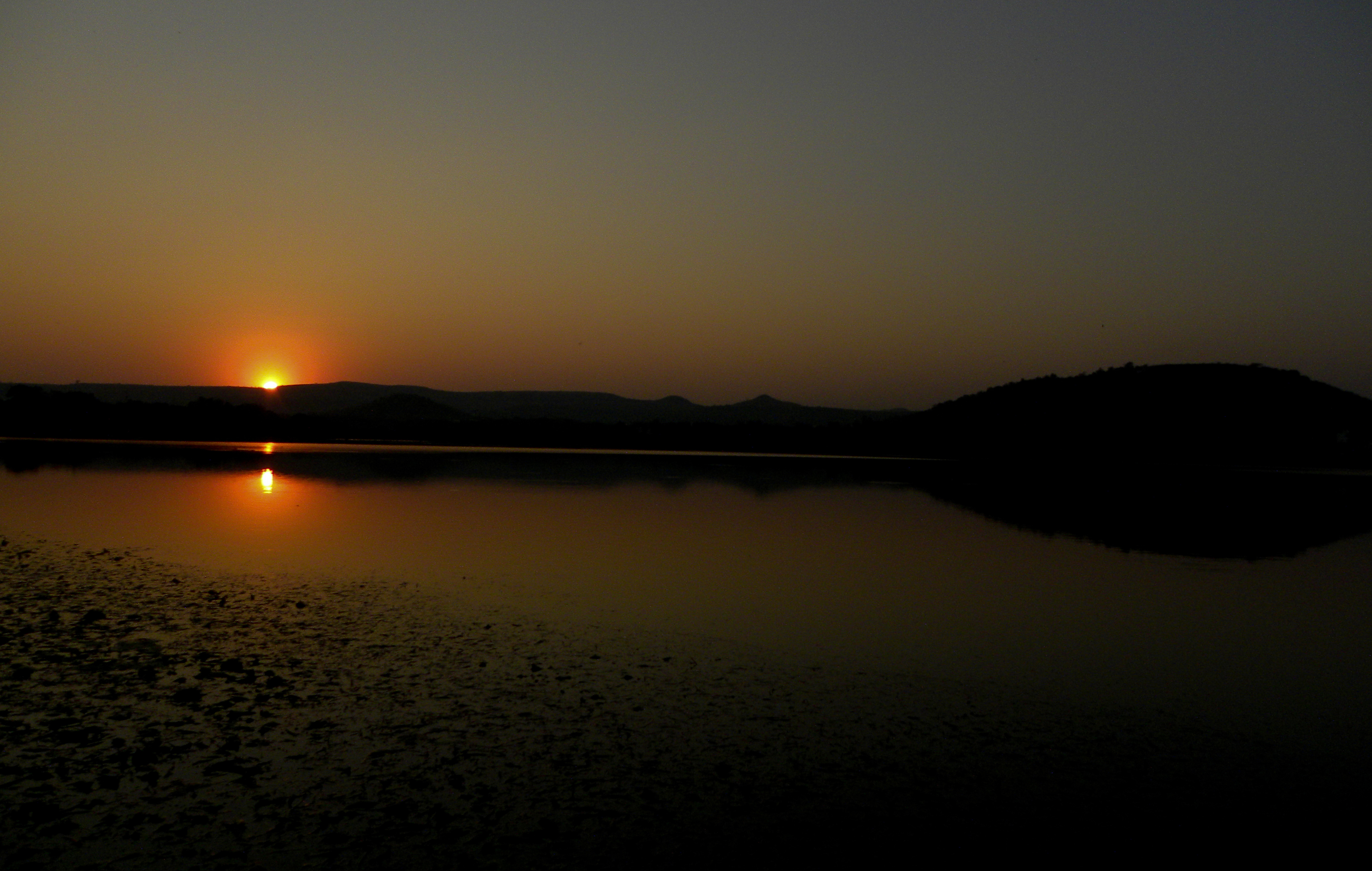
Sunset at pashan lake

Pashan lake is a manmade lake, built by bunding a small river (Ramnadi). The river originates from Bavdhan and flows via Pashan, Sutarwadi, Baner to Someshwarwadi before flowing into the main Mula river. The total catchment area is 40 square kilometres (15 sq mi). Lake served as a source of water to old Pashan village, for growing crops all the year round and to nearby Governor's house. Lake and its surrounding area attracts migratory birds and so is popular spot for bird watchers. Pune Municipal Corporation (PMC) has constructed a 300-metre footpath called the nature trail alongside the lake. It is constructed along the western shore of Pashan lake. Also, PMC has built a bamboo plantation and wall alongside the lake to protect it and attract birds. Within municipal limits of Pune city, Pashan has the maximum hill area of 5111.89 hectors (excluding 23 fringe villages).

The Baner – Pashan Biodiversity Park has also been proposed by the PMC. The land of 200 hectors is owned by state government and runs along Baner Hill. The hill has variable flat and dome shaped topography much of which is formed by rocky, strata with a small layer of soil.

=== Environmental concerns ===
Recently, deforestation on nearby hills has caused heavy silt formation resulting in decrease in the depth of the lake. Ipomea weed is also cited as a major cause of lake's deterioration as it prohibits the growth of other plants. Also washing of trucks in the area contributes to the pollution by adding oil and petrol to the sewage. PMC estimates that 40,000 people could be provided with drinking water at per capita cost of ₹250 (US$2.70) as compared with the existing per capita cost of ₹1,500 (US$16).

The water quality deteriorated fast as the quantity of sewage water and other effluents mixing in the water kept rising. PMC worked towards improving the filtration plant but water quality remained poor. In 1998, Pune Municipal Corporation discontinued providing drinking water from the lake. However, now the lake is being studied for providing potable water again. During the financial year 2004–2005 PMC spent ₹10 million (US$110,000) for de-silting Pashan and Katraj lakes. Reactivation of Pashan purification plant is also under PMC consideration.

== People and culture ==
Balaji Mandir, a Hindu temple of Lord Balaji, is located at main intersection of village. Temple is maintained by Sri Ahobila Mutt trust. The temple construction began in 1998 and temple was consecrated in 2002. A lord Ganesha Mandir is situated aside the 'Vighnaharta Chowk' interchange. Someshwarwadi area has an old Shiva temple built at the time of Shivaji Maharaj. The temple is located on the banks of Ramnadi.

On 4 July 2008, a tree-planting drive was held ahead of the 2008 Commonwealth Youth Games. Pashan hosts a weekly vegetable market on Sundays.

Major regions of Pashan were developed by the D R Kulhalli Company, who, still to this day owns large amounts of land in the area.

== Transport ==
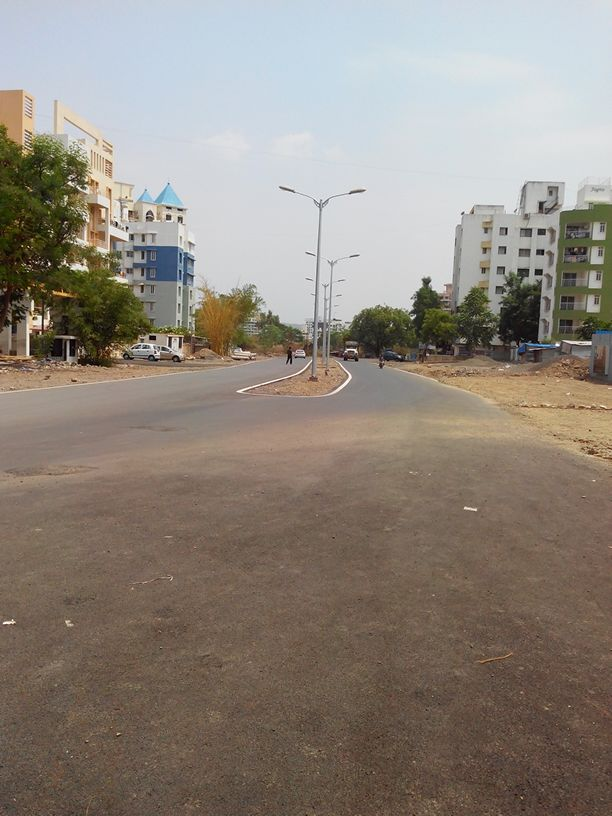
Paved second section of Baner-Pashan Link road from Rolling Hills to Magnolia via Crystal Garden

Pashan is well connected to Baner, Aundh, Bavdhan, University Square, Sus via excellent roads. The train station is about 10 km away (20 mins) and the airport about 15 km away (35–40 mins). Suttarwadi, Abhinav College and Pashan village are the major stops for PMPML buses that cater to passengers. Direct buses are available from these stops to Kothrud Depot, Hinjewadi, Deccan Gymkhana, Marketyard and Pune Station.

== Establishments ==
Pashan is home to numerous state government and central government establishments in Pune.

- Armament Research and Development Establishment (ARDE)
- Defence Research and Development Organisation (DRDO)
- High Energy Materials Research Laboratory)(HEMRL)
- National Chemical Laboratory (NCL)
- Indian Institute of Science Education and Research, Pune (IISER)
- National Institute of Virology (NIV)
- Centre for Materials for Electronics Technology (C-MET)
- High Energy Materials Research Laboratory (HEMRL)
- C-DAC Innovation Park
- Indian Institute of Tropical Meteorology (IITM)

Abhinav College of arts is an important educational institute in Pashan.
