= Sus, Pune =

Village in Maharashtra

Sus सुस, Sus Gaon
- Neighbourhood
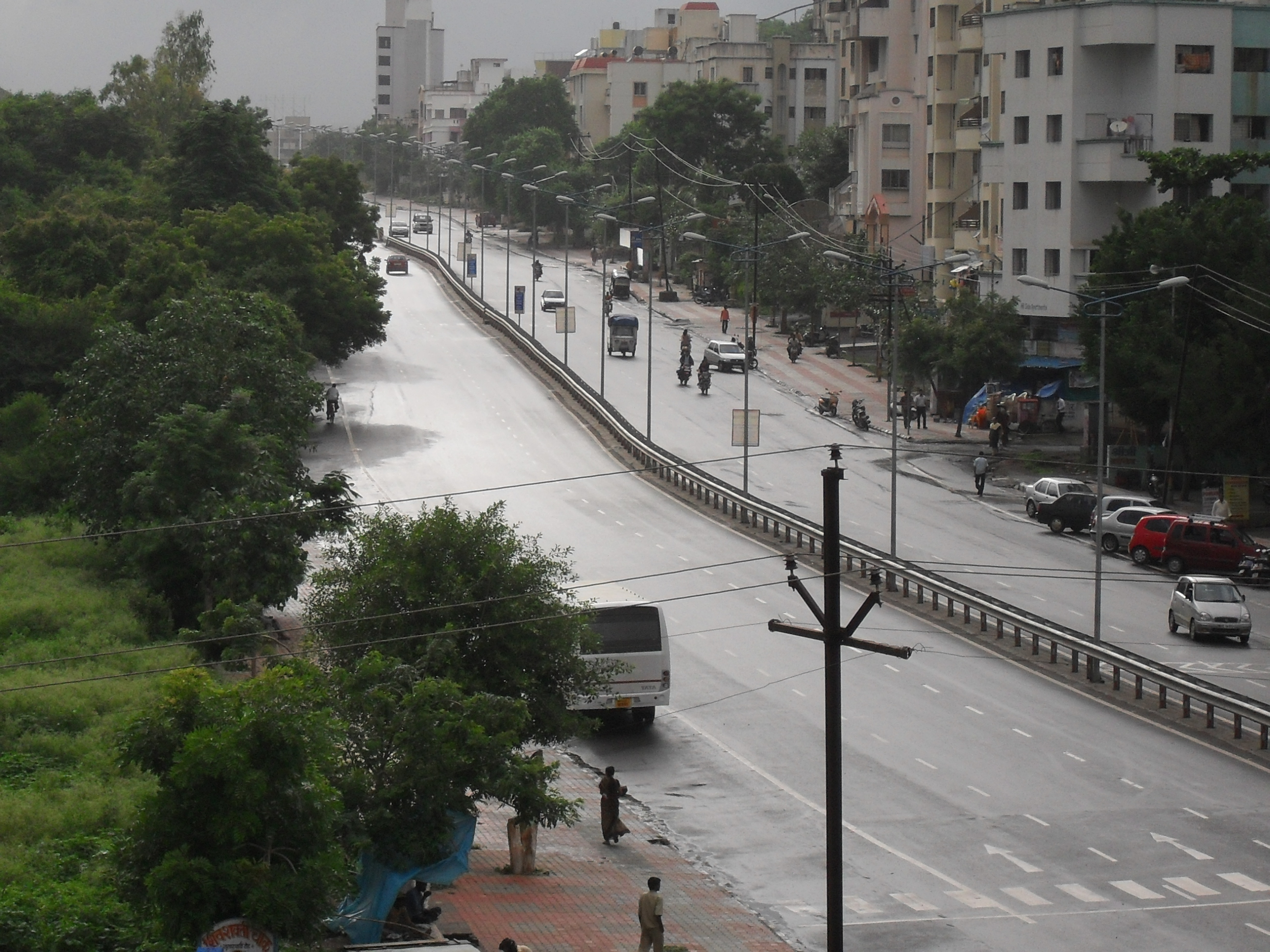
- The Pashan-Sus road in Sus

- Location in Maharashtra Location in India
- Coordinates: 18.5907721°N 73.8167953°E
- Country: India
- State: Maharashtra
- District: Pune district

Government
  - Body: Pune

Population (2018)
  - Total: 10,000

Languages
  - Official: Marathi
- Time zone: UTC+5:30 (IST)
- PIN: 411021
- Vehicle registration: MH12

Sus (pronounced SOOS) is a neighbourhood in the Pune Metropolitan Area. It is located in the southwest area of the city. Earlier a small village, Sus is being increasingly urbanized. The neighbourhood falls under the jurisdiction of the Pune Municipal Corporation.

Sus is well connected to important roads. The Deu Road–Katraj bypass is just off Sus, enabling easy connectivity to Pimpri-Chinchwad and the Mumbai–Pune Expressway. The Rajiv Gandhi InfoTech Park in Hinjawadi is about 13 km (8.1 mi) from Sus, making it a residential preference to people working in the Information Technology industry.

== History ==
Sus is a newly developed location after the expansion of Pune city limits in the late 1990s. Real estate in the area has increased in the past decade in order to meet the growing demand of residents.

== Geography and Climate ==
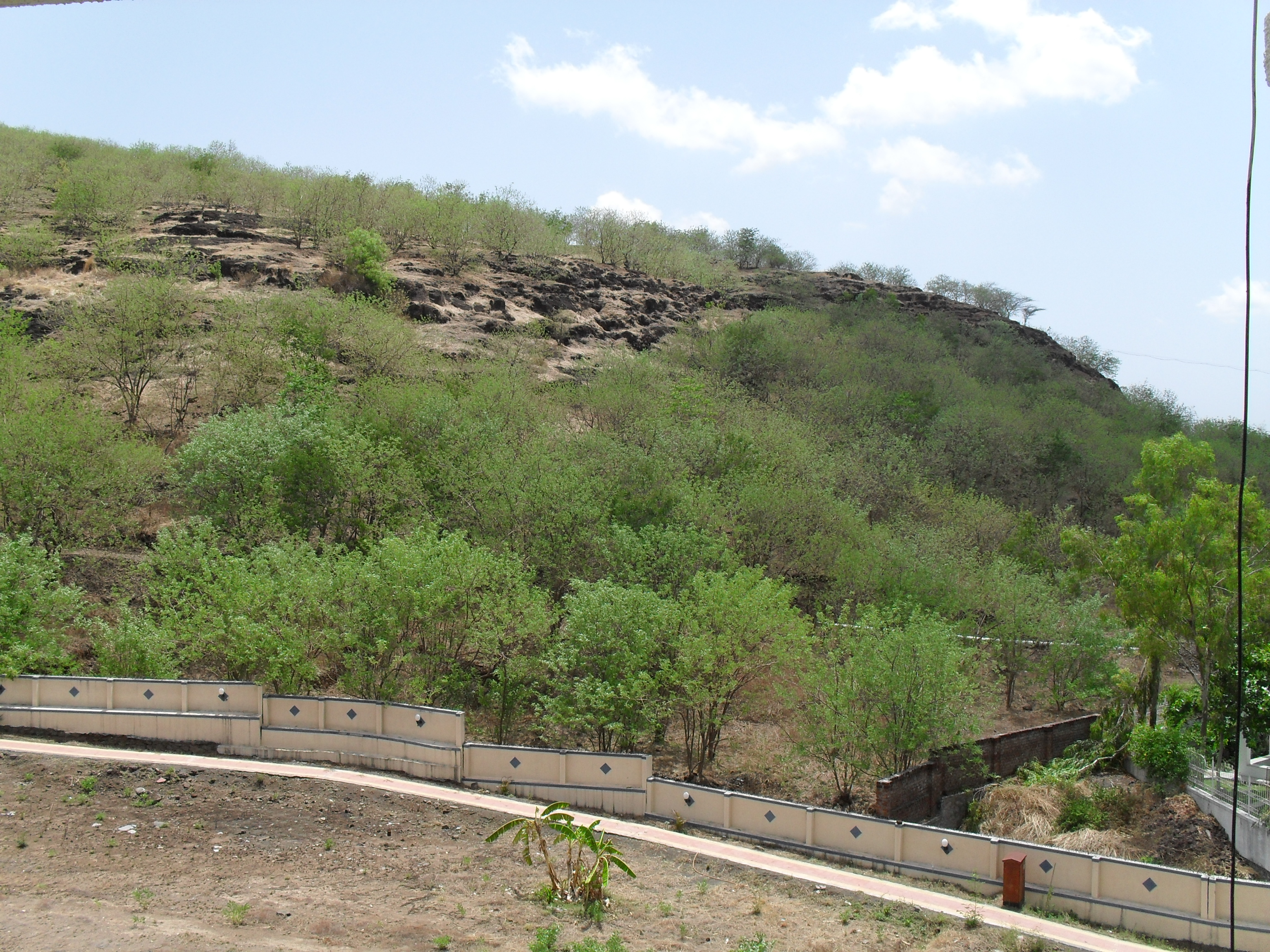
Baner Hill from Sus

Sus lies in a valley and is surrounded by hills both sides. The average elevation of the neighbourhood is 550 m (1,800 ft). Surrounding hills include the Baner Hill, Pashan Hill, Sutarwadi Hill and the Lavale Hills.

Sus shares the climate of Pune City, with warm summers, moderate rainfall and moderate winters.

== Education and Research ==
Due to the growth in population, many private schools have been set up in Sus and surroundings. Some notable schools include:

- Vidya Valley School - ICSE
- Tree House High School - ICSE
- Apple Blossom Nursery School
- Lokseva e-school

A number of colleges have been established in Sus.

- Abhinav College of Arts (ACR)
- Indian Institute of Science Education and Research (IISER)
- International School of Business and Media (ISBM)
- Maharashtra Institute of Technology - School of Distant Learning (MIT-SDL)
- Institute of Hospitality Management, Research & Development (IHMRD)
- Symbiosis Institute of Technology (SIT)
- Foundation of Liberal and Management Education (FLAME)

== Gallery ==
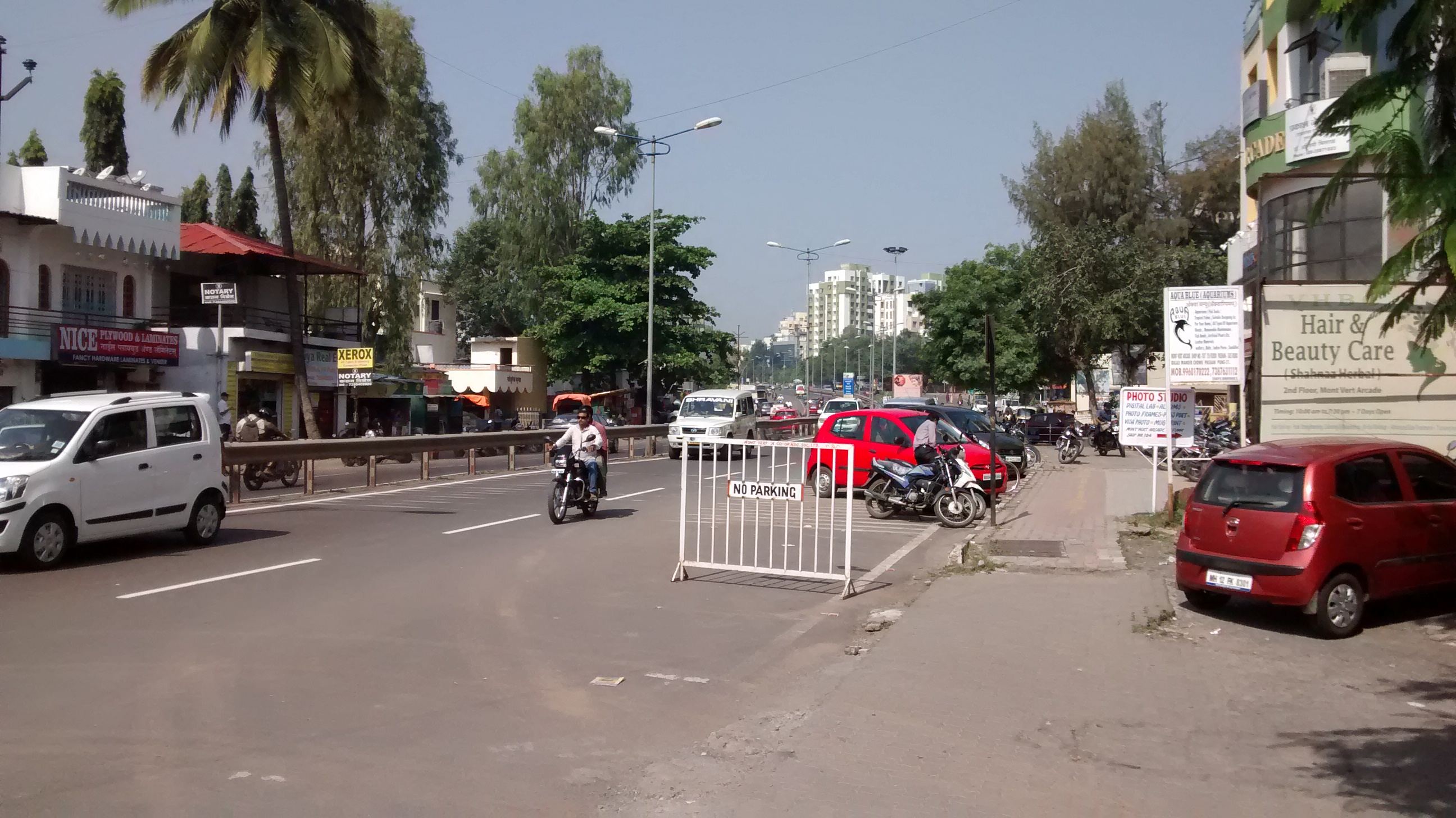
New Sus Road

New Sus Road

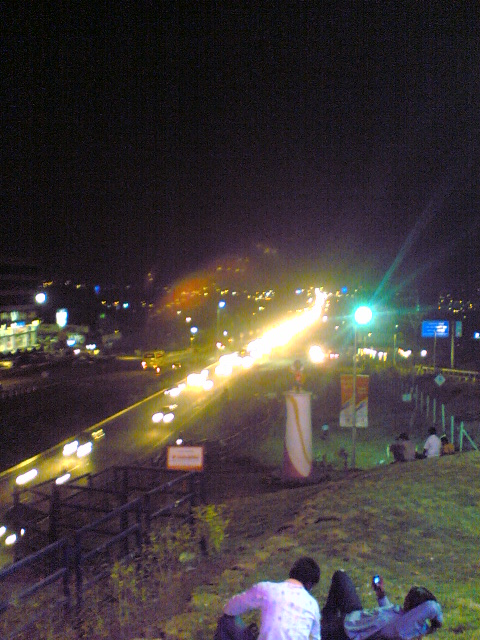
Bypass near Sus Road
