= Baner =

- Western Suburb of Pune
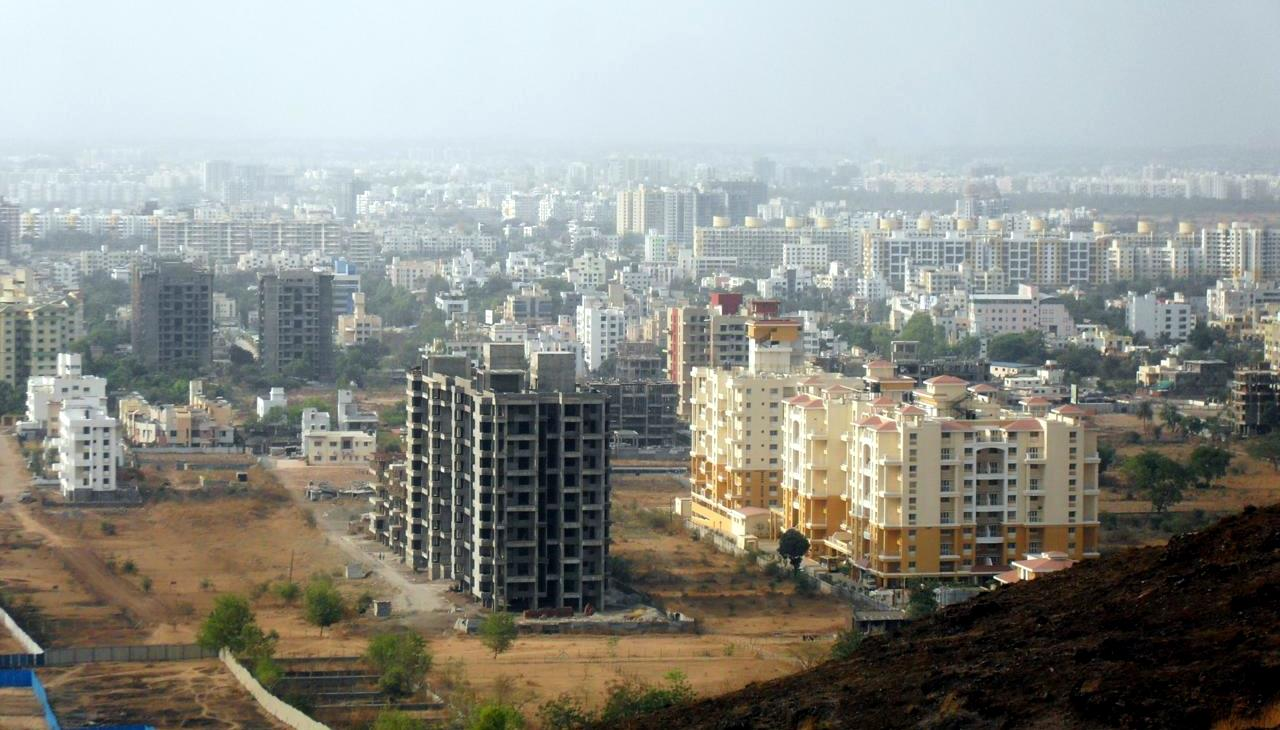
- Baner skyline

- Location in Maharashtra, India
- Coordinates: 18°33′36″N 73°47′25″E
- Country: India
- State: Maharashtra
- District: Pune District

Government
  - Body: Pune Municipal Corporation
- Elevation: 570 m (1,870 ft)

Population (2011)
  - Total: 31,972

Languages
  - Official: Marathi
- Time zone: UTC+5:30 (IST)
- PIN: 411045
- Lok Sabha constituency: Pune (Lok Sabha constituency)
- Civic agency: Pune Municipal Corporation

Baner is a suburb in the Western Metropolitan Corridor of Pune, India. Baner is well known for "Varkari" Parampara and Bhakti Aradhana from many years. Baner is bordered by Pashan in south, Balewadi to the west, Aundh to the north and Pune University to the east.

Baner is a residential and commercial hub of Pune and large portions are occupied by various IT companies.

== History ==
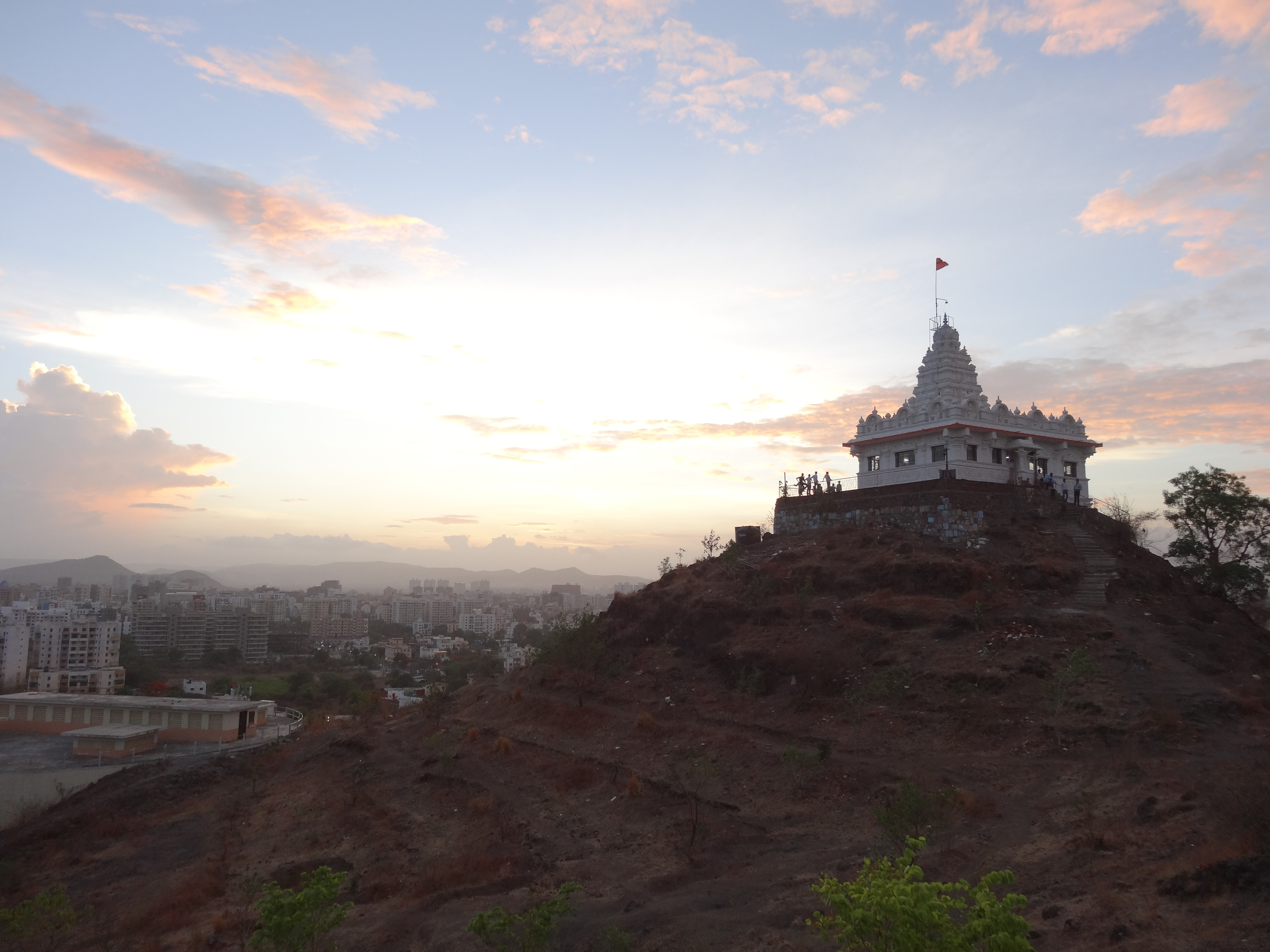
Tukai Devi Mandir Baner (Established 400 years ago)

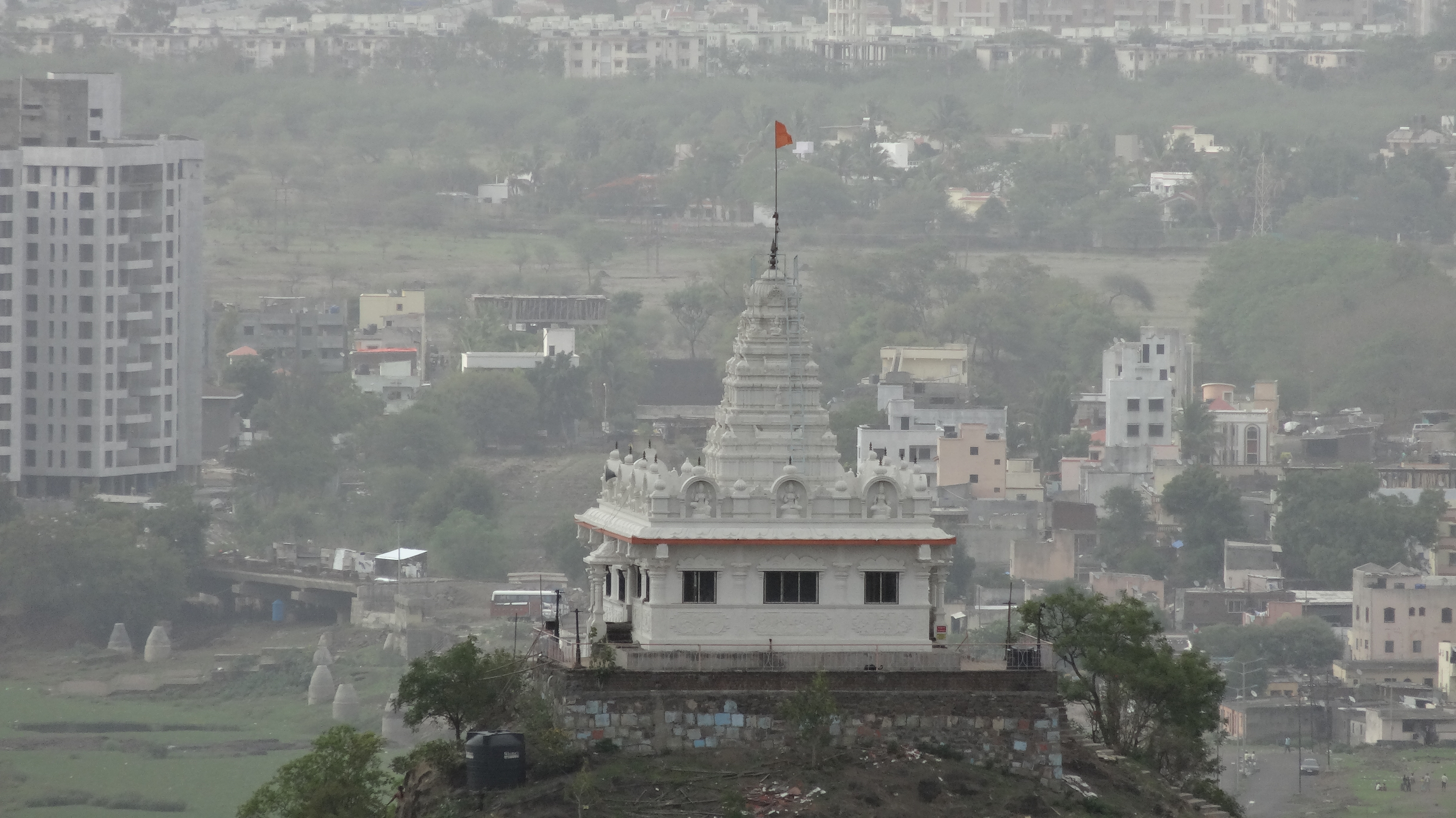
Tukai Devi Mandir Baner (Established 400 years ago)

The history of Baner dates back to the 17th century, when the Kalamkar family inherited Baner, becoming the rulers of the area. Kavaji Kalamkar built a temple of the goddess "Tukai Mata" on a hillock near Baner, which is now known as Baner Hill, part of the Baner-Pashan Biodiversity Park.

== Administration ==
Jyoti Ganesh Kalamkar, Swapnali Pralhad Saykar, Amol Ratan Balwadkar and Baburao Dattoba Chandere were the current corporators of Baner ward (PMC ward Number: 09) in Pune Municipal Corporation.

== Geography ==
Baner lies in the Western Metropolitan Corridor of Pune. Once on the outskirts, it was merged into Pune in recent years due to rapid urbanisation. Baner lies on the foothills of the hills comprising the Baner-Pashan Biodiversity Park. Baner has an average elevation of 570 m ASL. The river, Ramnadi flows through the suburb.

== Culture ==
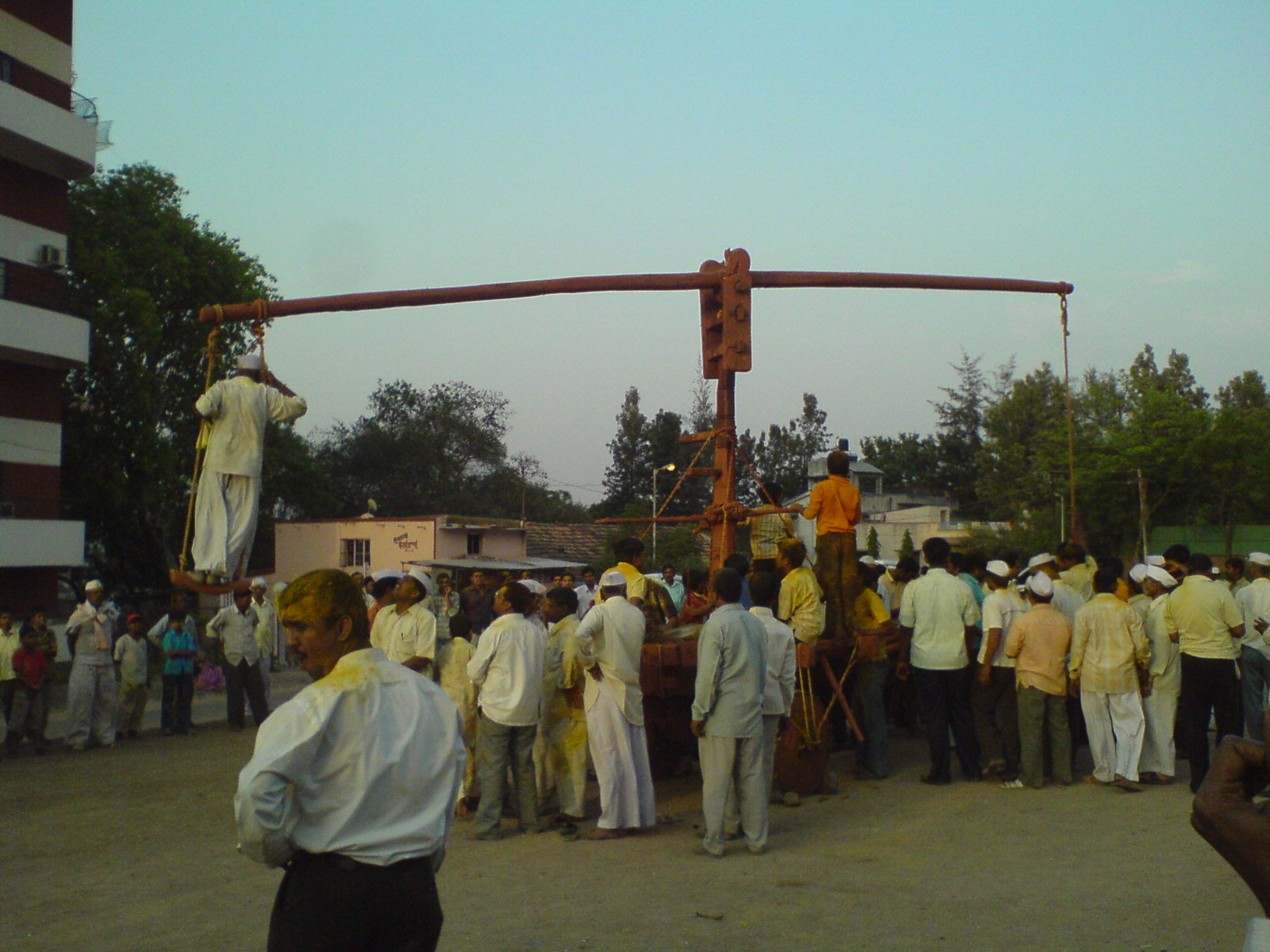
Bagad festival in Baner

Shri Ram, Hanuman, Lakshmi, Tukai, Divyai, Bhairavnath, Sant Savatamali, Baneshwar, Vitthal Rukmini, Ganpati, Dattatray and many temples are part of the cultural heritage of Baner. The most prominent temple in Baner is the Bhairavnath Temple(known as GramDaivat which means Town Deity), located in the middle of the town. During Navratri, there is a large procession to this temple and worshippers gather from around the town to pray there. On every Akshaytritiya people celebrates "Urus(GramDaivat festival)" here which is continuous for 3–4 days. In Urus they organize Tamasha, Kusti and fair. Dattajayanti, Ram Navami, Savatamali Punyatithi, Bhagwanbaba and Navratri are big festivals of Baner. Bhairavnath Devasthan trust organizes the "Ek Gav Ganpati Miravnuk Ek" program every year which gives every Ganpati Mandal in the town to show their talent in front of the whole town. On every Hanuman Jayanti, people celebrate the "Bagada Festival" in the evening.

== Agriculture ==
Baner was historically known for its agricultural development. Mango, Guava, Tamarind, Jujebes (Indian plums) were the famous fruits of Baner. "Baneri Bore" (Indian plums of Baner) got the brand name because of Baner.

After 2005, due to the influx of IT industries and residential complexes, Baner began losing its reputation as an agricultural center.

== Baner Hill ==
Baner Hill is a hill that separates two suburbs of Pune, Pashan and Baner. The hill is the third highest point within the city limits, with an elevation of 2,224 feet (678 m), surpassed by the Vetal Hill and the Sutarwadi Hill. There is a temple located at the northern foot of the hill. One can view the whole of baner on one side and the pashan area on the other.

The place is actually the home of a "plantation drive" that has been taken up by the locals and helped by volunteers. One can see people coming up early in the morning on Sunday and working in groups to make the re-vegetate the terrain.

Hidden in the route up the Baner Hill is a small cave temple. According to a folklore, these caves date back to the Pandava era and are said to be where the Pandavas lived during their exile almost 5000 years ago. But according to late Ninad Bedekar, the caves belong to the reign of Rashtrakuta Raja, nearly 2500 years ago. The architecture of the caves belongs to the Rashtrakuta dynasty because of the way the pillars as well as the steps into the cave are made.

Baner Hill is surrounded by two suburbs of Pune, Pashan and Baner. Most of its area is in Baner, so it is commonly known as Baner Hill. The hillock runs east–west. It has a spur which is locally known as the Pashan Hill which has an elevation of 2,100 feet (640 m). The temperature here is 1 to 2 degrees cooler than the temperature in the main city. The rest of the area shares almost the same climatic conditions as that of Pune.

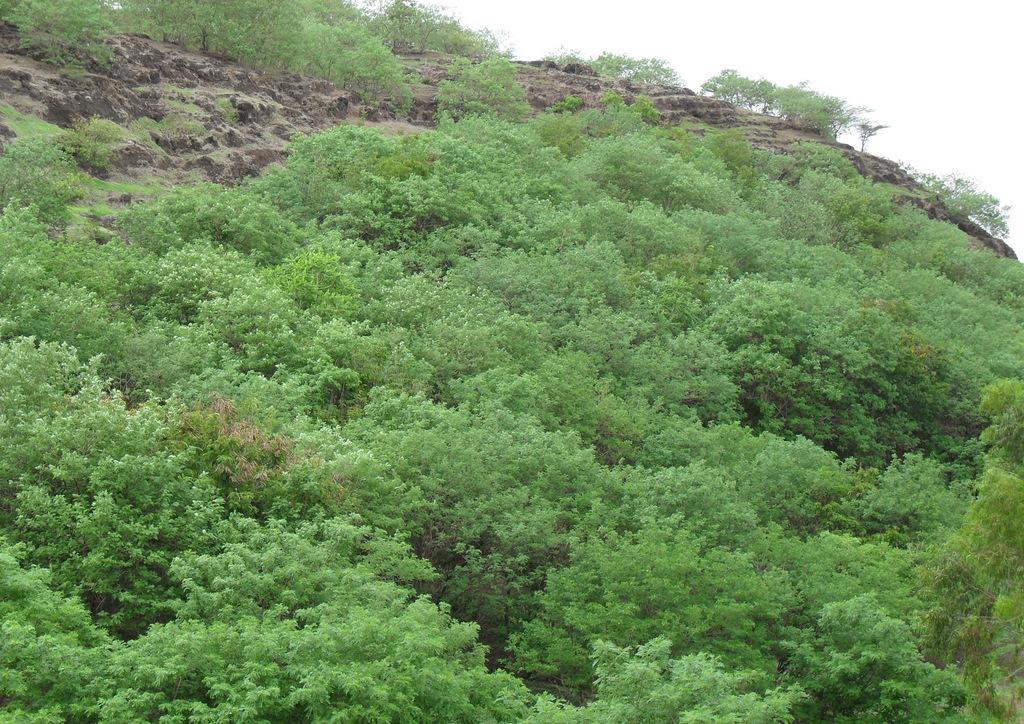
Baner hill

Sunrise at Baner hill

== Entertainment ==
Baner is home to a wide range of restaurants, cafés, and pubs. While it does not have a full-scale shopping mall or multiplex theatre, it remains a popular local hangout spot.
