= Pune Lok Sabha constituency =

Lok Sabha Constituency in Maharashtra

Coordinates: 18.5°N 73.9°E

Pune
- Lok Sabha constituency
- Pune Lok Sabha Constituency map

Constituency details
- Country: India
- Region: Western India
- State: Maharashtra
- District: Pune
- Assembly constituencies: Vadgaon Sheri; Shivajinagar; Kothrud; Parvati; Pune Cantonment; Kasba Peth
- Established: 1952–present

Member of Parliament
- 18th Lok Sabha
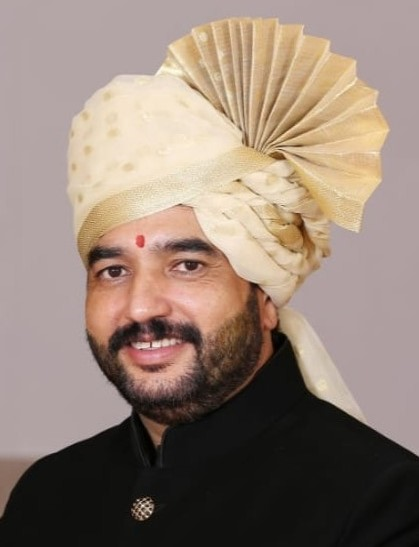
- Incumbent Murlidhar Mohol
- Party: Bharatiya Janata Party
- Elected year: 2024

Pune (formerly spelt Poona) is one of the 48 Lok Sabha (parliamentary) constituencies in Maharashtra,India.

== Vidhan Sabha segments ==
The six vidhan sabha seats covered by Pune (पुणे) constituency have been frequently rearranged due to changing demography and population explosion in the area. Seats like Shukrawar Peth (1962-1977) and Bhawani Peth no longer exist. Presently, Pune Lok Sabha constituency comprises six Vidhan Sabha (legislative assembly) segments. These segments are:

#	Name	District	Member	Party	Leading (in 2024)
208	Vadgaon Sheri	Pune	Bapusaheb Pathare	NCP-SP	BJP
209	Shivajinagar	Pune	Siddharth Shirole	BJP	BJP
210	Kothrud	Pune	Chandrakant Patil	BJP	BJP
212	Parvati	Pune	Madhuri Misal	BJP	BJP
214	Pune Cantonment (SC)	Pune	Sunil Kamble	BJP	INC
215	Kasba Peth	Pune	Hemant Rasane	BJP	BJP

== Members of Parliament ==
Year	Member	Party
1951	Narhar Vishnu Gadgil (Note: Poona Central)	Indian National Congress
1951	Indira Anant Maydeo (Note: (Poona South))	Indian National Congress
1957	Narayan Gore	Praja Socialist Party
1962	Shankarrao More	Indian National Congress
1967	Shreedhar Joshi	Samyukta Socialist Party
1971	Mohan Dharia	Indian National Congress
1977	Mohan Dharia	Janata Party
1980	Vitthalrao Gadgil	Indian National Congress
1984	Vitthalrao Gadgil	Indian National Congress
1989	Vitthalrao Gadgil	Indian National Congress
1991	Anna Joshi	Bharatiya Janata Party
1996	Suresh Kalmadi	Indian National Congress
1998	Vitthal Tupe	Indian National Congress
1999	Pradeep Rawat	Bharatiya Janata Party
2004	Suresh Kalmadi	Indian National Congress
2009	Suresh Kalmadi	Indian National Congress
2014	Anil Shirole	Bharatiya Janata Party
2019	Girish Bapat	Bharatiya Janata Party
2024	Murlidhar Mohol	Bharatiya Janata Party

- ^{†} Died in office

== Election results ==
Vote share of winning candidates
2024	52.94%
2019	61.13%
2014	57.33%
2009	38.11%
2004	48.60%
1999	41.62%
1998	52.79%
1996	50.66%
1991	44.22%
1989	43.61%
1984	60.38%
1980	50.81%
1977	55.73%
1971	58.97%
1967	51.74%
1962	43.06%
1957	59.09%
1951	53.37%

=== General election 2024 ===
2024 Indian general election: Pune
Party	Candidate	Votes	%	±%
BJP	Murlidhar Mohol	584,728	52.94	▼8.19
INC	Ravindra Dhangekar	461,690	41.80	▲12.03
VBA	Vasant More	32,012	2.90	▼3.36
NOTA	None of the above	7,460	0.68	▼0.38
Margin of victory		1,23,038	11.14	▼20.22
Turnout		11,04,769	53.57	▲3.68
BJP hold		Swing		

=== General election 2019 ===
2019 Indian general election: Pune
Party	Candidate	Votes	%	±%
BJP	Girish Bapat	632,835	61.13	▲3.40
INC	Mohan Joshi	308,207	29.77	▲4.21
VBA	Anil Jadhav	64,793	6.26	new
NOTA	None of the above	11,001	1.06	▲0.41
Margin of victory		324,628	31.36	▼0.41
Turnout		10,35,654	49.89	▼4.22
BJP hold		Swing		

=== General election 2014 ===
2014 Indian general election: Pune
Party	Candidate	Votes	%	±%
BJP	Anil Shirole	569,825	57.33	▲22.72
INC	Vishwajeet Kadam	254,056	25.56	▼12.55
MNS	Deepak Paigude	93,502	9.41	▼0.93
AAP	Subhash Shankarrao Ware	28,657	2.88	new
BSP	Imtiyaz Peerzade	14,727	1.48	▼7.09
NOTA	None of the Above	6,438	0.65	N/A
Margin of victory		315,769	31.77	▲28.27
Turnout		993,278	54.11	▲13.45
BJP gain from INC		Swing	▲19.22	

=== General election 2009 ===
2009 Indian general election: Pune
Party	Candidate	Votes	%	±%
INC	Suresh Kalmadi	279,973	38.11	▼10.49
BJP	Anil Shirole	254,272	34.61	▼6.06
MNS	Ranjeet Shirole	75,930	10.34	new
BSP	D. S. Kulkarni	62,981	8.57	N/A
PG	Arun Bhatia	30,340	4.13	N/A
Margin of victory		25,701	3.50	▼0.81
Turnout		7,34,641	40.66	N/A
INC hold		Swing		

=== General election 2004 ===
2004 Indian general election: Pune
Party	Candidate	Votes	%	±%
INC	Suresh Kalmadi	373,774	48.60	
BJP	Pradeep Rawat	300,598	39.08	
Independent	Arun Bhatia	60,237	7.83	
Margin of victory		73,176	9.52	
Turnout		769,018		
INC gain from BJP		Swing		

=== General election 1999 ===
1999 Indian general election: Pune
Party	Candidate	Votes	%	±%
BJP	Pradeep Rawat	304,955	41.62	
INC	Mohan Joshi	213,670	29.16	
NCP	Vitthal Tupe	198,738	27.13	
Margin of victory		91,285	12.46	
Turnout		732,654	52.22	
BJP gain from INC		Swing		

=== General election 1998 ===
1998 Indian general election: Pune
Party	Candidate	Votes	%	±%
INC	Vitthal Tupe	434,915	52.79	
Independent	Suresh Kalmadi	341,697	41.48	
Independent	Avinash Dharmadhikari	34,219	4.15	
Margin of victory		93,218	11.31	
Turnout		823,793	59.60	
INC hold		Swing		

=== General election 1996 ===
1996 Indian general election: Pune
Party	Candidate	Votes	%	±%
INC	Suresh Kalmadi	390,778	50.66	
BJP	Girish Bapat	303,783	39.38	
RPI	Namdeo Dhasal	56,185	7.28	
Margin of victory		86,995	11.28	
Turnout		771,356	57.00	
INC gain from BJP		Swing		

=== General election 1991 ===
1991 Indian general election: Pune
Party	Candidate	Votes	%	±%
BJP	Anna Joshi	250,272	44.22	
INC	Vitthalrao Gadgil	233,334	41.22	
JD	Sambhajirao Kakade	72,377	12.79	
Margin of victory		16,938	3.00	
Turnout		566,027	48.17	
BJP gain from INC		Swing		

=== General election 1989 ===
1989 Indian general election: Pune
Party	Candidate	Votes	%	±%
INC	Vitthalrao Gadgil	296,051	43.61	
BJP	Anna Joshi	287,870	42.41	
JD	Atur Sangtani	57,837	8.52	
RPI	Jaidev Gaikwad	25,825	3.80	
Margin of victory		8,181	1.20	
Turnout		678,858	64.21	
INC hold		Swing		

=== General election 1984 ===
1984 Indian general election: Pune
Party	Candidate	Votes	%	±%
INC	Vitthalrao Gadgil	311,278	60.38	
BJP	Jagannathrao Joshi	112,924	21.90	
JP	Mohan Dharia	53,182	10.32	
Independent	Jaidev Gaikwad	20,796	4.03	
Margin of victory		198,354	38.48	
Turnout		515,541	66.38	
INC hold		Swing		

=== General election 1980 ===
1980 Indian general election: Pune
Party	Candidate	Votes	%	±%
INC	Vitthalrao Gadgil	215,161	50.81	
JP	Narayan Ganesh Gore	186,331	44.00	
JP(S)	Shyamkant More	9,356	2.21	
Margin of victory		28,830	6.81	
Turnout		423,433	57.87	
INC gain from JP		Swing		

=== General election 1977 ===
1977 Indian general election: Pune
Party	Candidate	Votes	%	±%
JP	Mohan Dharia	209,922	55.73	
INC	Vasant Thorat	1,61,755	42.94	
Margin of victory		48,167	12.79	
Turnout		376,666	62.98	
JP gain from INC		Swing		

=== General election 1971 ===
1971 Indian general election: Poona
Party	Candidate	Votes	%	±%
INC	Mohan Dharia	208,150	58.97	
ABJS	Rambhau Mhalgi	113,662	32.20	
SSP	Bhai Vaidya	15,275	4.33	
SS	Bhagwant Ghate	6,453	1.83	
Margin of victory		94,488	26.76	
Turnout		352,998	67.95	
INC gain from SSP		Swing		

=== General election 1967 ===
1967 Indian general election: Poona
Party	Candidate	Votes	%	±%
SSP	Shreedhar Joshi	150,696	51.74	
INC	Narhar Vishnu Gadgil	137,158	47.09	
Independent	A. G. Bhide	3,396	1.17	
Margin of victory		13,538	4.65	
Turnout		291,250	69.64	
SSP gain from INC		Swing		

=== General election 1962 ===
1962 Indian general election: Poona
Party	Candidate	Votes	%	±%
INC	Shankarrao More	115,402	43.06	
PSP	Narayan Ganesh Gore	66,996	25.00	
Independent	Pralhad Keshav Atre	58,862	21.96	
ABJS	Jagannathrao Joshi	26,755	9.98	
Margin of victory		48,406	18.06	
Turnout		268,015	64.04	
INC gain from PSP		Swing		

=== General election 1957 ===
1957 Indian general election: Poona
Party	Candidate	Votes	%	±%
PSP	Narayan Ganesh Gore	143,822	59.09	
INC	Narhar Vishnu Gadgil	99,586	40.91	
Margin of victory		44,236	18.18	
Turnout		243,408	68.14	
PSP gain from INC		Swing		

=== General election 1951 ===
==== Poona Central ====
1951 Indian general election: Poona Central
Party	Candidate	Votes	%	±%
INC	Narhar Vishnu Gadgil	102,692	53.37	
PWPI	Keshavrao Jedhe	42,200	21.93	
Socialist	Shreedhar Joshi	32,333	16.80	
RRP	Kashinath Mahajan	15,181	7.89	
Margin of victory		60,492	31.44	
Turnout		192,406	47.32	
INC win				

==== Poona South ====
1951 Indian general election: Poona South
Party	Candidate	Votes	%	±%
INC	Indira Maydeo	114,720	63.99	
Socialist	Shridhar Limaye	32,432	18.09	
PWPI	Shanta More	32,137	17.92	
Margin of victory		82,288	45.90	
Turnout		179,289	47.32	
INC win				

== See also ==
- Pune district
- Baramati Lok Sabha constituency
- Shirur Lok Sabha constituency
- Maval Lok Sabha constituency
- List of constituencies of the Lok Sabha
