= Kothrud Assembly constituency =

Constituency of the Maharashtra legislative assembly in India

Coordinates: 18.51°N 73.81°E

Kothrud
- Constituency No. 210 for the Maharashtra Legislative Assembly

Constituency details
- Country: India
- Region: Western India
- State: Maharashtra
- District: Pune
- Lok Sabha constituency: Pune
- Established: 2008
- Total electors: 440,676
- Reservation: None

Member of Legislative Assembly
- 15th Maharashtra Legislative Assembly
- Incumbent Chandrakant Patil
- Party: Bharatiya Janata Party
- Elected year: 2024

Kothrud Assembly constituency is one of the 288 Maharashtra Vidhan Sabha (Assembly) constituencies of Maharashtra state in Western India. It is one of the twenty one constituencies of located in the Pune district and one of eight in Pune City.

It is a part of the Pune Lok Sabha constituency along with five other assembly constituencies, viz Kasba Peth, Parvati, Pune Cantonment (SC), Shivajinagar, Vadgaon Sheri from Pune City.

Kothrud Assembly Constituency came into existence by dividing Shivaji Nagar assembly constituency as well as dissolving Bhavani Peth constituency. It was not swing from Nationalist Congress Party to Shiv Sena. It is the stronghold of Shiv Sena. After division Kothrud won by Shiv Sena and Shivajinagar by Vinayak Nimhan, Indian National Congress.

== Members of the Legislative Assembly ==
Year	Member	Party
From 1967- 2008: See Bhavani Peth
1967	Tikamdas Memjade	Indian National Congress
1972	Tikamdas Memjade	Indian National Congress
1978	Bhai Vaidya	Janata Party
1980	Amminuddin Penwale	Indian National Congress (I)
1985	Prakash Dhere	Independent
1990	Prakash Dhere	Indian National Congress
1995	Deepak Paigude	Shiv Sena
1999	Deepak Paigude	Shiv Sena
2004	Kamal Ulhas Dhole Patil	Nationalist Congress Party
2008 onwards: renamed Kothrud
2009	Chandrakant Mokate	Shiv Sena
2014	Medha Kulkarni	Bharatiya Janata Party
2019	Chandrakant Patil	Bharatiya Janata Party
2024	Chandrakant Patil	Bharatiya Janata Party

== Election results ==
=== Assembly Election 2024 ===
2024 Maharashtra Legislative Assembly election : Kothrud
Party	Candidate	Votes	%	±%
BJP	Chandrakant Bachhu Patil	159,234	69.34	▲14.28
SS(UBT)	Chandrakant Mokate	47,193	20.55	New
MNS	Adv. Kishor Nana Shinde	18,105	7.88	▼33.84
NOTA	None of the Above	3,152	1.37	▼0.73
VBA	Yogesh Rajapurkar	1,804	0.79	▼0.48
Margin of victory		112,041	48.79	▲35.45
Turnout		232,792	52.83	▲4.90
Total valid votes		229,640		
Registered electors		440,676		▲8.85
BJP hold		Swing	▲14.28	

=== Assembly Election 2019 ===
2019 Maharashtra Legislative Assembly election : Kothrud
Party	Candidate	Votes	%	±%
BJP	Chandrakant Bachhu Patil	105,246	55.07	▲3.50
MNS	Adv. Kishor Nana Shinde	79,751	41.73	▲30.80
NOTA	None of the Above	4,028	2.11	▲1.30
VBA	Adv. Deepak Narayanrao Shamdire	2,428	1.27	New
AAP	Dr. Abhijit Hindurao More	1,380	0.72	New
Margin of victory		25,495	13.34	▼19.69
Turnout		195,158	48.20	▼8.91
Total valid votes		191,129		
Registered electors		404,858		▲16.06
BJP hold		Swing	▲3.50	

=== Assembly Election 2014 ===
2014 Maharashtra Legislative Assembly election : Kothrud
Party	Candidate	Votes	%	±%
BJP	Medha Kulkarni	100,941	51.57	New
SS	Chandrakant Mokate	36,279	18.53	▼15.12
NCP	Baburao Dattobo Chandere	28,179	14.40	▲2.05
MNS	Adv. Kishor Nana Shinde	21,392	10.93	▼18.06
INC	Umesh Namdev Kandhare	6,713	3.43	New
NOTA	None of the Above	1,583	0.81	New
Margin of victory		64,662	33.03	▲28.37
Turnout		197,338	56.57	▲9.75
Total valid votes		195,754		
Registered electors		348,846		▲4.54
BJP gain from SS		Swing	▲17.92	

=== Assembly Election 2009 ===
2009 Maharashtra Legislative Assembly election : Kothrud
Party	Candidate	Votes	%	±%
SS	Chandrakant Mokate	52,055	33.65	New
MNS	Adv. Kishor Nana Shinde	44,843	28.99	New
Independent	Deepak Mankar	22,853	14.77	New
NCP	Anna Joshi	19,095	12.34	New
Independent	Ujawal Keskar	10,000	6.46	New
BSP	Raju Shitaram Sanke	1,518	0.98	New
Margin of victory		7,212	4.66	
Turnout		154,725	46.37	
Total valid votes		154,701		
Registered electors		333,693		
SS win (new seat)				

== See also ==
- Kothrud
- Pune
- Shivajinagar Assembly constituency (Kothrud area was part of this constituency until 2008)
- List of constituencies of Maharashtra Legislative Assembly
