= Bhavani Peth Assembly constituency =

Former constituency of the Maharashtra legislative assembly in India

Coordinates: 18.510°N 73.871°E

Bhavani Peth
- Former constituency for the Maharashtra Legislative Assembly

Constituency details
- Country: India
- Region: Western India
- State: Maharashtra
- Lok Sabha constituency: Pune
- Established: 1967
- Abolished: 2008

Bhavani Peth Assembly constituency was one of the 288 assembly constituencies of Maharashtra a western state of India. Bhavani Peth was also part of Pune Lok Sabha constituency. Bhavani Peth seat existed till 2004 elections until Kothrud Assembly constituency was formed in the delimitation of 2008.

== Members of the Legislative Assembly ==
Election	Name	Party
1967	Tikamdas Memjade	Indian National Congress
1972	Tikamdas Memjade	Indian National Congress
1978	Bhai Vaidya	Janata Party
1980	Amminuddin Penwale	Indian National Congress (I)
1985	Prakash Dhere	Independent
1990	Prakash Dhere	Indian National Congress
1995	Deepak Paigude	Shiv Sena
1999	Deepak Paigude	Shiv Sena
2004	Kamal Dhole Patil	Nationalist Congress Party
2008 onwards: See Kothrud

== Election results ==
=== Assembly Election 2004 ===
2004 Maharashtra Legislative Assembly election : Bhavani Peth
Party	Candidate	Votes	%	±%
NCP	Kamal Ulhas Dhole Patil	39,861	44.50%	▲14.45
SS	Deepak Natharam Paigude	39,604	44.21%	▲10.47
BSP	Kamble Yashwant Maruti	6,315	7.05%	▲4.37
SP	Sayed Munwwar Maheboob	1,535	1.71%	New
Independent	Shenadge Ganesh Dadu	575	0.64%	New
Margin of victory		257	0.29%	▼3.40
Turnout		89,585	48.12%	▼2.38
Total valid votes		89,580		
Registered electors		186,174		▲2.93
NCP gain from SS		Swing	▲10.76	

=== Assembly Election 1999 ===
1999 Maharashtra Legislative Assembly election : Bhavani Peth
Party	Candidate	Votes	%	±%
SS	Deepak Natharam Paigude	29,689	33.74%	▼8.16
NCP	Ulhas Balkrinshna Dholepatil	26,446	30.05%	New
BBM	Nadaf Hajisab Meerasab	21,383	24.30%	New
Independent	Sadanand Krishna Shetty	4,170	4.74%	New
Independent	Andekar Ramakant Ranoji	2,562	2.91%	New
BSP	Swami Walmiki	2,356	2.68%	▼17.74
ABS	Chandrashekhar (Nana) Gavhane	583	0.66%	New
Margin of victory		3,243	3.69%	▼7.86
Turnout		91,345	50.50%	▼16.24
Total valid votes		88,001		
Registered electors		180,883		▲5.24
SS hold		Swing	▼8.16	

=== Assembly Election 1995 ===
1995 Maharashtra Legislative Assembly election : Bhavani Peth
Party	Candidate	Votes	%	±%
SS	Deepak Natharam Paigude	48,063	41.90%	▲11.74
INC	Dhere Prakash Keshavrao	34,818	30.35%	▼11.77
BSP	Nadaf Hajisab Meerasab	23,417	20.41%	New
JD	Sharma Radheshyam Bansilal	3,892	3.39%	▼18.14
JP	Gondhale Gulabsing Chhotusing	1,004	0.88%	New
Margin of victory		13,245	11.55%	▼0.41
Turnout		116,286	67.66%	▲9.41
Total valid votes		114,715		
Registered electors		171,879		▲6.47
SS gain from INC		Swing	▼0.22	

=== Assembly Election 1990 ===
1990 Maharashtra Legislative Assembly election : Bhavani Peth
Party	Candidate	Votes	%	±%
INC	Dhere Prakash Keshavrao	38,986	42.12%	New
SS	Kachi Rajan Namdeorao	27,917	30.16%	New
JD	Inamdar Nasruddin Sharfuddin	19,929	21.53%	New
BRP	Kambale Subhash Dharma	3,084	3.33%	New
Independent	Lodha Vilas Popatlal	858	0.93%	New
Margin of victory		11,069	11.96%	▼1.99
Turnout		93,560	57.95%	▲1.91
Total valid votes		92,562		
Registered electors		161,438		▲26.80
INC gain from Independent		Swing	▼7.12	

=== Assembly Election 1985 ===
1985 Maharashtra Legislative Assembly election : Bhavani Peth
Party	Candidate	Votes	%	±%
Independent	Dhere Prakash Keshavrao	34,745	49.24%	New
JP	Bhalchandra Vaidya	24,899	35.28%	▲1.53
Independent	Raj Salve	3,321	4.71%	New
Independent	Saiyed Ashabai Najir	2,985	4.23%	New
Independent	Kaka Wadke	2,613	3.70%	New
RPI	Kamble Sadanand Bhimrao	573	0.81%	New
Margin of victory		9,846	13.95%	▲1.00
Turnout		71,358	56.05%	▲7.34
Total valid votes		70,566		
Registered electors		127,317		▲3.90
Independent gain from INC(I)		Swing	▲2.53	

=== Assembly Election 1980 ===
1980 Maharashtra Legislative Assembly election : Bhavani Peth
Party	Candidate	Votes	%	±%
INC(I)	Amminuddin A. A. Penwale	27,520	46.71%	▲24.28
JP	Bhalchandra Vaidya	19,886	33.75%	▼13.94
INC(U)	Kirad Sheela Mathuradas	8,929	15.15%	New
Independent	Suryawanshi Namdeorao	1,972	3.35%	New
Margin of victory		7,634	12.96%	▼7.39
Turnout		59,587	48.63%	▼18.39
Total valid votes		58,922		
Registered electors		122,541		▲12.32
INC(I) gain from JP		Swing	▼0.98	

=== Assembly Election 1978 ===
1978 Maharashtra Legislative Assembly election : Bhavani Peth
Party	Candidate	Votes	%	±%
JP	Bhalchandra Vaidya	34,586	47.69%	New
INC	Kirad M. H. Alias Babanrao	19,827	27.34%	▼29.28
INC(I)	Penwale Aminuddin Abdul Ajij	16,266	22.43%	New
Independent	Baburao Tatyaba Bhosale	452	0.62%	New
Margin of victory		14,759	20.35%	▼13.21
Turnout		73,779	67.63%	▲9.44
Total valid votes		72,522		
Registered electors		109,098		▲1.60
JP gain from INC		Swing	▼8.93	

=== Assembly Election 1972 ===
1972 Maharashtra Legislative Assembly election : Bhavani Peth
Party	Candidate	Votes	%	±%
INC	Tikamdas Daduram Memjade	34,677	56.62%	▲3.71
SSP	Keshavkantji Janjot	14,125	23.06%	New
ABJS	Raghunath R. Holkar	7,444	12.15%	New
RPI	Kamble Bajirao Dashrath	3,914	6.39%	▼27.33
RPI(K)	R. C. Kumble	561	0.92%	New
Independent	Tukaram Sitaram Lonare	524	0.86%	New
Margin of victory		20,552	33.56%	▲14.36
Turnout		62,353	58.07%	▼6.18
Total valid votes		61,245		
Registered electors		107,375		▲38.77
INC hold		Swing	▲3.71	

=== Assembly Election 1967 ===
1967 Maharashtra Legislative Assembly election : Bhavani Peth
Party	Candidate	Votes	%	±%
INC	Tikamdas Daduram Memjade	25,883	52.91%	New
RPI	M. B. Sawant	16,493	33.72%	New
PSP	R. S. Adagale	3,943	8.06%	New
Independent	T. H. Jawale	707	1.45%	New
Independent	V. D. Jagtap	595	1.22%	New
Independent	T. D. Gaikwad	373	0.76%	New
Independent	V. R. Bhosale	351	0.72%	New
Margin of victory		9,390	19.20%	
Turnout		52,997	68.49%	
Total valid votes		48,916		
Registered electors		77,376		
INC win (new seat)				

== See also ==
- Bhavani Peth
- Pune City
- Shivajinagar Assembly constituency
- Kothrud Assembly constituency
- List of constituencies of Maharashtra Legislative Assembly
