= Shivajinagar, Maharashtra Assembly constituency =

Constituency of the Maharashtra legislative assembly in India

Coordinates: 18°31′58.74″N 73°49′18.12″E

Shivajinagar
- Constituency No. 209 for the Maharashtra Legislative Assembly

Constituency details
- Country: India
- Region: Western India
- State: Maharashtra
- District: Pune
- Lok Sabha constituency: Pune
- Established: 1957
- Total electors: 295,246
- Reservation: None

Member of Legislative Assembly
- 15th Maharashtra Legislative Assembly
- Incumbent Siddharth Shirole
- Party: BJP
- Elected year: 2024
- Preceded by: Vinayak Nimhan, INC

Shivajinagar Assembly constituency is one of the twenty one constituencies of Maharashtra Legislative Assembly located in Pune district, and one of eight in Pune City.

It is a segment of Pune Lok Sabha constituency along with five other assembly constituencies from Pune district, namely Kasba Peth, Parvati, Pune Cantonment (SC), Kothrud and Vadgaon Sheri.

== Members of Legislative Assembly ==
Year	Member	Party
1957	Jayant Shridhar Tilak	Hindu Mahasabha
1962	Sadashiv Barve	Indian National Congress
1967	B. D. Killedar	Peasants and Workers Party
1972	Ravindra More	Indian National Congress
1978	Shanti Narayan Naik	Janata Party
1980	Anna Joshi	Bharatiya Janata Party
1985	Anna Joshi	Bharatiya Janata Party
1990	Shashikant Sutar	Shiv Sena
1995	Shashikant Sutar	Shiv Sena
1999	Vinayak Nimhan	Shiv Sena
2004	Vinayak Nimhan	Shiv Sena
2009	Vinayak Nimhan	Indian National Congress
2014	Vijay Kale	Bharatiya Janata Party
2019	Siddharth Shirole	Bharatiya Janata Party
2024	Siddharth Shirole	Bharatiya Janata Party

== Election results ==
=== Assembly Election 2024 ===
2024 Maharashtra Legislative Assembly election : Shivajinagar
Party	Candidate	Votes	%	±%
BJP	Siddharth Shirole	84,695	55.99	▲11.39
INC	Datta Bahirat	47,993	31.73	▼8.98
Independent	Anand Manish Surendra	13,061	8.63	New
VBA	Sirsange Paresh Shankar	2,444	1.62	▼6.32
NOTA	None of the Above	2,044	1.35	▼0.46
Margin of victory		36,702	24.26	▲20.37
Turnout		153,314	51.93	▲8.16
Total valid votes		151,270		
Registered electors		295,246		
BJP hold		Swing	▲11.39	

=== Assembly Election 2019 ===
2019 Maharashtra Legislative Assembly election : Shivajinagar
Party	Candidate	Votes	%	±%
BJP	Siddharth Shirole	58,727	44.60	▲6.09
INC	Datta Bahirat	53,603	40.71	▲17.24
VBA	Anil Shankar Kurhade	10,454	7.94	New
MNS	Nimhan Suhas Bhagwanrao	5,272	4.00	▼2.69
NOTA	None of the Above	2,390	1.82	▲0.56
BSP	Gaikwad Satyawan Baban	883	0.67	▼2.02
Margin of victory		5,124	3.89	▼11.15
Turnout		134,780		▼8.23
Total valid votes		131,680		
Registered electors		305,700		
BJP hold		Swing	▲6.09	

=== Assembly Election 2014 ===
2014 Maharashtra Legislative Assembly election : Shivajinagar
Party	Candidate	Votes	%	±%
BJP	Vijay Kale	56,460	38.51	▲15.05
INC	Vinayak Mahadeo Nimhan	34,413	23.47	▼15.84
NCP	Anil Shivajirao Bhosale	24,173	16.49	New
SS	Milind Ramakant Ekbote	14,662	10.00	New
MNS	Raju Alias Dattatray Pawar	9,809	6.69	▼13.49
BSP	Ajay Shinde	3,949	2.69	▲1.43
NOTA	None of the Above	1,842	1.26	New
Margin of victory		22,047	15.04	▼0.81
Turnout		148,926		▲8.46
Total valid votes		146,620		
Registered electors		285,754		
BJP gain from INC		Swing	▼0.80	

=== Assembly Election 2009 ===
2009 Maharashtra Legislative Assembly election : Shivajinagar
Party	Candidate	Votes	%	±%
INC	Vinayak Mahadeo Nimhan	50,918	39.31	New
BJP	Prof. Vikas Mathkari	30,388	23.46	New
MNS	Ranjit Shrikant Shirole	26,143	20.18	New
RPI(A)	Wadekar Parshuram Balkrushna	15,920	12.29	New
BSP	Chavan Santosh Ramesh	1,638	1.26	▼0.39
Independent	Kishor Pundlik Shinde	1,207	0.93	New
Margin of victory		20,530	15.85	▼3.43
Turnout		129,533	42.86	▼6.86
Total valid votes		129,529		
Registered electors		302,251		▼24.15
INC gain from SS		Swing	▼18.60	

=== Assembly Election 2004 ===
2004 Maharashtra Legislative Assembly election : Shivajinagar
Party	Candidate	Votes	%	±%
SS	Vinayak Mahadeo Nimhan	114,713	57.91	▲18.08
NCP	Anil Shivajirao Bhosale	76,532	38.64	▲8.84
BSP	Kamble Sanjay Suresh	3,287	1.66	New
Independent	Narayan Shankar Wambhire	1,326	0.67	New
Independent	Suryawanshi Raju Shivaji	1,227	0.62	New
Margin of victory		38,181	19.28	▲9.23
Turnout		198,118	49.72	▼3.39
Total valid votes		198,084		
Registered electors		398,465		▲23.98
SS hold		Swing	▲18.08	

=== Assembly Election 1999 ===
1999 Maharashtra Legislative Assembly election : Shivajinagar
Party	Candidate	Votes	%	±%
SS	Vinayak Nimhan	67,979	39.83	▼11.77
NCP	Ankush Kakade	50,842	29.79	New
INC	Adv. Vandana Chavan	42,899	25.14	▼14.23
Independent	Milind Ramakant Ekbote	8,380	4.91	New
Margin of victory		17,137	10.04	▼2.20
Turnout		175,043	54.46	▼14.03
Total valid votes		170,654		
Registered electors		321,392		▲8.71
SS hold		Swing	▼11.77	

=== Assembly Election 1995 ===
1995 Maharashtra Legislative Assembly election : Shivajinagar
Party	Candidate	Votes	%	±%
SS	Shashikant Sutar	102,409	51.61	▲1.14
INC	Adv. Vandana Chavan	78,119	39.37	▼4.79
Independent	Journalist Dwarkanath Lele	4,462	2.25	New
JD	Doctor Balwant Dhondiram Bhujbal	3,546	1.79	▼2.02
BSP	Waghmare Shankar Shivaji	2,079	1.05	New
Independent	Gopal Vanjari	1,604	0.81	New
Margin of victory		24,290	12.24	▲5.93
Turnout		201,205	68.06	▲6.69
Total valid votes		198,447		
Registered electors		295,630		▲16.65
SS hold		Swing	▲1.14	

=== Assembly Election 1990 ===
1990 Maharashtra Legislative Assembly election : Shivajinagar
Party	Candidate	Votes	%	±%
SS	Shashikant Sutar	77,297	50.46	New
INC	Ankush Kakade	67,637	44.16	▼4.77
JD	Ratnakar Mahajan	5,831	3.81	New
Margin of victory		9,660	6.31	▲6.20
Turnout		154,665	61.03	▲2.37
Total valid votes		153,170		
Registered electors		253,443		▲47.37
SS gain from BJP		Swing	▲1.43	

=== Assembly Election 1985 ===
1985 Maharashtra Legislative Assembly election : Shivajinagar
Party	Candidate	Votes	%	±%
BJP	Laxman Sonopant Joshi	48,969	49.04	▲12.50
INC	Shridhar Madgulkar	48,858	48.92	New
Margin of victory		111	0.11	▼0.96
Turnout		100,867	58.65	▲8.75
Total valid votes		99,864		
Registered electors		171,982		▲17.94
BJP hold		Swing	▲12.50	

=== Assembly Election 1980 ===
1980 Maharashtra Legislative Assembly election : Shivajinagar
Party	Candidate	Votes	%	±%
BJP	Laxman Sonopant Joshi	26,273	36.53	New
INC(I)	Shridhar Madgulkar	25,500	35.46	New
JP	Khilare Divakar J.	13,379	18.60	▼37.78
INC(U)	Kakade Ankush K.	5,888	8.19	New
Margin of victory		773	1.07	▼13.17
Turnout		72,860	49.96	▼17.61
Total valid votes		71,916		
Registered electors		145,823		▲13.01
BJP gain from JP		Swing	▼19.85	

=== Assembly Election 1978 ===
1978 Maharashtra Legislative Assembly election : Shivajinagar
Party	Candidate	Votes	%	±%
JP	Shanti Narayan Naik	48,696	56.38	New
INC	Suresh Kalmadi	36,393	42.14	▼14.50
Margin of victory		12,303	14.24	▼17.65
Turnout		87,654	67.93	▲5.67
Total valid votes		86,368		
Registered electors		129,040		▲28.42
JP gain from INC		Swing	▼0.25	

=== Assembly Election 1972 ===
1972 Maharashtra Legislative Assembly election : Shivajinagar
Party	Candidate	Votes	%	±%
INC	Ravindra More	34,862	56.63	▲21.41
PWPI	Killedar B. D.	15,226	24.73	▼27.86
ABJS	Laxman Sonopant Joshi	9,190	14.93	▲7.03
RPI(K)	K. M. Bhalerao	1,066	1.73	New
Independent	Pawar Lamuvel Shantavan	1,018	1.65	New
Margin of victory		19,636	31.90	▲14.54
Turnout		62,947	62.64	▼0.20
Total valid votes		61,557		
Registered electors		100,486		▲38.15
INC gain from PWPI		Swing	▲4.04	

=== Assembly Election 1967 ===
1967 Maharashtra Legislative Assembly election : Shivajinagar
Party	Candidate	Votes	%	±%
PWPI	B. D. Killedar	23,509	52.59	New
INC	N. R. Mate	15,747	35.23	▼24.75
ABJS	N. B. Agarwal	3,531	7.90	▼21.24
Independent	D. B. Sonawane	1,915	4.28	New
Margin of victory		7,762	17.36	▼13.47
Turnout		47,837	65.77	▼8.69
Total valid votes		44,702		
Registered electors		72,736		▲0.97
PWPI gain from INC		Swing	▼7.38	

=== Assembly Election 1962 ===
1962 Maharashtra Legislative Assembly election : Shivajinagar
Party	Candidate	Votes	%	±%
INC	Sadashiv Govind Barve	30,306	59.98	▲30.07
ABJS	Ramchandra Kashinath Mhalagi	14,723	29.14	New
ABHM	Ganpat Mahadev Nalavade	3,993	7.90	▼62.19
Socialist Party (India)	Nikanth Waman Limaye	1,509	2.99	New
Margin of victory		15,583	30.84	▼9.34
Turnout		52,400	72.74	▼5.63
Total valid votes		50,531		
Registered electors		72,040		▲17.45
INC gain from ABHM		Swing	▼10.12	

=== Assembly Election 1957 ===
1957 Bombay State Legislative Assembly election : Shivajinagar
Party	Candidate	Votes	%	±%
ABHM	Jayant Shridhar Tilak	32,575	70.09	New
INC	Shinde Nalinibai Sahebrao	13,900	29.91	New
Margin of victory		18,675	40.18	
Turnout		46,475	75.77	
Total valid votes		46,475		
Registered electors		61,335		
ABHM win (new seat)				

== See also ==
- For Vidhana Sabha constituency with the same name in Bengaluru, Karnataka, see Shivajinagar (Vidhana Sabha constituency)
- List of constituencies of Maharashtra Legislative Assembly
