= Suresh Kalmadi =

Indian politician (1944–2026)

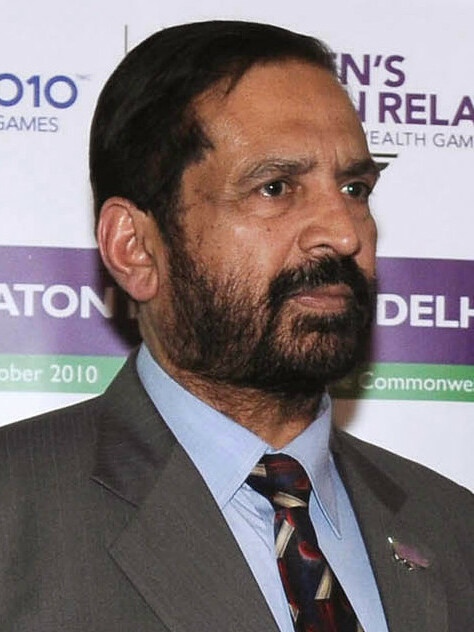
- Kalmadi in 2009

9th President of Indian Olympic Association
- In office 1996 – 26 April 2011
- Preceded by: Sivanthi Adithan
- Succeeded by: Vijay Kumar Malhotra (as acting president)

President of Asian Athletics Association
- In office 2000–2013
- Preceded by: Mohamad Bob Hasan
- Succeeded by: HE Mr. Dahlan Bin Jaman Al-Hamad

Member of parliament, Lok Sabha
- In office 9 May 1996 – 3 March 1998
- Preceded by: Anna Joshi
- Succeeded by: Vitthal Tupe
- Constituency: Pune
- In office 16 May 2004 – 16 May 2014
- Preceded by: Pradeep Rawat
- Succeeded by: Anil Shirole

Minister of State for Railways
- In office 15 September 1995 – 16 May 1996
- Preceded by: Mallikarjun Goud
- Succeeded by: Satpal Maharaj

Member of Parliament, Rajya Sabha
- In office (1982 - 1996), (1998 – 2004)
- Constituency: Maharashtra

Personal details
- Born: 1 May 1944 Madras, Madras Province, British India
- Died: 6 January 2026 (aged 81) Pune, Maharashtra, India
- Party: Indian National Congress (1977–2026)
- Other political affiliations: Indian Youth Congress (Socialist) (1981–1986); Pune Vikas Aghadi (1998)
- Spouse: Meera Kalmadi

Suresh Kalmadi (1 May 1944 – 6 January 2026) was an Indian politician and senior sports administrator. He was a member of the Indian National Congress. He was a member of parliament from Pune until May 2014. He is alleged to have been involved in corrupt practices in relation to the 2010 Commonwealth Games during his tenure as president of the Indian Olympic Association and chairman of the Commonwealth Games 2010. He was charged with conspiracy, forgery, misconduct under provisions of the Prevention of Corruption Act and later arrested for the same in April 2014, but had not yet faced trial. In December 2016, the Indian Olympic Association (IOA) named Suresh Kalmadi as its lifetime patron. However, he refused to accept the post until he was able to clear his name.

== Early life ==
Kalmadi was born to Mangalore-based Dr. K. Shamrao Kalmadi and Shanta Rao Kalmadi. He spoke Konkani, Kannada, Marathi, English, Hindi and Tulu. He was educated at St. Vincent's High School and Fergusson College, Pune. Kalmadi joined the National Defence Academy in 1960 and was commissioned as a pilot in the Indian Air Force, serving between 1964 and 1972. He then became an instructor with the Air Force Training Team of the NDA from 1972 to 1974 before retiring from the IAF as a squadron leader.

== Political career ==
In 1977, Kalmadi became the president of the Indian Youth Congress, Pune, and the next year took over Presidency of the Youth Congress, Maharashtra, a post he held from 1978 to 1980. In 1980, as the president of the Maharashtra Athletics Association, Kalmadi undertook the selection trials for the Marathon team to represent the country at the Moscow Olympics. This soon led to the establishment of the Pune International Marathon.

Kalmadi served as president of the Indian Youth Congress (Socialist) 1981–1986.

He was a member of the Rajya Sabha for three terms from 1982 to 1996, and again in 1998.

Kalmadi took over as the Chairman of the Maharashtra Tourism Development Corporation and in 1989 started the Pune Festival.

He was also elected to the 11th Lok Sabha in 1996, and to the 14th Lok Sabha in 2004. During the tenure of P. V. Narasimha Rao as the Prime Minister of India, Suresh Kalmadi served as the Minister of State for Railways from 1995 to 1996. That year he presented the Railway Budget.

Kalmadi served as the president of the Indian Olympic Association from 1996 to 2012. He also served as the president of Asian Athletics Association from 2000 to 2013 and was named its Life President in 2015.

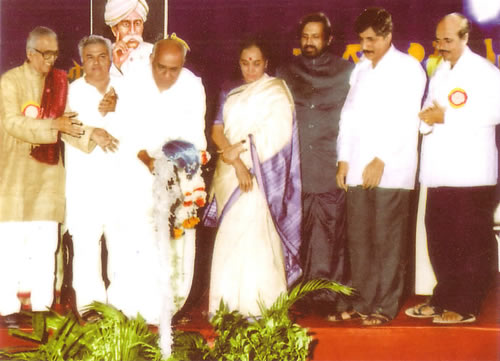
Suresh Kalmadi at the inauguration of the First World Konkani Convention in 1995. He is dressed in a black coat, to the right.

== Controversies ==
=== Corruption related to Formula One 2011 ===
Kalmadi, as the Indian Olympic Association, signed an agreement to bring the Formula One Grand Prix to India in 2007. Later that year, the UK-based organizers Formula One Administration Limited signed a ₹16 billion (equivalent to ₹48 billion or US$500 million in 2023) contract in this regard with India-based JPSK Sports Private Limited. Records obtained by The Indian Express showed that Pune-based Sulba Realty Private Limited was a 13% shareholder in JPSK, along with Jaypee Group (74%). Kalmadi's son Sumeer was a director in Sulba Realty at the time, which would have implied a conflict of interest. While the JP in JPSK stood for Jaypee Group, it was alleged that the SK was a reference to Suresh/Sumeer Kalmadi. Records from the Registrar of Companies, India showed that a year after the company was floated, Kalmadi's daughter, Payal Aditya Bhartia, and his son-in-law, Aditya Bhartia, joined JPSK as independent directors.

=== Commonwealth Games 2010 ===
Kalmadi's conduct around the 2010 Commonwealth Games came under scrutiny, with the Central Vigilance Commission (India's anti-corruption organisation) asking the Central Bureau of Investigation to probe certain aspects of the games' organisation. For this, the opposition demanded Kalmadi's resignation.

On 2 August 2010, Suresh Kalmadi had bought hundreds of air conditioners for ₹4,00,000 and treadmills for ₹9,00,000 for the Commonwealth games and the sports facilities of Indian players. The Central Vigilance Commission (CVC) blamed agencies under the Delhi government and the sports ministry for large-scale procedural violations and corruption.

On 25 April 2011, the CBI arrested Kalmadi in the Timing-Scoring-Result (TSR) case. He was charged under Sections 120 B (criminal conspiracy) and 420 (cheating) of the Indian Penal Code.

On 20 May 2011, the CBI filed the first chargesheet in a special CBI court against Kalmadi. The CBI alleged that he was the main accused in awarding the TSR system contract to a Swiss firm. The charge sheet said, "Kalmadi is the main accused as he was the person with all supreme powers. He had the supreme overriding powers in the Organising Committee of the CWG, 2010." In addition to Kalmadi, the CBI named two companies and eight persons including OC former Secretary General Lalit Bhanot and former Director General VK Verma as accused.

Kalmadi's membership of the Indian National Congress Party was suspended after being arrested and charged with corruption. On 26 April 2011 he was sacked from the post of president of the Indian Olympic Association. On 1 July 2013 he lost the election for the post of president of the Asian Athletics Association, a post which he had held for 13 consecutive years, losing to Qatar's Dahlan Jumaan Al-Hamad.

Suresh Kalmadi was in jail for 10 months and the court asked him to pay a surety amount of ₹500,000 (equivalent to ₹940,000 or US$9,800 in 2023). Kalmadi was allowed by a Delhi court on 13 July 2012 to go to London for the 2012 Olympics. He was, however, restrained on 25 July 2012 by the Delhi High court from participating in the opening ceremony of the London Olympics, saying his participation could cause "embarrassment" to the nation.

He claimed to be suffering from dementia during the course of the investigation while in Tihar jail. Medical tests were not conclusive to be able to prove his claim.

== Rajya Sabha Election History ==
Position	Party	Constituency	From	To	Tenure
Member of Parliament, Rajya Sabha (1st Term)	IC(S)	Maharashtra	3 April 1982	2 April 1988	5 years, 365 days
Member of Parliament, Rajya Sabha (2nd Term)	INC(I)	Maharashtra	3 April 1988	2 April 1994	5 years, 364 days
Member of Parliament, Rajya Sabha (3rd Term)	INC(I)	Maharashtra	3 April 1994	10 May 1996	2 years, 37 days
Member of Parliament, Rajya Sabha (4th Term)	INC	Maharashtra	5 July 1998	13 May 2004	5 years, 313 days

== Personal life and death ==
Kalmadi was married to Meera. The couple had two daughters and one son.

On 6 January 2026, Kalmadi died from a prolonged illness at the Deenanath Mangeshkar Hospital in Pune, where he was undergoing treatment. He was 81. His last rites were performed later in the day at the Vaikunth Crematorium in Navi Peth, Pune.

Lok Sabha
Preceded by Anna Joshi	Member of Parliament for Pune; 1996–1998	Succeeded by Vitthal Tupe
Preceded by Pradeep Rawat	Member of Parliament for Pune; 2004–2014	Succeeded by Anil Shirole
Civic offices
Preceded by Sivanthi Adithan	President of Indian Olympic Association; 1996–2011	Succeeded by Vijay Kumar Malhotra
