= Shukrawar Peth Assembly constituency =

Former seat in the Maharashtra Legislative Assembly (1962-77)

Coordinates: 18.51°N 73.86°E

Shukrawar Peth
- Former constituency for the Maharashtra Legislative Assembly

Constituency details
- Country: India
- Region: Western India
- State: Maharashtra
- Lok Sabha constituency: Pune
- Established: 1955
- Abolished: 1976

Shukrawar Peth Vidhan Sabha seat was one of the seats in Maharashtra Legislative Assembly in India, from 1962 to 1977. It was a segment of Pune Lok Sabha constituency. The Vidhan Sabha seat was made defunct after the constituency map of India was redrawn around 1975.

== Members of Assembly ==
Year	Member	Party
1957	Shreedhar Joshi	Praja Socialist Party
1962	Rambhau Telang	Indian National Congress
1967	Rambhau Mhalgi	Bharatiya Jana Sangh
1972	Rambhau Mhalgi	Bharatiya Jana Sangh
1978 onwards: Constituency defunct

== Election results ==
=== Assembly Election 1972 ===
1972 Maharashtra Legislative Assembly election : Shukrawar Peth
Party	Candidate	Votes	%	±%
ABJS	Rambhau Mhalgi	41,792	50.15%	▼7.23
INC	Vasant Thorat	40,195	48.23%	▲22.27
SS	Babyrao Rajput	748	0.90%	New
Independent	Shreekanth Nargolkar	606	0.73%	New
Margin of victory		1,597	1.92%	▼29.50
Turnout		84,608	74.03%	▼1.96
Total valid votes		83,341		
Registered electors		1,14,282		▲49.21
ABJS hold		Swing	▼7.23	

=== Assembly Election 1967 ===
1967 Maharashtra Legislative Assembly election : Shukrawar Peth
Party	Candidate	Votes	%	±%
ABJS	Rambhau Mhalgi	31,265	57.38%	▲52.60
INC	B. P. Apte	14,146	25.96%	▼27.82
SSP	L. G. Sahasrabudhe	3,784	6.94%	New
PSP	L. B. Kotwal	2,938	5.39%	▼31.04
Independent	P. B. Jog	1,643	3.02%	New
Independent	S. B. Kamble	715	1.31%	New
Margin of victory		17,119	31.42%	▲14.07
Turnout		58,207	76.00%	▲12.64
Total valid votes		54,491		
Registered electors		76,590		▼8.22
ABJS gain from INC		Swing	▲3.60	

=== Assembly Election 1962 ===
1962 Maharashtra Legislative Assembly election : Shukrawar Peth
Party	Candidate	Votes	%	±%
INC	Rambhau Vithal Telang	28,434	53.78%	▲6.77
PSP	Shreedhar Mahadev Joshi	19,263	36.43%	▼16.55
ABJS	Narayan Laxman Soman	2,524	4.77%	New
PWPI	Dattatraya Sakharam Lad	1,294	2.45%	New
Independent	Abaji Mahadev Dhande	1,211	2.29%	New
Margin of victory		9,171	17.35%	▲11.38
Turnout		55,608	66.64%	▼14.75
Total valid votes		52,870		
Registered electors		83,449		▲22.22
INC gain from PSP		Swing	▲0.80	

=== Assembly Election 1957 ===
1957 Bombay State Legislative Assembly election : Shukrawar Peth
Party	Candidate	Votes	%	±%
PSP	Shreedhar Mahadev Joshi	28,258	52.98%	New
INC	Sanas Baburao Narayanrao	25,075	47.02%	New
Margin of victory		3,183	5.97%	
Turnout		53,333	78.11%	
Total valid votes		53,333		
Registered electors		68,280		
PSP win (new seat)				

== See also ==
- List of constituencies of Maharashtra Legislative Assembly
