= People's Guard =

People's Guard can mean:

- People's Guard WRN, a socialist armed organisation in Poland during World War II, organised by the Polish Socialist Party
- People's Guard PPR, a communist armed organisation in Poland during World War II, organised by the Soviet-created Polish Workers Party
- People's Guard (Libya), part of Muammar Gaddafi's regime in Libya
- People's Guard of Georgia, a volunteer force of Georgian civilians who resisted the Red Army invasion in February 1921.
- Volkswehr, a former name for the Austrian Armed Forces

== See also ==
- People's Guardian, an Indian political party
