= Lonkar =

Lonkar is a surname. Notable people with the surname include:

- Prateeksha Lonkar (born 1968), Indian Marathi film and television actress
- Suryakant Lonkar (fl. 1995–1999), Indian politician
- Tanvi Ganesh Lonkar (born 1995), Indian film and television actress
