= Pradeep Rawat (politician) =

Indian politician

Member of the Indian Parliament for Pune
- Preceded by: Vitthal Tupe
- Succeeded by: Suresh Kalmadi

Personal details
- Born: 22 September 1956 (age 70) Erandol, Bombay State, India
- Party: Bharatiya Janata Party
- Spouse: Asha Pradeep Rawat
- Education: Pune University

Pradeep Trimbak Rawat (Marathi: प्रदीप त्रिंबक रावत; born 22 September 1956) is an Indian politician from the Bharatiya Janata Party and a former member of parliament (MP), elected from Pune (Lok Sabha constituency) in 1999 to the 13th Lok Sabha. He contested from Pune again in 2004 but lost to Suresh Kalmadi of Congress.
