= Shashikant Sutar =

Indian politician

Shshikant Sutar

Cabinet Minister for Agriculture and Water Conservation, Government of Maharashtra
- In office 1995–1999

Member of Legislative Assembly Shivajinagar
- In office 1990–1999
- Preceded by: Anna Joshi
- Succeeded by: Vinayak Nimhan
- Constituency: Shivajinagar

Personal details
- Party: Shiv Sena
- Occupation: Politician

Shshikant Sutar is an Indian politician and member of the Shiv Sena. He was the member of the Maharashtra Legislative Assembly in 1990 and 1995 from the Shivajinagar Assembly Constituency in Pune.

== Positions held ==
- 1990: Elected to Maharashtra Legislative Assembly
- 1995: Elected to Maharashtra Legislative Assembly
- 1995: Cabinet Minister for Agriculture and Water Conservation, Government of Maharashtra
- 2018: Appointed as Deputy Leader of Shiv Sena Party
