= Pune Cantonment Assembly constituency =

Constituency of the Maharashtra legislative assembly in India

Coordinates: 18.4974826°N 73.8776156°E

Pune Cantonment
- Constituency No. 214 for the Maharashtra Legislative Assembly

Constituency details
- Country: India
- Region: Western India
- State: Maharashtra
- District: Pune
- Lok Sabha constituency: Pune
- Established: 1957
- Total electors: 295,520
- Reservation: SC

Member of Legislative Assembly
- 15th Maharashtra Legislative Assembly
- Incumbent Sunil Kamble
- Party: Bharatiya Janata Party
- Elected year: 2024

Pune Cantonment Assembly constituency is one of the twenty one constituencies of Maharashtra Vidhan Sabha located in Pune district. and one of eight in Pune City.

It is a part of Pune Lok Sabha constituency along with five other assembly constituencies, viz Kasba Peth, Parvati, Shivajinagar, Kothurd, and Vadgaon Sheri from Pune. Sunil Kamble, the current MLA of Pune Cantonment Assembly Constituency is from Bharatiya Janata Party.

== Members of the Legislative Assembly ==
Year	Member	Party
1957	Vitthal Shivarkar	Praja Socialist Party
1962	Krishnarao Girme	Indian National Congress
1967	Krishnarao Girme	Indian National Congress
1972	Shivajirao Dhere	Indian National Congress
1978	Vitthal Tupe	Janata Party
1980	Vitthal Tupe	Janata Party
1985	Vitthal Tupe	Janata Party
1990	Balasaheb alias Chandrakant Shivarkar	Indian National Congress
1995	Suryakant Lonkar	Shiv Sena
1999	Balasaheb alias Chandrakant Shivarkar	Indian National Congress
2004	Balasaheb alias Chandrakant Shivarkar	Indian National Congress
2009	Ramesh Bagwe	Indian National Congress
2014	Dilip Kamble	Bharatiya Janata Party
2019	Sunil Kamble	Bharatiya Janata Party
2024	Sunil Kamble	Bharatiya Janata Party

== Election results ==
=== Assembly Election 2024 ===
2024 Maharashtra Legislative Assembly election : Pune Cantonment
Party	Candidate	Votes	%	±%
BJP	Sunil Kamble	76,032	49.00%	▲7.00
INC	Ramesh Anandrao Bagwe	65,712	42.35%	▲4.39
VBA	Nilesh Suresh Alhat	8,869	5.72%	▼2.36
NOTA	None of the Above	1,815	1.17%	▼0.75
BSP	Mahesh Jagtap (Alias) Maharaj	1,023	0.66%	▼1.01
Margin of victory		10,320	6.65%	▲2.62
Turnout		156,967	53.12%	▲9.89
Total valid votes		155,152		
Registered electors		295,520		▲1.40
BJP hold		Swing	▲7.00	

=== Assembly Election 2019 ===
2019 Maharashtra Legislative Assembly election : Pune Cantonment
Party	Candidate	Votes	%	±%
BJP	Sunil Kamble	52,160	42.00%	▲1.82
INC	Ramesh Anandrao Bagwe	47,148	37.97%	▲8.77
VBA	Laxman Arde	10,026	8.07%	New
AIMIM	Heena Shafique Momin	6,142	4.95%	New
MNS	Manisha Satish Sarode (Bhise)	3,075	2.48%	▼8.28
NOTA	None of the Above	2,388	1.92%	▲0.59
BSP	Chalwadi Hulgesh Mariappa	2,069	1.67%	▼0.53
Margin of victory		5,012	4.04%	▼6.95
Turnout		126,611	43.44%	▼3.99
Total valid votes		124,186		
Registered electors		291,454		▼0.23
BJP hold		Swing	▲1.82	

=== Assembly Election 2014 ===
2014 Maharashtra Legislative Assembly election : Pune Cantonment
Party	Candidate	Votes	%	±%
BJP	Dilip Kamble	54,692	40.18%	New
INC	Ramesh Anandrao Bagwe	39,737	29.19%	▼28.19
SS	Parshuram Balkrushna Wadekar	16,508	12.13%	▼12.62
MNS	Ajay Maganlal Tayade	14,642	10.76%	New
NCP	Bhagwan Shivram Vairat	5,295	3.89%	New
BSP	Ahire Milind Datta	2,994	2.20%	▼1.08
NOTA	None of the Above	1,818	1.34%	New
Margin of victory		14,955	10.99%	▼21.64
Turnout		138,000	47.24%	▲10.66
Total valid votes		136,114		
Registered electors		292,125		▼8.24
BJP gain from INC		Swing	▼17.20	

=== Assembly Election 2009 ===
2009 Maharashtra Legislative Assembly election : Pune Cantonment
Party	Candidate	Votes	%	±%
INC	Ramesh Anandrao Bagwe	65,638	57.38%	▲0.73
SS	Sadanand Krishna Shetty	28,313	24.75%	▼13.64
RPI(A)	Rohidas Gajanan Gaikwad	5,093	4.45%	New
Independent	Vivek Bansode	4,950	4.33%	New
BSP	Oval Kailash Baban	3,749	3.28%	▲0.63
Republican Party of India (Democratic)	Bapusaheb Sadashiv Bhosale	1,938	1.69%	New
Independent	Lakhan Alias Laxman Baban Jawale	953	0.83%	New
Margin of victory		37,325	32.63%	▲14.37
Turnout		114,395	35.93%	▼6.32
Total valid votes		114,386		
Registered electors		318,346		▼25.14
INC hold		Swing	▲0.73	

=== Assembly Election 2004 ===
2004 Maharashtra Legislative Assembly election : Pune Cantonment
Party	Candidate	Votes	%	±%
INC	Balasaheb Alias Chandrakant Shivarkar	101,802	56.66%	▲14.92
SS	Leelavati Vithal Tupe	68,984	38.39%	▲13.67
BSP	Kureshi Abdul Bari	4,762	2.65%	New
Margin of victory		32,818	18.26%	▲9.09
Turnout		179,718	42.26%	▼7.62
Total valid votes		179,684		
Registered electors		425,267		▲48.13
INC hold		Swing	▲14.92	

=== Assembly Election 1999 ===
1999 Maharashtra Legislative Assembly election : Pune Cantonment
Party	Candidate	Votes	%	±%
INC	Balasaheb Alias Chandrakant Shivarkar	59,755	41.74%	▼1.01
NCP	Kailasrao Kodre	46,617	32.56%	New
SS	Suryakant Lonkar	35,390	24.72%	▼19.40
Margin of victory		13,138	9.18%	▲7.81
Turnout		148,968	51.89%	▼14.80
Total valid votes		143,172		
Registered electors		287,085		▲5.01
INC gain from SS		Swing	▼2.38	

=== Assembly Election 1995 ===
1995 Maharashtra Legislative Assembly election : Pune Cantonment
Party	Candidate	Votes	%	±%
SS	Suryakant Lonkar	78,000	44.12%	▲35.33
INC	Balasaheb Alias Chandrakant Shivarkar	75,580	42.75%	▼10.71
JD	Ram D. Tupe	8,693	4.92%	▼32.16
BSP	Irani Sheriyar Behram	4,585	2.59%	New
BBM	Kureshi Asifali Khairatali	2,414	1.37%	New
Independent	Shaikh Ismail Shaikh Ibrahim Machhiwale	1,589	0.90%	New
Independent	Lt. Col. Gulabrao Dadoba Jadhav	1,364	0.77%	New
Margin of victory		2,420	1.37%	▼15.01
Turnout		180,427	66.00%	▲2.43
Total valid votes		176,806		
Registered electors		273,394		▲26.71
SS gain from INC		Swing	▼9.34	

=== Assembly Election 1990 ===
1990 Maharashtra Legislative Assembly election : Pune Cantonment
Party	Candidate	Votes	%	±%
INC	Balasaheb Alias Chandrakant Shivarkar	71,789	53.46%	▲5.40
JD	Vitthal Tupe	49,797	37.08%	New
SS	Prakash Devale	11,793	8.78%	New
Margin of victory		21,992	16.38%	▲16.19
Turnout		135,945	63.01%	▼1.46
Total valid votes		134,291		
Registered electors		215,760		▲47.36
INC gain from JP		Swing	▲5.21	

=== Assembly Election 1985 ===
1985 Maharashtra Legislative Assembly election : Pune Cantonment
Party	Candidate	Votes	%	±%
JP	Vitthal Tupe	44,997	48.25%	▲7.36
INC	Balasaheb Alias Chandrakant Shivarkar	44,820	48.06%	New
Independent	Ambedkar Gangadhar Govind	1,788	1.92%	New
Margin of victory		177	0.19%	▼3.21
Turnout		94,614	64.62%	▲8.90
Total valid votes		93,263		
Registered electors		146,417		▲17.75
JP hold		Swing	▲7.36	

=== Assembly Election 1980 ===
1980 Maharashtra Legislative Assembly election : Pune Cantonment
Party	Candidate	Votes	%	±%
JP	Vitthal Tupe	27,860	40.89%	▼11.41
INC(I)	Shivajirao Krishnaji Ghule	25,546	37.49%	New
INC(U)	Jaysingh Sasane	12,631	18.54%	New
BJP	Anantrao Bajirao Tupe	2,101	3.08%	New
Margin of victory		2,314	3.40%	▼3.36
Turnout		69,235	55.68%	▼10.45
Total valid votes		68,138		
Registered electors		124,345		▲22.13
JP hold		Swing	▼11.41	

=== Assembly Election 1978 ===
1978 Maharashtra Legislative Assembly election : Pune Cantonment
Party	Candidate	Votes	%	±%
JP	Vitthal Tupe	34,737	52.29%	New
INC	Jaisingh Ganpat Sasane	30,251	45.54%	▼13.48
Independent	Chavan Chandrakant Narayan	914	1.38%	New
Margin of victory		4,486	6.75%	▼25.75
Turnout		67,782	66.57%	▲5.92
Total valid votes		66,428		
Registered electors		101,813		▲16.25
JP gain from INC		Swing	▼6.72	

=== Assembly Election 1972 ===
1972 Maharashtra Legislative Assembly election : Pune Cantonment
Party	Candidate	Votes	%	±%
INC	Shivajirao Dhere	30,661	59.02%	▲22.58
SSP	Ram D. Tupe	13,773	26.51%	New
ABJS	Shankar Malanna Yadav	4,241	8.16%	▼2.03
RPI(K)	Salave Rajmurti	3,278	6.31%	New
Margin of victory		16,888	32.51%	▲27.74
Turnout		52,920	60.42%	▼1.05
Total valid votes		51,953		
Registered electors		87,580		▲29.08
INC hold		Swing	▲22.58	

=== Assembly Election 1967 ===
1967 Maharashtra Legislative Assembly election : Pune Cantonment
Party	Candidate	Votes	%	±%
INC	Krishnarao Tukaram Girme	14,924	36.44%	▼16.65
SSP	Ram D. Tupe	12,972	31.67%	New
Independent	A. Sangtani	6,949	16.97%	New
ABJS	Shankar Malanna Yadav	4,176	10.20%	▲3.31
Independent	S. B. Alhat	1,227	3.00%	New
SWA	K. R. Koshiti	421	1.03%	▼4.29
Margin of victory		1,952	4.77%	▼28.71
Turnout		44,037	64.90%	▲9.03
Total valid votes		40,960		
Registered electors		67,851		▲5.48
INC hold		Swing	▼16.65	

=== Assembly Election 1962 ===
1962 Maharashtra Legislative Assembly election : Pune Cantonment
Party	Candidate	Votes	%	±%
INC	Krishnarao Tukaram Girme	17,529	53.08%	▲14.59
PSP	Jaysing Ganpat Sasane	6,474	19.61%	▼27.46
RPI	Ambaram Shivram Kambale	2,494	7.55%	New
ABJS	Keshavdeo Shankarlal Agarwal	2,275	6.89%	New
SWA	Manilal Bhaichand Parekh	1,756	5.32%	New
Independent	Dashrath Sawalaram Gaikwa	1,600	4.85%	New
Independent	Ramchandra Sadashiv Gaikwad	771	2.33%	New
Margin of victory		11,055	33.48%	▲24.91
Turnout		34,542	53.70%	▼13.78
Total valid votes		33,021		
Registered electors		64,323		▲47.33
INC gain from PSP		Swing	▲6.02	

=== Assembly Election 1957 ===
1957 Bombay State Legislative Assembly election : Pune Cantonment
Party	Candidate	Votes	%	±%
PSP	Vithal Namdeo Shivarkar	13,380	47.07%	New
INC	Popattlal Ramchand Shah	10,944	38.50%	New
Independent	Siddiqui Habibuddin Sabahuddin	4,104	14.44%	New
Margin of victory		2,436	8.57%	
Turnout		28,428	65.12%	
Total valid votes		28,428		
Registered electors		43,658		
PSP win (new seat)				
