= Indian Youth Congress (Socialist) =

Political party youth wing

The Indian Youth Congress (Socialist) was the youth wing of Indian Congress (Socialist). Suresh Kalmadi was the president of IYC(S) 1981–1986.
