= Indira Anant Maydeo =

Indian parliamentarian

Member of the 1st Lok Sabha for Pune South
- In office 1951–1957
- Preceded by: New constituency
- Succeeded by: Narayan Ganesh Gore

Personal details
- Born: 7 September 1903
- Party: Indian National Congress

Indira Anant Maydeo was an Indian parliamentarian who represented Pune South in the 1st Lok Sabha as a member of the Indian National Congress.

== Early life ==
Born on 7 September 1903, Maydeo attended the Fergusson College, from where she received her B.Sc. degree.

== Career ==
Maydeo was actively involved in the Indian independence movement and was a member of the Indian National Congress (INC). In 1933, she joined the Maharashtra division of Harijan Sevak Sangh. She was the most prominent women member of the party in Pune (then in Bombay State) and when the first general elections of independent India were held, the INC made her its official candidate for Pune South constituency. Maydeo obtained roughly 64% of the votes cast and defeated the Socialist Party candidate Shridhar Limaye to become the first women representative of Pune in the house. She still holds this record. As a Member of Parliament, she brought a bill in the Lok Sabha concerning divorce but it was not discussed and eventually lapsed. Maydeo became the president of National Students' Union of India in 1952.

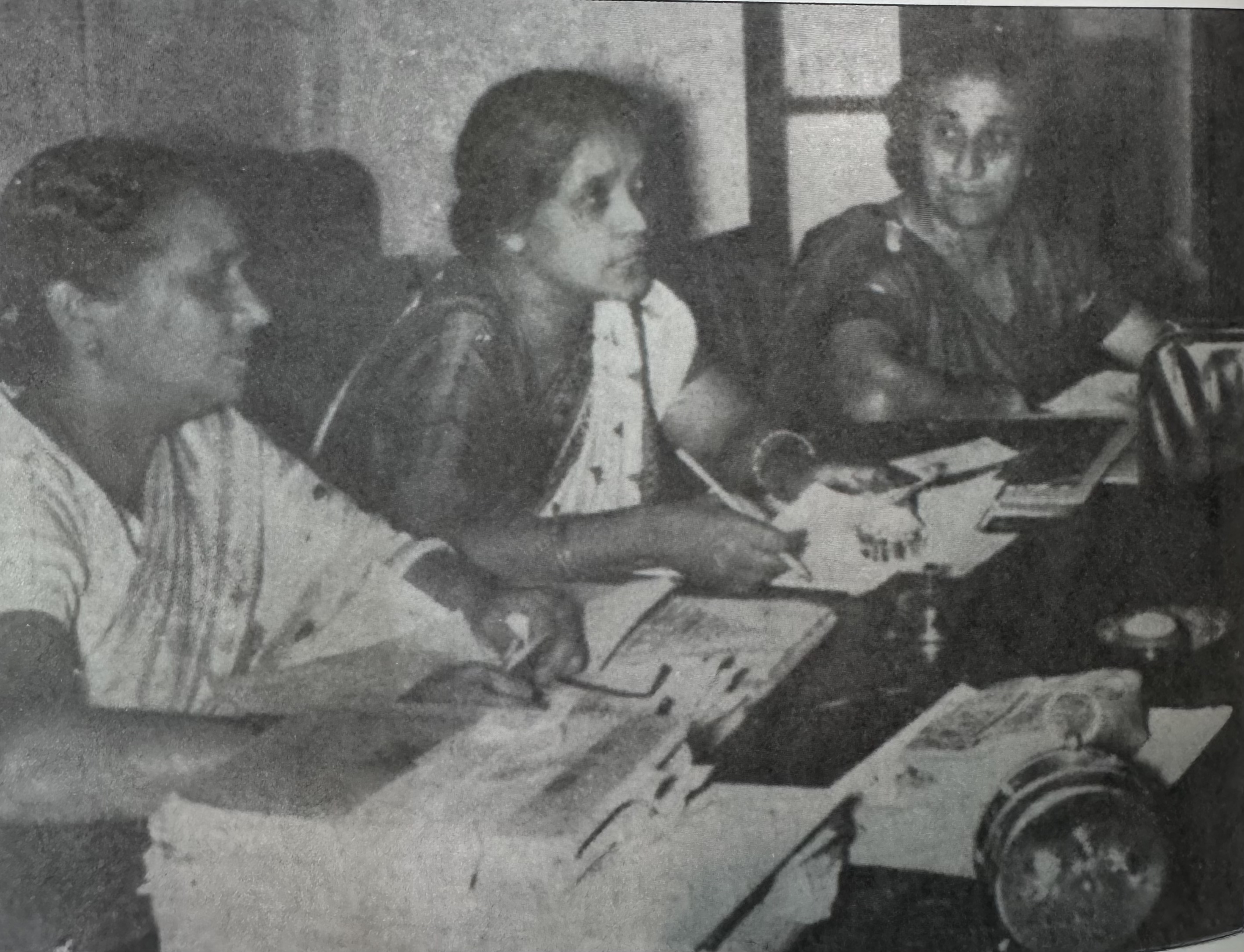
All India Women's Conference Meeting 1953. L-R: Mrs Indira Anant Maydeo (Secretary), Mrs Renuka Ray (President), Mrs Meherbeen Zhabwala (Treasurer)

She then served as the secretary of the All India Women's Conference from 1953-1954.

== Personal life ==
Indira married Anant Govind Maydeo in 1927, from whom she had one son and three daughters.
