= Rambhau Mhalgi =

Indian politician (1921–1982)

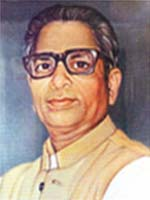

Shukrawar Peth Vidhan Sabha Seat (defunct)
- In office 1967, 1972 – 1977
- Preceded by: Rambhau Vithal Telang
- Succeeded by: (constituency abolished)

Member of Parliament, Lok Sabha
- In office 1977, 1980 – 1982
- Preceded by: (did not exist)
- Succeeded by: Jagannath Patil
- Constituency: Thane

Personal details
- Born: 9 July 1921 Kadus, Pune, Maharashtra, India
- Died: 6 March 1982 (aged 60)
- Party: Bharatiya Jana Sangh (BJS); Bharatiya Janata Party (BJP)
- Spouse: Vijaya

Ramchandra Kashinath Mhalgi (1921-1982), commonly known as Rambhau Mhalgi, was an Indian politician and a member of the Lok Sabha.

== Early life and education ==
He was born in on 9 July 1921 to Kashinathpant and Sarasvatibai in Kadus, Pune district. He joined the Sarasvati Mandir School in Pune and matriculated in 1939. He earned LLB and MA, as well as cleared the bar council exam. He was regional secretary of the RSS in 1950-54. He was also involved with running the Akhil Bharatiya Vidyarthi Parishad (ABVP), the student wing of RSS. On urging of the Rashtriya Swayamsevak Sangh (RSS), he went to Kerala as a RSS pracharak.

== Political career ==
Mhalgi belonged to Bharatiya Janata Party and its earlier variants like Jana Sangh until 1977 and Janata Party from 1977 to 1980.

He contested the 1957 Bombay Legislative Assembly elections as a member of Samyukta Maharashtra Samiti won the from Maval constituency, and served as opposition leader in the Bombay Legislature. He contested the 1962 Maharashtra Legislative Assembly election from Shivajinagar (Vidhan Sabha constituency) but lost to Sadashiv Govind Barve.

He was elected to Maharashtra Vidhan Sabha as a member of Bharatiya Jana Sangh in 1967 and 1972 from Shukrawar Peth Vidhan Sabha Seat (now defunct).

He was arrested under Maintenance of Internal Security Act (MISA) during the emergency in 1976.

Later, he was elected to the Lok Sabha from Thane in Maharashtra state as a Bharatiya Lok Dal candidate in 1977 and Janata Party candidate in 1980. When the erstwhile Jana sangh faction broke away from Janata Party, and formed Bharatiya Janata Party (BJP), Mhalgi was named the first president of BJP's Maharashtra state unit.

== Legacy ==
Rambhau Mhalgi Prabodhini (RMP) in Mumbai is a training and research institute that focuses on leadership development and socio-political research. It was established in 1982 after his death.

Secondary Schools in Katraj and Kadus, roads in Thane & Pune are named after him.

== Personal life ==
Mhalgi died on 6 March 1982. He was married to Vijaya, who died of old age in Pune in 2011. He has a son named Jayant.
