= Vinay Sahasrabuddhe =

Indian politician (born 1957)

Dr. Vinay Sahasrabuddhe
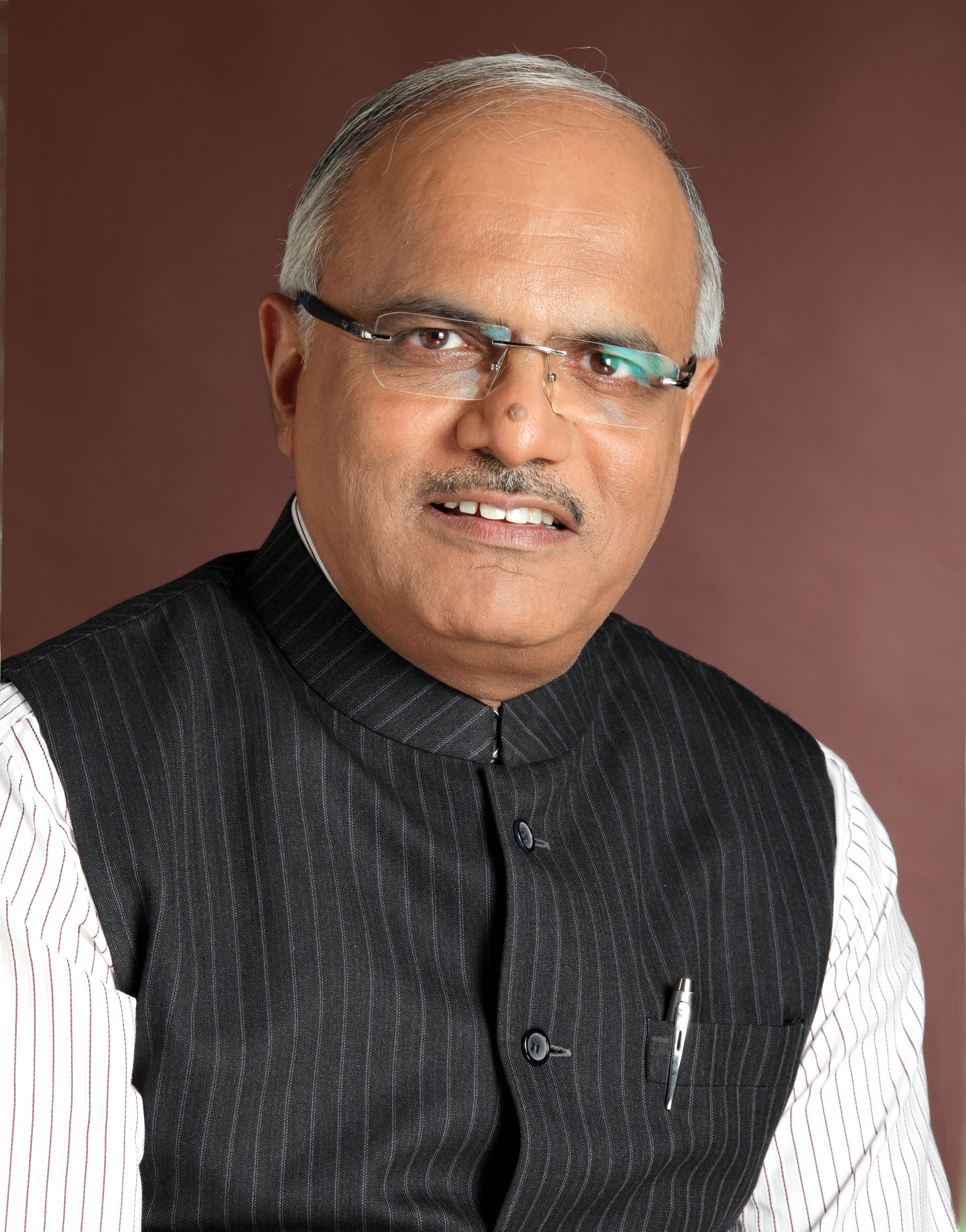

President, Indian Council for Cultural Relations
- In office 29 December 2017 – 31 December 2023
- Preceded by: Lokesh Chandra

Member of Parliament, Rajya Sabha
- In office 5 July 2016 – 5 July 2022
- Succeeded by: Anil Sukhdevrao Bonde

Personal details
- Born: 10 November 1957 (age 68) Nashik, Bombay State, India
- Party: Bharatiya Janata Party
- Spouse: Nayana Sahasrabuddhe
- Children: 1
- Education: Ph.D.
- Alma mater: University of Pune
- Website: vinaysahasrabuddhe.in

Vinay Prabhakar Sahasrabuddhe is an Indian politician. He was a Member of the Parliament of India and represented the state of Maharashtra in the Rajya Sabha from 2016 to 2022. He has also served as National Vice President of Bharatiya Janata Party from August 2014 – September 2020. Dr. Sahasrabuddhe, since 2018 has been appointed as President of Indian Council for Cultural Relations. He is known as a political scholar and an occasional columnist. He is the Vice Chairman of Rambhau Mhalgi Prabodhini, a research and training academy for elected representatives & social activists. As Member of Parliament (Rajya Sabha), he has also served as the Chairman of the Parliamentary Standing Committee on Education, Women, Children and Youth & Sports. He is regarded as one of the foremost intellectuals from the BJP, the ruling party in the Central Government and the Rashtriya Swayamsevak Sangh (RSS), a Hindu Nationalist organization.

== Early life and education ==
Dr. Sahasrabuddhe was born in a middle-class Marathi family on 10 November 1957 in Nashik. He started his schooling in Dhule, a native place of Sahasrabuddhes and later at Trimbak Vidya Mandir near Nashik. While in 4th standard, he gave a competitive examination and got selected for Government Public School, Nashik (Shaskiya Vidya Niketan).

In February 2009, Sahasrabuddhe was awarded a Ph.D. for his thesis, for his thesis "Political Parties as Victims of Populism and Electoral Compulsions: A Quest for Systemic Solutions", by the University of Mumbai.

== Political career ==
He started his career in public life with Akhil Bharatiya Vidyarthi Parishad (ABVP), a student's organization ideologically connected with Rashtriya Swayamsevak Sangh (RSS). He worked as a full-time activist of ABVP during 1983 to 1985. He also served as ABVP's National Secretary between 1985 and 1987. In 1988, Sahasrabuddhe joined Rambhau Mhalgi Prabodhini(RMP) as its first principal functionary. Later he served the organisation as Director General between 2000 - 2016. For over 18 years, he was a Member of Senate of the University of Mumbai. He also served as Member of the Board of Governors of Sardar Patel Institute of Public Administration in Ahmedabad. In May 2002, he led a Goodwill Mission of Indian Voluntary Organisations to Afghanistan.

He is a senior BJP leader and behind the scene, he is considered as one of the key members of Bharatiya Janata Party (BJP)'s think tank. When Nitin Gadkari was appointed as President of BJP in the year 2009, Sahasrabuddhe served as Gadkari's Political Advisor. Within BJP, he initiated training programs for ministers from BJP-ruled states. In March 2012, his name was in news as one of the contenders for the Rajya Sabha nomination from the BJP for a seat vacated by BJP veteran late Balavant Apte. He was the member of BJP's Vision Document Committee for the 2014 Indian general election and later member of the manifesto committee in 2019. Vinay Sahasrabuddhe was also In-Charge of BJP, Madhya Pradesh. Dr. Sahasrabuddhe was also In-charge of BJP's Good Governance Department for a long time.

== Literary works ==
Dr. Sahasrabuddhe co-authored a book called The Innovation Republic, outlining key Governance Innovations during the first tenure of Prime Minister Shri Narendra Modi. He has also authored a book Beyond A Billion Ballots, which was first published on 27 June 2013 in Mumbai. The book also launched at New Delhi at the hands of Former Chief Election Commissioner of India Dr. SY Quraishi. He has been an occasional contributor to many English and Marathi language newspapers and weeklies. He has also authored few Books in Marathi language which includes Ekaki Purvanchal, a book on North-East states of India. In 1998, Sahasrabuddhe received the award for best literary work from the Government of Maharashtra for his co-edited work Nivadak Manoos, a book in Marathi language.
