= Sunil Tingre =

Indian politician

Member of Maharashtra Legislative Assembly
- In office 2019–2024
- Preceded by: Jagdish Mulik
- Succeeded by: Bapusaheb Tukaram Pathare
- Constituency: Vadgaon Sheri

Personal details
- Party: Nationalist Congress Party
- Other political affiliations: Maharashtra Navnirman Sena; Shiv Sena
- Occupation: Politician

Sunil Vijayrao Tingre is a leader of the Nationalist Congress Party and a former Member of the Maharashtra Legislative Assembly (MLA), elected from Vadgaon Sheri Assembly constituency in Pune city.

He was elected in the 2019 Maharashtra Legislative Assembly election on a Nationalist Congress Party ticket, beating the incumbent Bharatiya Janata Party MLA Jagdish Mulik by a margin of 4,956 votes.

He previously contested the 2014 Maharashtra Legislative Assembly election from Vadgaon Sheri on a Shiv Sena ticket but lost to Jagdish Tukaram Mulik of the Bharatiya Janata Party by a margin of 5,325 votes.

He was allegedly involved in Pune hit and run case and Pune police probing the role of Sunil Tingre, who allegedly used his clout to alter the investigation in the Porsche accident case, Hindustan Times reported.

== Political career ==
=== Hunger Strike Against PMC ===
Sunil Tingre launched a hunger strike on April 6, 2023, to protest the inaction of the Pune Municipal Corporation to take up basic civic infrastructure work in his constituency i.e. Vadgaon Sheri Assembly constituency. The PMC was ruled by the Bharatiya Janata Party – which is opposed to Sunil Tingre's Nationalist Congress Party – in the previous five-year term that ended in 2022 and was governed by an administrator appointed by the state government at the time of the protest.

The issues raised by Tingre included traffic congestion on Ahmednagar and Porwal roads, blocked roads, a blocked flyover at Kharadi and water problems in Shastri Nagar, Vishrantwadi and Lohegaon. He alleged that the PMC was not addressing these issues in a sufficient manner. To protest, he started a hunger strike in front of the municipal building on the morning of April 6.

Tingre was supported by several prominent local leaders like Hadapsar MLA Chetan Tupe, NCP city president Prashant Jagtap, former Mayor Dattatray Dhankawade and others. In addition, many local citizens of the constituency were also present for the event.

After discussing the issues with Sunil Tingre and the delegation, Additional Municipal Commissioner Vikas Dhakne assured them that the municipal administration is positive about solving the issues raised by Tingre. The administration also gave a written statement regarding the timeframe in which the issues will be resolved. Finally, after receiving the written assurance, Tingre ended his fast.

=== 2024 Pune Porsche car crash ===
In the 2024 Pune Porsche hit and run case on 19 May 2024, Tingre was implicated in the reinstatement of Dr. Taware, the doctor accused of tampering with evidence. Tingre had recommended Dr. Taware as head of forensics despite serious malpractices, and was in touch with him to destroy evidence against the juvenile Agarwal.

== Positions held ==
- 2019: Elected to Maharashtra Legislative Assembly.
