= Vishwas Gangurde =

Indian politician (died 2024)

Vishwas Gangurde (died 16 May 2024) was an Indian politician and member of the Bharatiya Janata Party. Gangurde was a first-term member of the Maharashtra Legislative Assembly in 1999 from the Parvati constituency assembly constituency in Pune. Gangurde died on 16 May 2024.
