= Medha Kulkarni =

Indian politician

Member of Parliament, Rajya Sabha
- Incumbent
- Assumed office 3 April 2024
- Preceded by: Prakash Javadekar
- Constituency: Maharashtra

Member of Maharashtra Legislative Assembly
- In office 2014–2019
- Preceded by: Chandrakant Mokate
- Succeeded by: Chandrakant Patil
- Constituency: Kothrud

Personal details
- Born: 30 October 1969 (age 56) Pune, Pune district, Maharashtra
- Party: Bharatiya Janata Party
- Spouse: Vishram Kulkarni (m. 1991)
- Children: 1 son, 1 daughter
- Parents: Madhukar Patankar (father); Madhuvanti Patankar (mother)
- Education: B.Sc, B.Ed, M.Ed, Ph.D
- Alma mater: Pune University
- Profession: Teacher, politician

Medha Vishram Kulkarni is an Indian politician and member of the Bharatiya Janata Party. She has served as the Member of Rajya Sabha from Maharashtra since 2024. Previously, she was Member of Vidhan Sabha from Kothrud, Maharashtra. She was awarded the Sansad Ratna award in 2025 for her performance in parliamentary duties.

In October 2025, Kulkarni caused a controversy when she used cow urine to purify Shaniwarwada.

== Political career ==
Kulkarni was a first term member of the Maharashtra Legislative Assembly from the Kothrud assembly constituency in Pune, where she won against Chandrakant Mokate of Shiv Sena (UBT). She is one of the two women members in the Maharashtra Legislative Assembly from Pune and belonging to the Bharatiya Janata Party.

== Positions held ==
- Maharashtra Legislative Assembly from Kothrud.
- Terms in office: 2014–2019.
