= Anil Shirole =

Indian politician

Anil Shirole (अनिल शिरोळे)
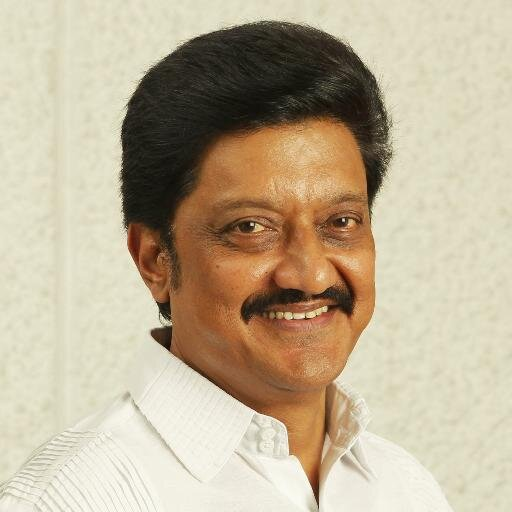

Member of the Indian Parliament for Pune
- In office May 2014 – May 2019
- Preceded by: Suresh Kalmadi
- Succeeded by: Girish Bapat
- Constituency: Pune

Personal details
- Born: 13 September 1950 (age 76) Pune, Bombay State, India
- Party: Bharatiya Janata Party
- Children: Siddharth Shirole
- Education: University of Pune
- Website: Official website

Anil Shirole, alias Padmakar Gulabrao Shirole, (born 13 September 1950), hails from the Shiledar Shirole (Patil) family. He represented Pune constituency in the 16th Lok Sabha from 2014 to 2019. He was previously a member of Pune's municipal corporation. He completed his graduation in BA from University of Pune.

== Political career ==
Anil Shirole was first elected to Pune Municipal Corporation as a BJP candidate in 1992. He was re-elected for a second term from 1997 to 2002, having been appointed leader of the BJP party in Pune in 2000.

Anil Shirole is a member of the Rashtriya Swayamsevak Sangh (RSS), a far-right Hindu nationalist paramilitary volunteer organisation.

== Timeline ==
- 1970 – President- Patit Pavan Sanghatna (Pune City)
- 1972 – Secretary- RSS Student Wings
- 1975 – Imprisoned for 1 year during Emergency under the Maintenance of Internal Security Act
- 1992 – Elected as BJP corporator for Pune Municipal Corporation
- 1997 – Re-elected and appointed member of PMC Standing Committee
- 2000 – President- Bharatiya Janata Party, Pune City
- 2002 – Leader of Opposition/Highest ever BJP corporator tally
- 2013 – President- 2nd term as Bharatiya Janata Party, Pune City
- 2014 – Elected in Pune as Member of Parliament for 16th lower house of Government of India on the ticket of Bhartiya Janata Party.
