= Vinayak Nimhan =

Indian politician (died 2022)

Member of Legislative Assembly of Maharashtra
- In office 1999–2014
- Preceded by: Shashikant Sutar
- Succeeded by: Vijay Kale
- Constituency: Shivajinagar

Personal details
- Died: 26 October 2022
- Party: Shiv Sena (Uddhav Balasaheb Thackeray)
- Relations: Chandrashekar Nimhan (Son)

Vinayak Nimhan (died 26 October 2022) was a Shiv Sena politician from Pune, Maharashtra. He was a member of the 12th Maharashtra Legislative Assembly representing the Shivajinagar Assembly Constituency. He had been elected to Maharashtra Legislative Assembly for three consecutive terms. For his first two terms, he was elected as a member of the Shiv Sena. For his third term, he was elected on the Indian National Congress ticket. Nimhan was defeated in the 2014 assembly elections. He has since then returned to the Shiv Sena.

Nimhan died from cardiac arrest on 26 October 2022, at the age of 59.

== Positions held ==
- 1999: elected to Maharashtra Legislative Assembly
- 2004: re-elected to Maharashtra Legislative Assembly
- 2009: re-elected to Maharashtra Legislative Assembly
- 2015: appointed Pune City Chief Shiv Sena

== See also ==
- Pune Lok Sabha constituency
