= Rambhau Mhalgi Prabodhini =

Indian not-for-profit organisation

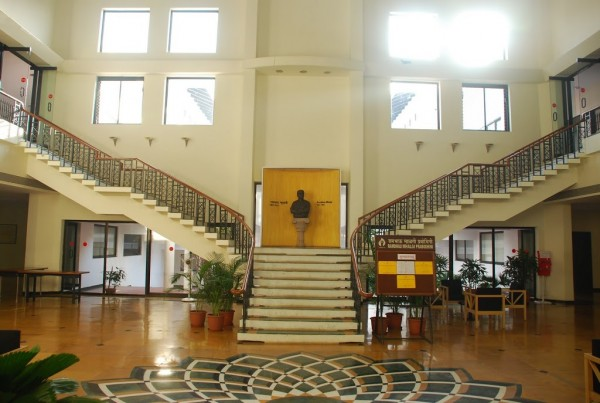
- Founded: 1982
- Type: Charitable Trust of India
- Registration no.: Registration No. 618 Bom./82
- Purpose: Government Leadership; Statesmanship; Law Making
- Location: Mumbai, Thane, Pune, New Delhi
- Chairman: Devendra Fadnavis
- Key people: Devendra Fadnavis, Vinay Sahasrabuddhe
- Website: www.rmponweb.org

Rambhau Mhalgi Prabodhini is a not-for-profit organisation established in memory of the Rambhau Mhalgi. Established in 1982, RMP is a learning and research organisation for government leadership aspirants and current government leaders of India. RMP has been granted special consultative status by the United Nations Economic and Social Council. The organization operates nationally through its offices in Delhi, Pune, Mumbai, and its headquarters in Thane. Since its establishment in 1982, RMP has trained many government leaders.

RMP is often linked with the Bharatiya Janata Party and right-wing Rashtriya Swayamsevak Sangh outfit. It is a recognized research centre by Mumbai University.

== History ==
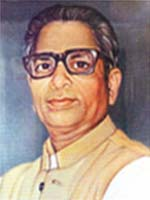
Rambhau Mhalgi

RMP government leadership training mission was implemented first at the behest of parliamentarian Rambhau Mhalgi. Mhalgi was influenced by RSS thinker and BJP leader Deendayal Upadhyaya, who had conceived the idea of a learning establishment for government leadership aspirants and current government leaders of India. In 1982, Pramod Mahajan, senior BJP leader, opened Rambhau Mhalgi Prabodhini at Keshav Srushti campus at Uttan village, near Bhayandar.

In January 2020, the Congress party objected to training government officials at RMP citing right-wing political leaning of RMP.
