= Jagdish Mulik =

Indian politician

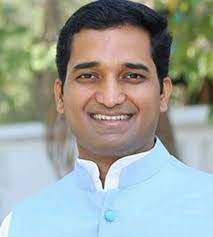

Member of Maharashtra Legislative Assembly
- In office 2014–2019
- Preceded by: Bapusaheb Pathare
- Succeeded by: Sunil Tingre
- Constituency: Vadgaon Sheri

President of Bharatiya Janata Party – Pune City
- In office 29 January 2020 – 19 July 2023
- President: Chandrakant Patil; Chandrashekhar Bawankule
- Preceded by: Madhuri Misal
- Succeeded by: Dheeraj Ghate

Personal details
- Political party: Bharatiya Janata Party

Jagdish Tukaram Mulik is an Indian politician and a member of the Bharatiya Janata Party. He was first elected to the Maharashtra Legislative Assembly in 2014, representing the Vadgaon Sheri constituency assembly in Pune.

In the 2019 Maharashtra Legislative Assembly election, Mulik was defeated by Sunil Tingre of the Nationalist Congress Party in the same constituency, losing by a margin of nearly 5,000 votes.
