= Narayan Ganesh Gore =

Indian politician (1907–1993)

His Excellency Narayan Ganesh Goray
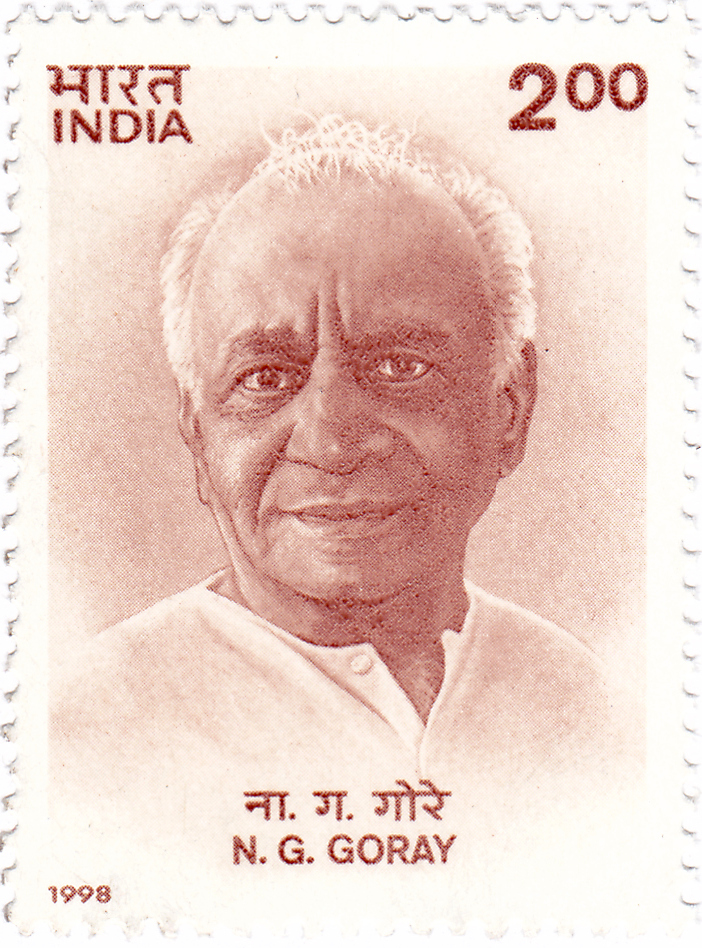
- Goray on a 1998 stamp of India

High Commissioner of India to the United Kingdom
- In office 1977 - 1979
- Preceded by: Braj Kumar Nehru
- Succeeded by: V.A. Seyid Muhammad

Member of Parliament, Lok Sabha
- In office 1957 - 1962
- Preceded by: Indira Anant Maydeo
- Succeeded by: Shankarrao More
- Constituency: Pune

Member of Parliament, Rajya Sabha
- In office 1970 - 1976
- Constituency: Maharashtra

Mayor of Pune
- In office 1967 - 1968
- Preceded by: Bhausaheb Shirole
- Succeeded by: Bhausaheb Sonba Anaji Chavan

Personal details
- Born: 1907
- Died: 1 May 1993 (aged 85–86)
- Party: Praja Socialist Party
- Other political affiliations: Indian National Congress; Congress Socialist Party
- Education: B.A. LLB
- Occupation: Politician, diplomat, writer

Narayan Ganesh Goray (1907–1 May 1993) was a socialist leader and Marathi writer from Maharashtra, India. He served as the 9th High Commissioner of India to the United Kingdom from 1977 to 1979

== Early life ==
He was born in the town of Hindale in Konkan. He received his school and college education in Pune to earn a degree in law.

== Career ==
Since his college days, Gore participated in India's struggle for independence under Mahatma Gandhi's leadership from the British Raj. In 1942, he suffered imprisonment by the British authorities for his participation in the struggle.

After India's independence in 1947, Gore served as member of 2nd Lok Sabha in 1957–62, the mayor of Pune in 1967–68; as a member of Rajya Sabha in Indian parliament during 1970–76; and as the High Commissioner of India to the United Kingdom during 1977–79. He was the president of the Indian socialist party for many years.

From 26 January 1981 to 12 January 1984, Gore served as the editor of the weekly Sadhana (weekly) (साधना).

== Literary work ==
Gore wrote short stories; political and nonpolitical essays; and travelogues. He also translated two important works. In all, he wrote more than 25 books. The following is a partial list of the titles of his books:

=== Collections of short stories and nonpolitical essays ===
- Karavande (करवंदे) (1953)
- Seeteche Pohe (सीतेचे पोहे) (1953)
- Dali (डाली) (1956)
- Gulabashi (गुलबशी) (1959)
- Shankh Ani Shimpale (शंख आणि शिंपले) (1964)
- Chinarachya Chhayet (चिनारच्या छायेत) (1969)
- Kahi Pane, Kahi Phule (काही पाने, काही फुले) (1983)
- Karavande (करवंदे) is a collection of Gore's letters to his young daughter.
- Seeteche Pohe (सीतेचे पोहे) is a collection of Gore's short stories.

Shaap Ani AShaap

=== Translations ===
- Jawaharlal Nehru's autobiography, and also its abridged version for children
- Kalidas's Sanskrit poetic work Meghdoot (मेघदूत) (translated in verse form) (1956)
- Sarvepalli Radhakrishnan's edited work translated as Gandhijinche Wiwidh Darshan (गांधीजींचे विविधदर्शन)

=== Collections of political essays ===
- Karagruhachya Bhinti (कारागृहाच्या भिंती) (1942)
- Samajawadach Ka? (समाजवादच का?) (1948)
- Bharatachi Purwa Sarahadda (भारताची पूर्व सरहद्द) (1953)
- Tapu Lagalela Himalay (तापू लागलेला हिमालय) (1953)
- Samrajyashahi Va Wishwa Kutumbawad (साम्राज्यशाही व विश्वकुटुंबवाद)
