= Shanti Narayan Naik =

Indian politician

Shanti Narayan Naik was an Indian politician and member of the Janata Party. Naik was a first term member of the Maharashtra Legislative Assembly in 1978 from the Shivajinagar constituency assembly constituency in Pune.
