= Chandrakant Mokate =

Indian politician

Member of Legislative Assembly Kothrud
- In office 2009–2014
- Succeeded by: Medha Vishram Kulkarni
- Constituency: Kothrud

Deputy Mayor of the Pune Municipal Corporation
- In office 2007–2009

Personal details
- Party: Shiv Sena
- Occupation: Politician

Chandrakant Mokate is an Indian politician and member of the Shiv Sena (UBT). He was a member of the Maharashtra Legislative Assembly from the Kothrud assembly constituency in Pune.

== Positions held ==
- 2007: Elected to Pune Municipal Corporation
- 2007: Elected as Deputy Mayor of the Pune Municipal Corporation.
- 2009: Elected to Maharashtra Legislative Assembly.
