= Shankarrao More =

Indian politician

Member of Parliament, Lok Sabha
- In office 1962-1967
- Preceded by: Narayan Ganesh Goray
- Succeeded by: Shreedhar Mahadev Joshi
- Constituency: Pune, Maharashtra
- In office 1952-1957
- Constituency: Solapur, Maharashtra

Personal details
- Born: 1 August 1899 Pune, Bombay Presidency, British India
- Party: Indian National Congress
- Other political affiliations: Peasants and Workers Party of India
- Spouse: Shantabai

Shankarrao Shantaram More is an Indian politician. He was elected to the Lok Sabha, the lower house of the Parliament of India.
