= Vijay Kale =

Indian politician

Maharashtra Legislative Assembly
- In office 2014–2019
- Preceded by: Vinayak Nimhan
- Succeeded by: Siddharth Shirole
- Constituency: Shivajinagar

Personal details
- Party: Bharatiya Janata Party
- Occupation: Politician
- Website: mahabjp.org

Vijay Jaywant Kale is an Indian politician and member of the Bharatiya Janata Party. He is a first term member of the Maharashtra Legislative Assembly.

== Constituency ==
Vijay Kale was elected from the Shivajinagar assembly constituency, Maharashtra.

== Positions held ==
- Maharashtra Legislative Assembly MLA.
- Terms in office: 2014–2019.
