= Bapusaheb Pathare =

Indian politician

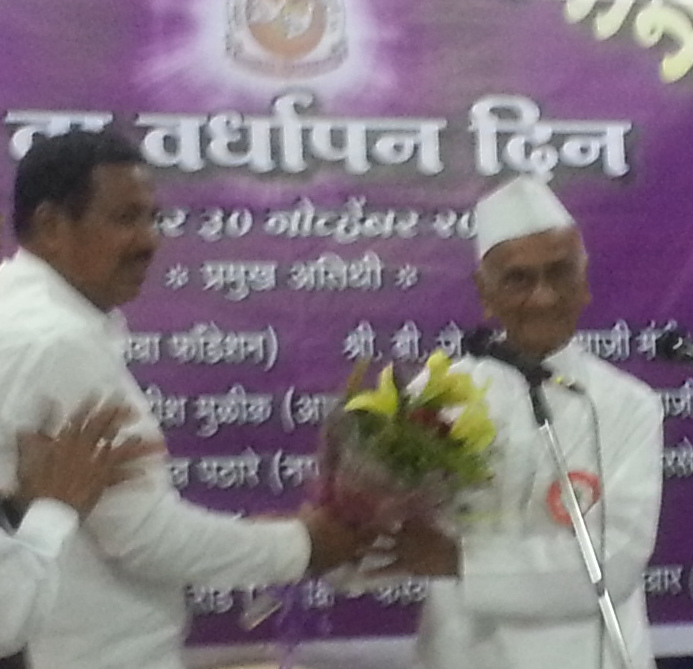
- Pathare (left) felicitating B. J. Khatal-Patil

Member of Maharashtra Legislative Assembly
- Incumbent
- Assumed office 2024
- Preceded by: Sunil Tingre
- In office 2009–2014
- Preceded by: Constituency created
- Succeeded by: Jagdish Tukaram Mulik
- Constituency: Vadgaon Sheri

Personal details
- Party: NCP-SP (2024-Present)
- Other political affiliations: Bharatiya Janata Party (2019-2024); Nationalist Congress Party (till 2019)
- Children: Surendra Pathare

Bapusaheb Tukaram Pathare (also known as Bapu Pathare and Bapusaheb Pathare) is an Indian politician and a former member of the Maharashtra Legislative Assembly. He served as the first corporator of Kharadi and was a member of the district council of Pune. He was a chairperson of the Pune Municipal Corporation. He was elected to the Maharashtra Legislative Assembly in 2009 from the Vadgaon Sheri Assembly constituency. He is elected to the Maharashtra Legislative Assembly in 2024 from the Vadgaon Sheri Assembly constituency.

== Biography ==
Bapusaheb Pathare grew up in Kharadi Vadgaon Sheri, Pune. At an early age, he became a local sarpanch and then entered the Pune Municipal Corporation (PMC) and became the chairperson of its standing committee. He was the corporator of PMC by 2009 when he contested the Vadgaon Sheri constituency seat in the Maharashtra Legislative Assembly elections with a ticket from the Nationalist Congress Party. He won against Ajay Bhosale of the Shiv Sena with a margin of 33,116 votes.

Pathare was a member of the district council of Pune and the first corporator of Kharadi. He and his family are said to have a dominance in the political leadership in the suburb of Kharadi, ever since it was a gram panchayat. Kharadi was annexed to the Pune Municipal Corporation in 1997, and the Pathare family led by Bapusaheb actively participated in the city politics afterwards. Indian Express reported in March 2013 that the politics in Vadgaon Sheri is dominated by Pathare and his family, led by him.

In October 2019, Pathare joined the Bhartiya Janata Party.
