= Kadus =

Village in Maharashtra

- Village
- Location in Maharashtra, India Kadus (India)
- Coordinates: 18°53′N 73°49′E
- Country: India
- State: Maharashtra
- District: Pune district

Government
  - Type: Public
  - Body: Gram panchayat

Population
  - Total: 20,000+

Languages
  - Official: Marathi
- Time zone: UTC+5:30 (IST)
- PIN: 412404
- Telephone code: 02135
- Vehicle registration: MH-14
- Nearest city: Rajgurunagar
- Lok Sabha constituency: Shirur
- Vidhan Sabha constituency: Khed-Alandi
- Website: pune.nic.in

Kadus is a village in Khed taluka in Pune district of state of Maharashtra, India.

== See also ==
- Khed taluka
