= Dilip Kamble =

Indian politician

Member of the Maharashtra Legislative Assembly for Pune Cantonment
- In office 2014–2019
- Preceded by: Rameshanandrao Bagwe
- Succeeded by: Sunil Kamble

Personal details
- Born: 1 June 1963 (age 62) Pune, Maharashtra
- Party: Bhartiya Janata Party
- Occupation: Politician
- Website: http://www.mahabjp.org Maharashtra BJP Official Page

Dilip Dyandev Kamble (born 1 June 1963) is an Indian politician from Maharashtra. He was an MLA representing Bharatiya Janata Party in 13th Maharashtra Legislative Assembly from Pune Cantonment from 2014 to 2019.

== Early life and education ==
Kamble is from Kasaba, Pune District, Maharashtra. He is the son of Dyandev Namdev Kamble. He completed his B.A. in 1989 at Abasheb College, which is affiliated with Pune University.

== Career ==
Kamble served as a Minister of State for Social Justice and Special Assistance in the Devendra Fadnavis ministry (2014–2019). He first became an MLA winning from Pune Cantonment Assembly constituency in the 2019 Maharashtra Legislative Assembly election representing Bharatiya Janata Party which was won by his brother in 2014.

Political offices
Preceded by	Minister of State for Social Justice and Special Assistance, Maharashtra State; December 2014–present	Incumbent
Preceded by	Maharashtra State Guardian Minister for Hingoli district December 2014–present	Incumbent
