= Parvati Assembly constituency =

Constituency of the Maharashtra legislative assembly in India

Coordinates: 18.489°N 73.850°E

Parvati
- Constituency No. 212 for the Maharashtra Legislative Assembly

Constituency details
- Country: India
- Region: Western India
- State: Maharashtra
- District: Pune
- Lok Sabha constituency: Pune
- Established: 1978
- Total electors: 361,038
- Reservation: None

Member of Legislative Assembly
- 15th Maharashtra Legislative Assembly
- Incumbent Madhuri Misal
- Party: Bharatiya Janata Party
- Elected year: 2024

Parvati Assembly constituency is one of the 288 Vidhan Sabha (legislative assembly) constituencies of Maharashtra state, western India. This constituency is located in Pune district. It is part of Pune Lok Sabha constituency.

== Geographical scope ==
The constituency comprises ward nos. 27 to 30, 32 to 40, 42, 86 to 90 & 150 of Pune Municipal Corporation (PMC).

== Members of the Legislative Assembly ==
| Year | Member | Party |
|---|---|---|
| 1978 | Subhash Sarvagod | Janata Party |
| 1980 | Vasant Chavan | Indian National Congress (I) |
| 1985 | Sharad Ranpise | Indian National Congress |
| 1990 | Sharad Ranpise | Indian National Congress |
| 1995 | Dilip Kamble | Bharatiya Janata Party |
| 1999 | Vishwas Gangurde | Bharatiya Janata Party |
| 2004 | Ramesh Bagwe | Indian National Congress |
| 2009 | Madhuri Misal | Bharatiya Janata Party |
| 2014 | Madhuri Misal | Bharatiya Janata Party |
| 2019 | Madhuri Misal | Bharatiya Janata Party |
| 2024 | Madhuri Misal | Bharatiya Janata Party |

== Election results ==
=== Assembly Election 2024 ===
2024 Maharashtra Legislative Assembly election : Parvati
| Party | Candidate | Votes | % | ±% |
|---|---|---|---|---|
| BJP | Madhuri Sathish Misal | 118,193 | 58.86% | ▲1.84 |
| NCP-SP | Ashwini Nitin Kadam | 63,533 | 31.64% | New |
| Independent | Aba Bagul | 10,476 | 5.22% | New |
| VBA | Gaikwad Surekha Magardhwaj | 3,420 | 1.70% | ▼2.84 |
| NOTA | None of the Above | 2,461 | 1.23% | ▼0.93 |
| Sambhaji Brigade Party | Avinash Ashok Ghodke | 1,953 | 0.97% | New |
| Margin of victory | | 54,660 | 27.22% | ▲5.61 |
| Turnout | | 203,252 | 56.30% | ▲7.60 |
| Total valid votes | | 200,791 | | |
| Registered electors | | 361,038 | | ▲1.89 |
| BJP hold | | Swing | ▲1.84 | |

=== Assembly Election 2019 ===
2019 Maharashtra Legislative Assembly election : Parvati
| Party | Candidate | Votes | % | ±% |
|---|---|---|---|---|
| BJP | Madhuri Sathish Misal | 97,012 | 57.02% | ▲6.18 |
| NCP | Ashwini Nitin Kadam | 60,245 | 35.41% | ▲21.52 |
| VBA | Rushikesh Manohar Nangarepatil | 7,734 | 4.55% | New |
| NOTA | None of the Above | 3,668 | 2.16% | ▲1.21 |
| BSP | Ravi Kshirsagar | 1,391 | 0.82% | ▼0.07 |
| BMP | Bhagle Shatayu Sidram | 1,309 | 0.77% | New |
| Margin of victory | | 36,767 | 21.61% | ▼15.14 |
| Turnout | | 173,857 | 49.07% | ▼7.27 |
| Total valid votes | | 170,124 | | |
| Registered electors | | 354,339 | | ▲4.20 |
| BJP hold | | Swing | ▲6.18 | |

=== Assembly Election 2014 ===
2014 Maharashtra Legislative Assembly election : Parvati
| Party | Candidate | Votes | % | ±% |
|---|---|---|---|---|
| BJP | Madhuri Sathish Misal | 95,583 | 50.84% | ▲8.85 |
| SS | Taware Sachin Sham | 26,493 | 14.09% | New |
| NCP | Jagtap Subhash Digambar | 26,124 | 13.90% | ▼16.32 |
| INC | Abhay Chhajed | 21,907 | 11.65% | New |
| MNS | Sandip Babanrao Landge | 12,563 | 6.68% | ▼12.51 |
| Independent | Anil Maruti Jadhav | 1,821 | 0.97% | New |
| NOTA | None of the Above | 1,774 | 0.94% | New |
| BSP | Palkhe Ram Laxman | 1,674 | 0.89% | ▼0.40 |
| Margin of victory | | 69,090 | 36.75% | ▲24.97 |
| Turnout | | 189,767 | 55.81% | ▲9.84 |
| Total valid votes | | 187,992 | | |
| Registered electors | | 340,050 | | ▼0.09 |
| BJP hold | | Swing | ▲8.85 | |

=== Assembly Election 2009 ===
2009 Maharashtra Legislative Assembly election : Parvati
| Party | Candidate | Votes | % | ±% |
|---|---|---|---|---|
| BJP | Madhuri Sathish Misal | 64,959 | 42.00% | ▲2.80 |
| NCP | Taware Sachin Sham | 46,743 | 30.22% | New |
| MNS | Gadade Shivaji Bhiwa | 29,689 | 19.19% | New |
| CPI(M) | Kirantai Moghe | 3,216 | 2.08% | New |
| BBM | Adv.Kiran Eknath Kadam | 2,144 | 1.39% | New |
| BSP | Jadhav Vijay Bhaskar | 1,991 | 1.29% | ▼1.18 |
| Independent | Bhagwat Raghunath Kamble | 1,140 | 0.74% | New |
| Margin of victory | | 18,216 | 11.78% | ▼3.12 |
| Turnout | | 154,805 | 45.48% | ▲1.65 |
| Total valid votes | | 154,679 | | |
| Registered electors | | 340,343 | | ▼16.75 |
| BJP gain from INC | | Swing | ▼12.09 | |

=== Assembly Election 2004 ===
2004 Maharashtra Legislative Assembly election : Parvati
| Party | Candidate | Votes | % | ±% |
|---|---|---|---|---|
| INC | Bagve Ramesh Anandrao | 96,853 | 54.09% | ▲14.95 |
| BJP | Gangurde Vishwas Krishnarao | 70,179 | 39.19% | ▼2.01 |
| BSP | Sayajirao Salunkhe (Appa) | 4,414 | 2.47% | ▲1.82 |
| SP | Patel Farid Kasam | 1,766 | 0.99% | New |
| Independent | Bansode Dnyandeo Mesa | 1,633 | 0.91% | New |
| Margin of victory | | 26,674 | 14.90% | ▲12.83 |
| Turnout | | 179,077 | 43.81% | ▼5.37 |
| Total valid votes | | 179,063 | | |
| Registered electors | | 408,804 | | ▲24.29 |
| INC gain from BJP | | Swing | ▲12.88 | |

=== Assembly Election 1999 ===
1999 Maharashtra Legislative Assembly election : Parvati
| Party | Candidate | Votes | % | ±% |
|---|---|---|---|---|
| BJP | Vishwas Gangurde | 66,646 | 41.21% | ▼0.06 |
| INC | Ramesh Anantrao Alias Anadrao Bagve | 63,304 | 39.14% | ▲9.19 |
| NCP | Shewale Madhukarrao Dharmaji | 30,253 | 18.71% | New |
| BSP | Sukhdeo Rangnath Waghmare | 1,050 | 0.65% | ▼0.44 |
| Margin of victory | | 3,342 | 2.07% | ▼9.25 |
| Turnout | | 165,350 | 50.27% | ▼15.72 |
| Total valid votes | | 161,736 | | |
| Registered electors | | 328,907 | | ▲6.39 |
| BJP hold | | Swing | ▼0.06 | |

=== Assembly Election 1995 ===
1995 Maharashtra Legislative Assembly election : Parvati
| Party | Candidate | Votes | % | ±% |
|---|---|---|---|---|
| BJP | Dilip Kamble | 82,792 | 41.26% | ▲1.24 |
| INC | Sharad Ranpise | 60,087 | 29.95% | ▼17.39 |
| Independent | Ramesh Anandrao Bagave | 39,531 | 19.70% | New |
| BBM | Chandane Vaishali Rarayan | 5,316 | 2.65% | New |
| JD | Vithal Sathe | 2,290 | 1.14% | ▼9.36 |
| BSP | Rakshe Ramesh Bhimrao | 2,191 | 1.09% | ▲0.62 |
| Margin of victory | | 22,705 | 11.32% | ▲4.00 |
| Turnout | | 203,815 | 65.93% | ▲9.81 |
| Total valid votes | | 200,635 | | |
| Registered electors | | 309,160 | | ▲20.58 |
| BJP gain from INC | | Swing | ▼6.07 | |

=== Assembly Election 1990 ===
1990 Maharashtra Legislative Assembly election : Parvati
| Party | Candidate | Votes | % | ±% |
|---|---|---|---|---|
| INC | Sharad Ranpise | 66,865 | 47.34% | ▲0.78 |
| BJP | Gangurde Vishwas Krishnarao | 56,530 | 40.02% | ▲2.51 |
| JD | Ram Kamble | 14,830 | 10.50% | New |
| Independent | Kamble Sadanand Bhimrao | 1,009 | 0.71% | New |
| Margin of victory | | 10,335 | 7.32% | ▼1.72 |
| Turnout | | 142,718 | 55.66% | ▲1.55 |
| Total valid votes | | 141,247 | | |
| Registered electors | | 256,391 | | ▲49.19 |
| INC hold | | Swing | ▲0.78 | |

=== Assembly Election 1985 ===
1985 Maharashtra Legislative Assembly election : Parvati
| Party | Candidate | Votes | % | ±% |
|---|---|---|---|---|
| INC | Sharad Ranpise | 42,836 | 46.56% | New |
| BJP | Vishwas Krishnarao Gangurde | 34,517 | 37.52% | ▲4.68 |
| Independent | Ramesh Anandrao Bagwe | 7,727 | 8.40% | New |
| Independent | Budhiwant Shalubai Tukaram | 4,281 | 4.65% | New |
| Independent | Subhash Waghmare | 2,496 | 2.71% | New |
| Margin of victory | | 8,319 | 9.04% | ▼10.12 |
| Turnout | | 92,945 | 54.08% | ▲5.72 |
| Total valid votes | | 92,007 | | |
| Registered electors | | 171,854 | | ▲17.94 |
| INC gain from INC(I) | | Swing | ▼5.44 | |

=== Assembly Election 1980 ===
1980 Maharashtra Legislative Assembly election : Parvati
| Party | Candidate | Votes | % | ±% |
|---|---|---|---|---|
| INC(I) | Vasant Chavan | 36,233 | 52.00% | ▲31.28 |
| BJP | Gangurde Vishwas Krishnarao | 22,880 | 32.84% | New |
| INC(U) | Matre Shankarrao Gopal | 8,509 | 12.21% | New |
| RPI | Bhosale B. D. | 1,072 | 1.54% | New |
| Independent | Dhasal Namdeo Laxman | 600 | 0.86% | New |
| Margin of victory | | 13,353 | 19.16% | ▼2.78 |
| Turnout | | 70,629 | 48.47% | ▼13.37 |
| Total valid votes | | 69,676 | | |
| Registered electors | | 145,707 | | ▲10.16 |
| INC(I) gain from JP | | Swing | ▲3.19 | |

=== Assembly Election 1978 ===
1978 Maharashtra Legislative Assembly election : Parvati
| Party | Candidate | Votes | % | ±% |
|---|---|---|---|---|
| JP | Subhash Sarvagod | 39,504 | 48.82% | New |
| INC | Matre Shankarrao Gopalrao | 21,748 | 26.87% | New |
| INC(I) | Budhiwant Shalu Tukaram | 16,771 | 20.72% | New |
| Independent | Memjade Tikamdas Daduram | 1,231 | 1.52% | New |
| Independent | Jadhav Hiraman Baburao | 1,159 | 1.43% | New |
| Margin of victory | | 17,756 | 21.94% | |
| Turnout | | 82,264 | 62.20% | |
| Total valid votes | | 80,925 | | |
| Registered electors | | 132,263 | | |
| JP win (new seat) | | | | |
