= Suryakant Lonkar =

Indian politician

Suryakant Lonkar is an Indian politician and member of the Shiv Sena. Lonkar is a one term member of the Maharashtra Legislative Assembly in 1995 from the Pune Cantonment Assembly Constituency in Pune.
