= Siddharth Shirole =

Indian politician

- सिद्धार्थ अनिल शिरोळे

Member of the Maharashtra Legislative Assembly
- Incumbent
- Assumed office 2019
- Preceded by: Vijay Kale
- Constituency: Shivajinagar

Personal details
- Born: 4 February 1979 (age 47) Pune, Maharashtra, India
- Party: Bharatiya Janata Party
- Parent: Anil Shirole (father)
- Education: B.E. in Mechanical Engineering
- Alma mater: University of Pune
- Website: siddharthshirole.com

Siddharth Anil Shirole (Marathi: सिद्धार्थ अनिल शिरोळे) (born 4 February 1979) is an Indian politician of the Bharatiya Janata Party (BJP) and Member of Maharashtra Legislative Assembly representing the Shivajinagar Vidhansabha Constituency from Pune.

Shirole is also the Ex - Councillor for Ward 14 (Deccan Gymkhana – Model Colony) of the Pune Municipal Corporation. Shirole is also the Ex - Director of Pune Mahanagar Parivahan Mahamandal Limited and National Finance Head of the Bharatiya Janata Yuva Morcha.

He is the son of Anil Shirole, a former member of the Lok Sabha from Pune. He belongs to a well-known Shirole Patil Family of Shivajinagar Pune.

Professionally, Shirole heads the Parichay Group of Hotels and Restaurants, which owns the multi-award-winning restaurant Shabree (शबरी), Hotel Parichay, Shavaree Restaurant and Zaika Spice IceCream.

Shirole is the author of the self-help book Today is my Favourite Day: Unleashing the Power of Optimism, published by Wisdom Tree.

Shirole represented India in the prestigious International Visitor Leadership Program U.S. Department of State's premier professional exchange program for International Opinion Leaders, whose notable alumni from India include ex-president Pratibha Patil, ex-president Kocheril Raman Narayanan, former prime minister Atal Bihari Vajpayee, former prime minister Indira Gandhi and former prime minister Morarji Desai.

== Political career ==
Siddharth Shirole is a member of the Rashtriya Swayamsevak Sangh (RSS), since his childhood a far-right Hindu nationalist paramilitary volunteer organisation.
