= Bhavani Peth =

Coordinates: 18°30′33.78″N 73°52′11.42″E

Bhavani Peth is a Marathi language name for a locality in the Indian state of Maharashtra. This includes the cities of Pune, Solapur, Madhavnagar, Karad and Ahmednagar. The term Bhavani was derived from the Hindu goddess Bhavani to whom there is temple in Tuljapur in the Solapur district.

Bhawani Peth is an important center of the timber trade and has a thriving hardware and steel market. The market caters to the civil and allied industry.
