= Sunil Kamble =

Indian politician

Sunil Dhyandev Kamble is an Indian politician from Maharashtra. He was elected to the Maharashtra Legislative Assembly from Pune Cantonment in the 2019 Maharashtra Legislative Assembly election as a member of Bharatiya Janata Party.

== Early life and education ==
Kamble is from Kasba, Pune District, Maharashtra. He is the son of Dhyandev Namdev Kamble. He is the younger brother of two time BJP Minister Dilip Kamble. He comes from a poor background and entered politics at a young age. He completed Class 8 at Camp Education High School, Pune in 1983 and later discontinued his education.

== Career ==
Kamble started his political life with ABVP. In 1992, Kamble started as corporator in the Pune Municipal Corporation. He was also elected as Standing Committee Chairperson of PMC in March 2019.

He played a key role for the BJP in campaigning at booth level in the elections to the Balurghat Assembly constituency in West Bengal 2021 elections. He became an MLA winning the 2019 Maharashtra Legislative Assembly election. He is a member of the legislative committee on Schedule Castes in the Maharashtra Legislature.

== Controversies ==
Kamble allegedly slapped a police man on duty at a public event at Sassoon General Hospital and faced criticism after the video went viral.
