= Shreedhar Mahadev Joshi =

Indian politician

Member of Parliament, Lok Sabha
- In office 1967–1971
- Preceded by: Shankarrao More
- Succeeded by: Mohan Dharia
- Constituency: Poona

4th Leader of the Opposition in the Bombay Legislative Assembly
- In office 1958–1959
- Preceded by: Tulsidas Jadhav
- Succeeded by: Udhavrao Patil

Member of Bombay Legislative Assembly
- In office 1957–1962
- Constituency: Shukrawar Peth

General Secretary of Samyukta Maharashtra Samiti
- In office 1959 - 1960
- Preceded by: position established
- Succeeded by: position abolished

Personal details
- Born: 12 November 1904 Junnar, Bombay Presidency, British India
- Died: 1 April 1989 (aged 84)
- Party: Janata Party
- Other political affiliations: • Praja Socialist Party • Samyukta Socialist Party
- Education: Fergusson College, Pune
- Occupation: Social activist, politician, parliamentarian
- Known for: • Indian Independence Movement • Samyukta Maharashtra Samiti

Shreedhar Mahadev Joshi, also known as S.M. Joshi (12 November 1904 – 1 April 1989), was an Indian independence activist, a Socialist, a Member of Parliament, and leader of Samyukta Maharashtra Samiti.

== Biography ==
Born 12 November 1904, in Junnar, Pune, Shreedhar Mahadev Joshi is considered a distinguished personality among the stalwarts of the socialist movement in India. A well-known social worker, he served as the Chairman of the Praja Socialist Party (PSP) and the Samyukta Socialist Party (SSP) and was a founder member of the Janata Party.

Joshi excelled in his academic years both at school and college. A student of New Modern English School, Pune, he displayed outstanding oratory skill in contests while at the Fergusson College and won innumerable prizes. His literary excellence was well reflected in his regular article contributions. He was motivated to move into politics after participating in the Gujarat festivals and Tilak processions. He entered the Indian independence movement in 1924 while still studying at college.

Joshi was jailed for one year in 1930 for his involvement in the Civil Disobedience Movement. Following his release, he was again put behind bars for another two years for a speech he made on "Roy's Day". This earned him a lot of acclaim from the people of India.

His notable contributions to the socialist movement include the formation of the Congress Socialist Party in 1934, the Rashtra Seva Dal, and his role in the revolutionary campaign launched by Jayaprakash Narayan.

In his political career, he worked as the secretary of the Maharashtra Youth Conference and the Mass-Contact Committee. He played a key role in the success of the (Congress Convention). He was a member of the All-India Congress Socialist Party. His other notable social work includes his participation in the Samyukta Maharashtra Samiti's drive for a unilingual Marathi speaking Maharashtra state, setting up worker unions, and working for the cause of the Dalits in Maharashtra. He became a State Assembly member in 1957, and secured a Lok Sabha seat in 1967.

Joshi died in 1989.
