= Mohan Joshi (politician) =

Indian politician

Member of Maharashtra Legislative Council
- In office 2008–2014

Personal details
- Born: 3 December 1956 (age 69) Pune, Maharashtra, India
- Party: Indian National Congress
- Occupation: Politician
- Website: http://mohanjoshi.org

Mohan Joshi is an Indian politician from Pune, Maharashtra. He represents the Indian National Congress in various organizational and constitutional capacities, including as head of the Maharashtra Pradesh Congress Committee as state general secretary since 2009. He belongs to the Pune Constituency. He is the president of the Maharashtra branch of Harijan Sevak Sangh.

== Career ==
In 1972, Joshi was president of the Pune Youth Congress. In 1987, he was president of the Maharashta Youth Congress. Under his leadership from 1997 to 2004, the Indian National Congress party won all the elections for the Parliament, the State Assembly, and the Pune Municipal Corporation. He served as the working president of Pune General Workers Union.

In the 1999 Lok Sabha elections, Joshi was a Congress candidate for the Parliament elections from Pune constituency. Joshi received 212,000 votes and secured the second position. In 2002, in response to the alleged religious chauvinism of the Vishwa Hindu Parishad (VHP), Joshi stormed into a VHP meeting and blackened the face of VHP leader Parvin Togadia.

Joshi served as General Secretary of Maharashtra Pradesh Congress Committee beginning in 2005 and as a member of the Executive Committee of the State Unit beginning in 2009. From 2008 to 2010, he was a member of the Estimate Committee in the Maharashtra Legislative Council.

In 2010, Joshi was nominated as a public representative of Pune University's senate. Joshi was selected as a member of the Commonwealth Parliamentarian Association study-tour of Europe and the UK in 2011. Starting in 2011, he was the chairman of the Assurance Committee in the Maharashtra Legislative Council.

For the 2019 Lok Sabha elections, Joshi was the Congress candidate for Pune constituency. In 2014, Bharatiya Janata Party won the Pune Lok Sabha constituency.

Joshi is president of the Maharashtra branch of Harijan Sevak Sangh.
