= Madhuri Misal =

Indian politician

Minister of state Government of Maharashtra
- Incumbent
- Assumed office 15 December 2024
- Chief Minister: Devendra Fadnavis
- Department: Urban Development; Transport; Social Justice; Medical Education; Minority Development & Aukaf

Member of the Maharashtra Legislative Assembly
- Incumbent
- Assumed office 2009
- Preceded by: Ramesh Bagve
- Constituency: Parvati

President of Bharatiya Janata Party – Pune City
- In office 19 August 2017 – 29 January 2020
- President: Raosaheb Danve; Chandrakant Patil
- Preceded by: Yogesh Gogawale
- Succeeded by: Jagdish Mulik

Personal details
- Born: 19 April 1964 (age 61); Pune, Maharashtra, India
- Political party: Bharatiya Janata Party
- Spouse: Late Satishsheth Misal
- Profession: Politician

Madhuri Deshpande- Misal is a leader of Bharatiya Janata Party and a member of the Maharashtra Legislative Assembly elected from Parvati (Vidhan Sabha constituency) in Pune city. She is the minister of state in Third Fadnavis ministry.

== Positions held ==
- 2009: Elected to Maharashtra Legislative Assembly.
- 2014: Re-elected to Maharashtra Legislative Assembly.
- 2019: Re-elected to Maharashtra Legislative Assembly.
- 2024: Re-elected to Maharashtra Legislative Assembly.
