= Indian Congress (Socialist) =

- Abbreviation: IC(S)
- Leader: Sharad Pawar
- Founder: Sharad Pawar; Priya Ranjan Dasmunsi; A.K. Antony; Sarat Chandra Sinha
- Founded: 1978
- Dissolved: 1986
- Split from: Indian National Congress
- Youth wing: Indian Youth Congress (Socialist)
- Colours: Green

Election symbol
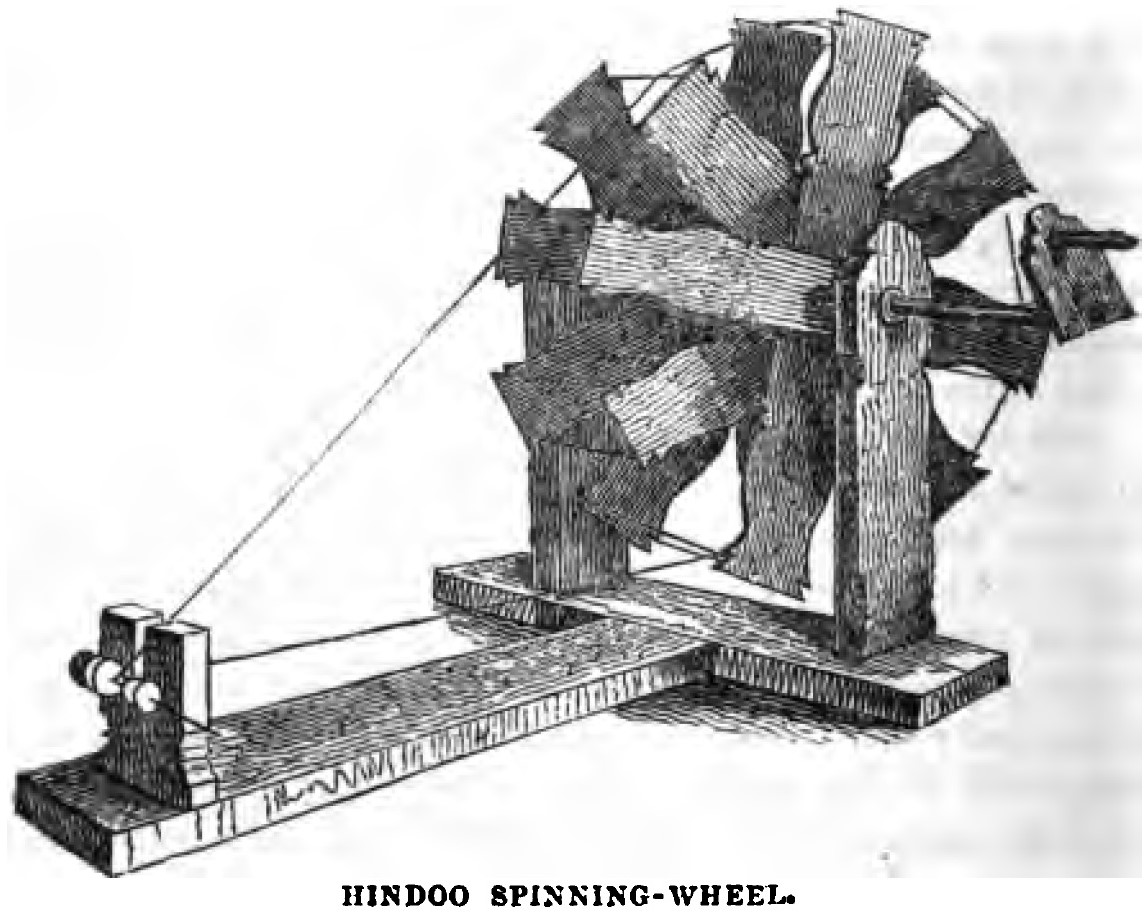

Indian Congress (Socialist) (IC(S)) also known as Congress (Secular) was a political party in India between 1978 and 1986.

The party was formed through a split in the Indian National Congress. Initially the party was known as the Indian National Congress (Urs) and was led by D. Devraj Urs.

It broke away from the parent party in 1978 following Indira Gandhi's drubbing in the 1977 General Elections. Urs took with him many legislators from Karnataka, Kerala, Maharashtra and Goa, including future Union Ministers and Chief Ministers A.K. Antony, Sharad Pawar, Dev Kant Baruah, Priyaranjan Das Munshi, Sarat Chandra Sinha, K. P. Unnikrishnan and Mohammad Yunus Saleem.

When Sharad Pawar took over the party presidency in October 1981, the name of the party was changed to Indian Congress (Socialist).

Pawar became the youngest chief minister of Maharashtra by toppling the Vasantdada Patil-led Congress government in 1978. He led a group of 40 MLAs to split from the parent party and formed the government with Janata Party's support.

In 1980, after Indira Gandhi swept the Lok Sabha polls, Pawar's state government was dismissed. In the Maharashtra elections in 1980, his party could only win 47 seats, with Indian National Congress (Indira) winning 186.

Again in 1985, Pawar's party the Indian National Congress (Socialist) won only 54 seats and he became the Leader of Opposition in Maharashtra. With the split and the decline of the Janata Party nationally, Pawar soon realised that he can't get back to power in Maharashtra on his own. Pawar merged his party back into the Congress in 1986.

One section led by Sarat Chandra Sinha broke away from IC(S) in 1984 and formed a separate party known as Indian Congress (Socialist) – Sarat Chandra Sinha. This faction merged with Sharad Pawar's Nationalist Congress Party in 1999.

However, in Kerala, the residual faction of Indian Congress (Socialist), Congress (Secular) led by Kadannappalli Ramachandran still exists and is a part of the Left Democratic Front. In 2007, Democratic Indira Congress (Left) merged with this party.

== See also ==
- Indian National Congress breakaway parties
