= Mohan Dharia =

Indian politician (1925–2013)

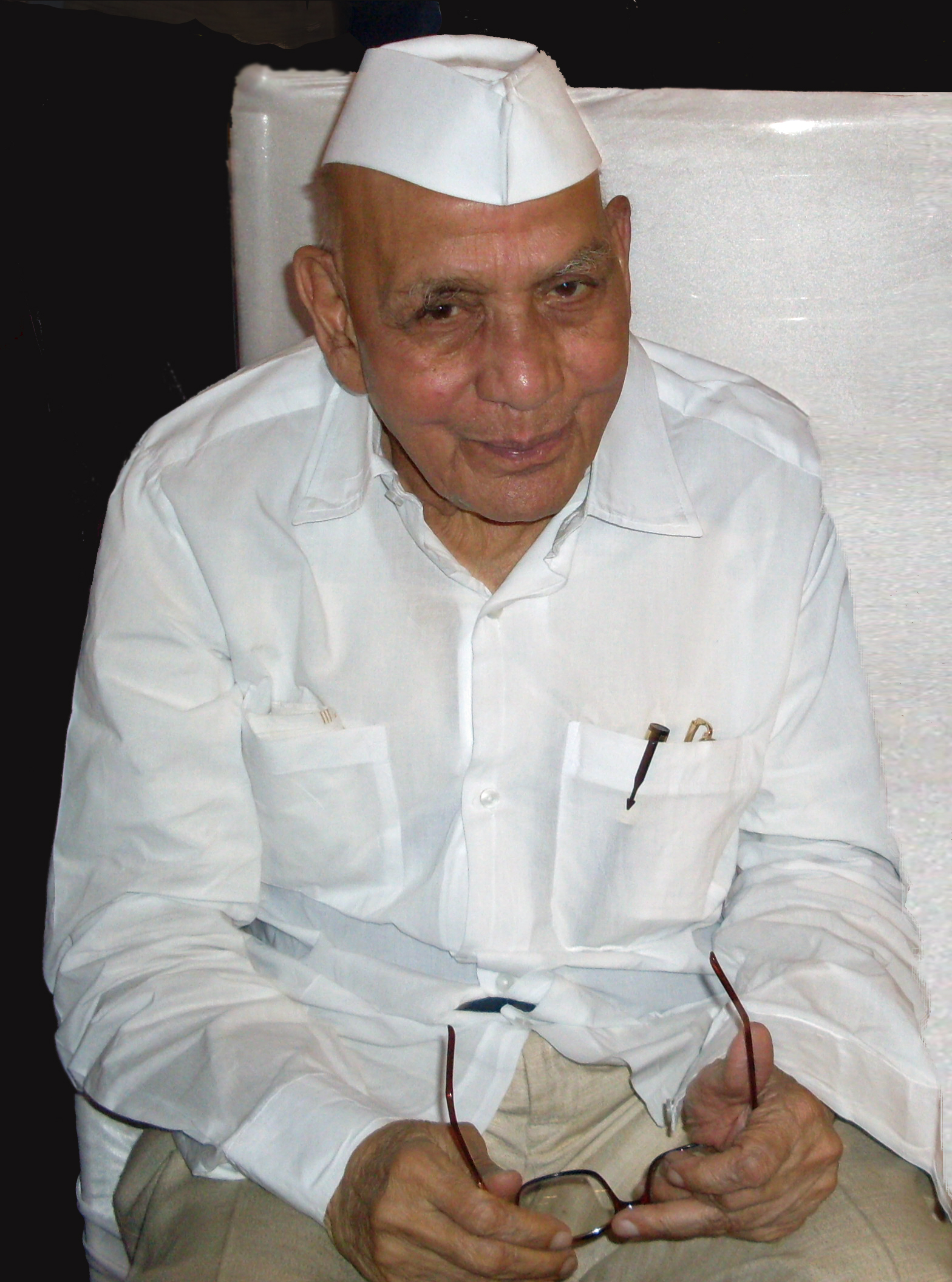
- Born: 14 February 1925; Raigad district
- Died: 14 October 2013 (aged 88)
- Education: Savitribai Phule Pune University
- Occupations: Politician, lawyer
- Political party: Janata Party
- Awards: Padma Vibhushan (social work)

Mohan Dharia (14 February 1925 – 14 October 2013) was a Union minister, a lawyer and social worker. During his last days he stayed in Pune. Dharia was an environmentalist and ran a non-government organisation Vanarai. He was elected to the Lok Sabha twice from Pune Lok Sabha constituency, first in 1971 as an Indian National Congress (INC) member and became a Minister of State, and later in 1977 as a Bharatiya Lok Dal member, and joined the Morarji Desai Ministry as Union Minister of Commerce. Prior to it, he remained member of the Rajya Sabha twice from INC, first 1964–1970 and then 1970- 1971

He was awarded the Padma Vibhushan, India's second highest civilian honour in 2005, by Government of India for his contribution in social work.

== Early life and education ==
Born in at village Nate, then Kolaba district, present Mahad Taluka, Raigad district, to Manikchand Dharia, he did his schooling from Konkan Education Society, Mahad. Later he joined Fergusson College Pune to become a surgeon, but abandoned his studies to join the independence movement in 1942. Thereafter he studied law at ILS Law College, Pune University.

== Career ==
He started his career as an advocate at the Bombay High Court and in time started his political career.

He was previously associated with the Praja Socialist Party and also participated in National Struggle. He was general secretary of Maharashtra Pradesh Congress Committee 1962—67 and member of All India Congress Committee 1962—75. A highlight of Dharia's political career was his staunch opposition to the Thirty-eighth Amendment of the Constitution of India, introduced in 1975 by Prime Minister Indira Gandhi. He called it 'a surrender of parliamentary democracy to the coming dictatorship'. His opposition to the imposition of a state of emergency in June 1975 led to his detention by the government with other dissenting leaders such as Morarji Desai, Chandra Shekhar and others. He quit Congress after the emergency after 1975.

He held various positions in Public life:

- Member, Pune Municipal Corporation, 1957–60,
- Chairman of its Transport Undertaking, 1957–58;
- Elected to Rajya Sabha in 1964 and 1970;
- Member, Fifth Lok Sabha, 1971—77 from Pune
- Minister of State for Planning, May 1971 to October, 1974,
- Minister of State for Works & Housing, October 1974 to March 1975;
- Member, Sixth Lok Sabha, 1977–1980 from Pune.
- Minister of Commerce, Civil Supplies and Co-operation 1977–1979;
- Deputy Chairman of the Planning Commission, Dec 90 - June 91

== Awards ==
- Padma Vibhushan : Highest Padma Award,
- D.Lit,
- Indira Priyadarshini Vrikshamitra Awards,
- Yashwantrao Chavan Award for Excellence,
- Rajiv Gandhi Paryavaran Ratna Award,
- Pune’s Pride Award,
- Jeevan Gaurav Award,
- Development Jewel Award,
- 26th Indira Gandhi Award for National Integration
