= Vadgaon Sheri Assembly constituency =

Constituency of the Maharashtra legislative assembly in India

Coordinates: 18.549°N 73.920°E

Vadgaon Sheri
- Constituency No. 208 for the Maharashtra Legislative Assembly

Constituency details
- Country: India
- Region: Western India
- State: Maharashtra
- District: Pune
- Lok Sabha constituency: Pune
- Established: 2008
- Total electors: 503,973
- Reservation: None

Member of Legislative Assembly
- 15th Maharashtra Legislative Assembly
- Incumbent Bapusaheb Pathare
- Party: NCP-SP
- Alliance: MVA
- Elected year: 2024

Vadgaon Sheri Assembly constituency is one of the 288 Vidhan Sabha (legislative assembly) constituencies of Maharashtra state, western India. This constituency is located in Pune district and is one of the six assembly constituencies that make up Pune Lok Sabha constituency.

The constituency was most recently won by Bapusaheb Pathare of the Nationalist Congress Party – Sharadchandra Pawar in the 2024 Maharashtra Legislative Assembly election defeating Sunil Tingre of the Nationalist Congress Party by about 4710 votes.

== Geographical scope ==
The constituency comprises wards number 8 to 15, 64 to 68 and 125 to 129 of Pune Municipal Corporation (PMC) as well as the Kalas revenue circle of Haveli taluka excluding areas transferred to PMC.

== Members of the Legislative Assembly ==
Year	Member	Party
Until 2008: Constituency did not exist
2009	Bapusaheb Pathare	Nationalist Congress Party
2014	Jagdish Mulik	Bharatiya Janata Party
2019	Sunil Tingre	Nationalist Congress Party
2024	Bapusaheb Pathare	Nationalist Congress Party (SP)

== Election results ==
=== Assembly Election 2024 ===
2024 Maharashtra Legislative Assembly election : Vadgaon Sheri
Party	Candidate	Votes	%	±%
NCP-SP	Bapusaheb Tukaram Pathare	133,689	47.79%	New
NCP	Sunil Vijay Tingre	128,979	46.11%	New
VBA	Vivek Krishna Londhe	5,488	1.96%	▼2.89
NOTA	None of the Above	4,259	1.52%	▲0.38
BSP	Chalwadi Hulgesh Mariappa	3,762	1.34%	▲0.57
BSP (A)	Chandrakant Parmeshwar Sawant	3,198	1.14%	New
Margin of victory		4,710	1.68%	▼0.65
Turnout		284,009	56.35%	▲9.37
Total valid votes		279,750		
Registered electors		503,973		▲10.28
NCP-SP gain from NCP		Swing	▲1.75	

=== Assembly Election 2019 ===
2019 Maharashtra Legislative Assembly election : Vadgaon Sheri
Party	Candidate	Votes	%	±%
NCP	Sunil Vijay Tingre	97,708	46.04%	▲25.78
BJP	Jagdish Tukaram Mulik	92,752	43.70%	▲13.23
VBA	Pravin Bapurao Gaikwad	10,300	4.85%	New
AIMIM	Daniyal Landge	7,702	3.63%	New
NOTA	None of the Above	2,418	1.14%	▲0.34
BSP	Bengale Rajesh Dattatray	1,653	0.78%	▼0.65
Margin of victory		4,956	2.34%	▼0.09
Turnout		214,705	46.98%	▼6.60
Total valid votes		212,224		
Registered electors		456,998		▲11.52
NCP gain from BJP		Swing	▲15.57	

=== Assembly Election 2014 ===
2014 Maharashtra Legislative Assembly election : Vadgaon Sheri
Party	Candidate	Votes	%	±%
BJP	Jagdish Tukaram Mulik	66,908	30.47%	New
SS	Sunil Vijay Tingre	61,583	28.05%	▲4.81
NCP	Bapusaheb Tukaram Pathare	44,480	20.26%	▼22.75
MNS	Narayan Mohan Galande	18,830	8.58%	▼8.49
INC	Adv.Chandrakant Chhajed	12,497	5.69%	New
RPI(A)	Dr.Dhende Siddharth Yashwant	9,247	4.21%	▼2.58
BSP	Kusale Dilip Namdev	3,131	1.43%	▼6.42
NOTA	None of the Above	1,754	0.80%	New
Margin of victory		5,325	2.43%	▼17.35
Turnout		221,371	54.02%	▲7.80
Total valid votes		219,557		
Registered electors		409,772		▲12.00
BJP gain from NCP		Swing	▼12.54	

=== Assembly Election 2009 ===
2009 Maharashtra Legislative Assembly election : Vadgaon Sheri
Party	Candidate	Votes	%	±%
NCP	Bapusaheb Tukaram Pathare	72,034	43.01%	New
SS	Ajay Jaywant Bhosale	38,918	23.24%	New
MNS	Rajendra Shankarrao Endal	28,579	17.06%	New
BSP	Chalwadi Hulgesh Mariappa	13,140	7.85%	New
RPI(A)	Sayyad Afsar Ibrahim	11,381	6.80%	New
Margin of victory		33,116	19.77%	
Turnout		167,518	45.79%	
Total valid votes		167,483		
Registered electors		365,861		
NCP win (new seat)				
