= Vitthal Tupe =

Indian politician

Vitthal Baburao Tupe (10 September 1940, Hadapsar, Maharashtra – 2 July 2004, Hadapsar) was an Indian politician. He was senior member of Nationalist Congress Party. He is a three time member of the Maharashtra Legislative Assembly from the Pune Cantonment constituency in Pune as member of the Janata Party.

== Background ==
Tupe is from Pune. His son Chetan Vitthal Tupe is the MLA from Hadapsar Assembly constituency.

== Career ==
In 1998, Tupe won the Pune Lok Sabha constituency on an Indian National Congress ticket but joined the Nationalist Congress Party after Sharad Pawar left the Indian National Congress. He first became an MLA winning from Pune Cantonment Assembly constituency on Janata Party ticket in the 1978 Maharashtra Legislative Assembly election. He retained it in the 1980 election and won for a third time in the 1985 Maharashtra Legislative Assembly election.

== Positions held ==
- Member of the Maharashtra Legislative Assembly from the Pune Cantonment constituency (thrice)
- Senior member of Nationalist Congress Party
