= People's Guardian =

People's Guardian Party
- Leader: Arun Bhatia
- Founded: January 2009
- Headquarters: Blue Hills, Nagar Road, Pune, Maharashtra - 411001
- Ideology: Honest, Corruption and fear free India

Website
- www.arunbhatiaelect.com/know/know-the-party.html

The People's Guardian Party (Hindi: लोक रक्षक) of India was founded in January 2009, by Arun Bhatia. Bhatia is its Chairman and President.

== Background ==
In 2004 Bhatia contested the parliamentary election as an independent candidate from Pune.

== Ideology ==
The ideology of the People's Guardian Party is to:

- Give every honest Indian freedom from fear
- Eliminate mafia rule
- Drive change from Pune

The party is registered with the Election Commission of India, New Delhi.

== Support ==
In the 2004 election Bhatia received ~60,000 votes. He supported Durga Shakti Nagpal's action against the sand mafia.

== See also ==
- List of political parties in India
