= Anna Joshi =

Indian politician

- Born: 3 April 1935; Varangaon
- Died: 10 December 2014 (aged 79); Pune

Laxman Sonopant Joshi (3 April 1935 – December 2014), popularly known as Anna Joshi, was a former member of the Lok Sabha. He was a member of Bharatiya Janata Party and later Nationalist Congress Party. Born in 1935, Anna Joshi studied MSc at Pune University. He was detained under MISA in the emergency for 18 months. He was elected to the Lok Sabha in 1991 from Pune. Earlier he was elected to the Maharashtra Vidhan Sabha in 1980 and 1985 from Shivaji Nagar seat in Pune. BJP did not nominate him to contest 1996 Lok Sabha election from Pune. He quit BJP in 1998, and joined NCP later. He contested Vidhan Sabha election of 2009 from Kothrud as NCP candidate but came a distant fourth.

== Early life ==
Joshi was born on 3 April 1935 in Varangoan, Jalgaon. He pursued MSc degree from Pune University. He was a small-scale industrialist by profession.

== Political career ==
=== Positions held ===
- Corporator, Municipal Corporation, Pune (1968–79)
- Deputy Mayor, Municipal Corporation, Pune (1968–79)
- President, B.J.P., Pune (1978–79)
- Member, Maharashtra Legislative Assembly (1980-82 & 1986–90)
- Member, Estimates Committee, Maharashtra Legislative Assembly (1980–91)
- Member, Public Undertakings Committee, Maharashtra Legislative Assembly (1982–85)
- Member, Petitions Committee, Maharashtra Legislative Assembly (1982–85)
- Member, Business Advisory Committee, Maharashtra Legislative Assembly (1986–90)
- Deputy Speaker, Maharashtra Legislative Assembly (1990–91)
- Elected to Lok Sabha (Tenth) (1990–91)
