= List of people from Pune =

List page

This is a categorized list of notable people who were born or have lived in Pune, India. Only people who are sufficiently notable to have individual entries on Wikipedia have been included in the list.

== Authors and writers ==
- Acharya Pralhad Keshav Atre (1898–1969) – Marathi writer, poet and educationist
- Subhash Awchat (1950-) – artist and author
- Sarojini Babar (1920–2008) – writer and politician
- Malati Bedekar (née Baltai Khare) (1905–2001) – writer in Marathi
- Ninad Bedekar (1949–2015) – writer, historian and orator
- Vasudeo Sitaram Bendrey (1894–1986) – historian who discovered first image of Chhatrapati Shivaji Maharaj, wrote first full-proof biography of Chhatrapati Sambhaji Maharaj and wrote on whole Shivshahi period
- Vishnushastri Krushnashastri Chiplunkar (1850–1882) – essayist; editor of Nibandha Mala, a Marathi journal; educator; mentor to Bal Gangadhar Tilak and Gopal Ganesh Agarkar; founder of the influential Chitrashala press
- Purushottam Laxman Deshpande (Pu La Deshpande) (1919–2000) – Marathi author, actor, music composer, singer
- Muktabai Dixit (1901–1980) – writer in Marathi
- Rohit Gore (1977-) – author in Hindi
- Chintaman Vinayak Joshi (1892–1963) – Marathi humorist and a researcher in Pali literature
- Shakuntala Karandikar (1931–2018) – biographer and philanthropist
- Dinkar G. Kelkar (1896–1990) – writer, art collector and historian
- Narasimha Chintaman Kelkar (1872–1947) – writer, journalist, nationalist leader; served on the Viceroy's Executive Council (1924–29)
- Krushnaji Prabhakar Khadilkar (1872–1948) – editor of Kesari and Navakal
- Vinayak Kulkarni (1950-) – Marathi writer and researcher of literature produced by Marathi saints
- Shripad Mahadev Mate (1886–1957) – writer and teacher
- Shaiju Mathew (1980-) – author, film maker
- Shirish Pai (1929–2017) – writer in Marathi and English
- Shanta Shelke (1922–2002) – Marathi poet
- Mangesh Tendulkar (1934–2017) – cartoonist

== Artists and entertainers ==
=== Movie, television and theater personalities ===
- Bharati Achrekar (1957-) – actress and singer
- Mohan Agashe (1947-) – theater/film actor and Sangeet Natak Akademi awardee
- Radhika Apte (1985-) – film and stage actress
- Sanskruti Balgude (1992-) – actress in Marathi movies and television
- Mukta Barve (1979-) – film, television and theater actress, and producer
- Pooja Chopra (1986-) – Femina Miss India, 2009
- Annalisa Cochrane (1996–) – actress
- Kashmira Irani (1986-) – television and theatre actress
- Shivangi Joshi (1998-) – television actress and model
- Shivangi Khedkar (1995-) – television actress and model
- Dipika Kakar (1986-) – actress
- Gauahar Khan (1983-) – model and actress
- Chandrakant Kulkarni (1963-) – director, script writer and actor associated with Marathi theatre and film
- Mrunal Kulkarni née Dev/Deo (1971-) – actress
- Roopesh Kumar (1946–1995) – film actor
- Shriram Lagoo (1927–2019) – film and stage actor
- Prajakta Mali (1989-) – television/film/theatre actor, anchor, producer and Bharatnatyam dancer
- Spike Milligan (1919–2000) – Irish comedian who spent his childhood in the city
- Anjali Mukhi (1986-) – television and theatre actress
- Sai Paranjpye (1938-) – broadcaster and film director
- Nilkanth Krishnaji Phule (Nilu Phule) (1931–2009) – film and theatre actor
- Sharad Talwalkar (1918–2001) – film, TV and theatre comedy actor
- Damoo Dhotre (1902–1973) – circus performer and animal trainer with Ringling Bros. and Barnum & Bailey Circus

=== Musicians and dancers ===
- Sanjeev Abhyankar (1969-) – Hindustani classical music vocalist of the Mewati Gharana
- Mandar Agashe (1969-) – music director
- Vineet Alurkar (1949-) – musician and singer-songwriter
- Prabha Atre (1932-) – Hindustani classical music vocalist of the Kirana gharana and a Padma Shri awardee
- Neela Bhagwat (1942-) – Hindustani classical music musician of the Gwalior Gharana
- Vishnu Narayan Bhatkhande (1860–1936) – eminent maestro of Hindustani classical music; alumnus of Deccan College
- Bhaskar Chandavarkar (1936–2009) – musician
- Rahul Deshpande (1979-) – Hindustani classical music vocalist; grandson of Pandit Dr. Vasantrao Deshpande
- Ajay Gogawale (1976-) – one half of the music director-composer sibling duo Ajay–Atul
- Atul Gogawale (1974-) – one half of the music director-composer sibling duo Ajay–Atul
- Pandit Bhimsen Joshi (1922–2011) – Hindustani classical vocalist and recipient of the Bharat Ratna
- Ritviz (1996–) – singer-songwriter, electronic musician, and record producer
- Altaf Tadavi (1999–) – singer-songwriter, rapper, music producer

== Defence services personnel ==
- General Manoj Mukund Naravane, PVSM, AVSM, SM, VSM, ADC (1960-) – retired Army general who served as the 27th Chief of the Army; temporary Chairman of the Chiefs of Staff Committee; alumnus of the Jnana Prabodhini Prashala and the National Defence Academy

== Educationalists and researchers ==
- Shivrampant Damle (1900–1977) – educationalist
- Sonopant (Shankar Vaman) Dandekar (1896–1969) – philosopher and educationalist
- Rohini Godbole (1952–2024) – particle physicist
- Jyoti Gogte (1956-) – academician
- P. A. Inamdar (1945-) – educationalist
- B. K. S. Iyengar (1918–2014) – yoga teacher; developed internationally popular Iyengar Yoga
- Anandibai Joshi (1865–1887) – first Indian and Hindu woman to get a medical degree from a foreign university
- Narendra Karmarkar (1957-) – mathematician and creator of Karmarkar's algorithm
- Irawati Karve (1905–1970) – anthropologist
- Raghunath Mashelkar (1943-) – chemical engineer, scientist
- Tarabai Modak (1892–1973) – advocate of Montessori education; recipient of the Padmabhushan
- Jayant Narlikar (1938-) – astrophysicist
- Satish Pande – radiologist, conservationist and wildlife researcher
- Datto Vaman Potdar (1890–1979) – historian
- Vishwanath Kashinath Rajwade (1863–1926) – historian; founder of Pune-based Bharat Itihas Sanshodhak Mandal
- Kamal Ranadive (1917–2001) – biologist specialising in cancer research
- Nalini Sengupta – principal of Vidya Valley School and mountaineer
- Vasant Honavar – computer scientist who is also involved in bioinformatics
- Pandurang Vasudeo Sukhatme (1911–1997) – statistician, recipient of the Padmabhushan

== Engineers and architects ==
- Prof. Christopher Charles Benninger (1942-) – born in the US and settled in Pune in 1976; one of India's highly decorated architects; his award-winning projects include the Mahindra United World College of India, the Samundra Institute of Maritime Studies, the Suzlon One Earth world headquarters, the National Ceremonial Plaza at Thimphu, Bhutan and India House (his residence and design studio at Balewadi, Pune); co-founded the Center for Development Studies and Activities along with his wife Aneeta Gokhale-Benninger in Pune in 1976

== Industrialists and business leaders ==
=== Industrialists ===
- Anu Aga (1942-) – businesswoman and social worker
- Chandrashekhar Agashe (1888–1956) – founder of Brihan Maharashtra Sugar Syndicate
- Rahul Bajaj (1938–2022) – industrialist
- Rajiv Bajaj (1966-) – businessman and managing director of Bajaj Auto
- Ajaypal Singh Banga (1960-) – USA-based corporate executive and political advisor to former US President Barack Obama and Padma Shri awardeeAnant Gadgil (Dajikaka Gadgil) (1915–2014) – founder of P. N. Gadgil Jewellers
- Babashaeb Neelkanth Kalyani (Baba Kalyani) (1949-) – industrialist
- Laxmanrao Kashinath Kirloskar (1869–1956) – founder of Kirloskar Group
- Shantanurao Laxmanrao Kirloskar (1903–1994) – industrialist
- Ivan Menezes (1959-) – business executive, CEO of Diageo; brother of Victor Menezes
- Victor Menezes (1947-) – banker, former chairman and CEO of Citibank; brother of Ivan Menezes
- Adar C. Poonawalla (1981-) – businessman, CEO of the Serum Institute of India; son of Cyrus S. Poonawalla
- Cyrus S. Poonawalla (1945-) – businessman, chairman of Poonawalla Group, which includes the Serum Institute of India; father of Adar Poonawalla

=== Business leaders ===
- Shashishekhar Balkrishna Pandit (Ravi Pandit) (1950-) – chairman and group CEO of KPIT Technologies; founder trustee of Janwani (an NGO focused on improvements in urban India) and the Pune International Centre recipient of Maharashtra Corporate Excellence (MAXELL) Awards for "Excellence in Entrepreneurship" and for his contribution to the economic and industrial development of Pune, and the Samata Award
- Natasha Poonawalla (1981-) – businesswoman, chairwoman of the Villoo Poonawalla Foundation
- Laxman Narasimhan – CEO of Starbucks from October 2022; former chief commercial officer of PepsiCo; former CEO of Reckitt
- Sheetal Agashe (1977–) – managing director of Brihans Natural Products and former actress

== Political figures ==
=== Personages during the Maratha empire ===
- Peshwa Bajirao – minister in the court of Shahu of Satara, responsible for shifting the administrative capital to Pune
- Jijabai (1598–1674) – wife of Shahajiraje Bhosale Jagirdar of Pune, Shahajiraje; mother of Chhatrapati Shivaji Maharaj who raised him during 1640s in Pune

=== Freedom fighters ===
- Gopal Ganesh Agarkar (1856–1895) – journalist, educator and social reformer
- Senapati Bapat (born Pandurang Mahadev Bapat) (1880–1967) – a figure in the Indian independence movement
- Gopal Krishna Gokhale (1866–1915) – early Nationalist leader on the moderate wing of the Congress party; founder of the Servants of India Society
- Lokhitwadi (Gopal Hari Deshmukh) (1823–1892) – social reformer
- Mahatma Jyotiba Phule – prominent leader of modern India responsible for women's educational rights and eradicating caste discrimination
- Bal Gangadhar Tilak (1856–1920) – Indian nationalist leader

=== Politicians post-independence ===
- Vitthalrao Gadgil – leader of Indian National Congress
- Sharad Pawar – ex-CM, Maharashtra
- Anil Shirole – ex-member of Parliament from Pune; former Big Leader of Pune and BJP
- Siddharth Shirole – member of Legislative Assembly from Shivajinagar Assembly Constituency Pune, Present Leader of Shivajinagar, Pune and BJP
- Bal Thackeray (1926–2012) – founder of the Shiv Sena; born in Pune
- Sunil Deodhar – co-incharge of BJP Andhra Pradesh

== Social reformers ==
- R. G. Bhandarkar (1837–1925) – Orientalist and social reformer
- Mahatma Jyotiba Phule (1827–1890) – social reformer, prominently known for modern educational ideas & eradicating caste discrimination
- Pandita Ramabai Dongre (1858–1922) – social reformer
- Mahadev Govind Ranade (1842–1901) – judge and social reformer
- Savitribai Phule (1831–1897) – social reformer; responsible for women's educational rights after a great revolt against society

== Spiritual leaders ==
- Meher Baba (1894–1969) – spiritual leader
- Aga Khan II (1830–1885) – imam of the Ismailis
- Jangali Maharaj (1804–1890) – Great Sadhguru
- Rajneesh (Osho) (1931–1990)

== Sportspersons ==
- Pankaj Advani (born 1985) – billiards and snooker world champion
- Ashutosh Agashe (born 1972) – cricket player and businessman
- Dnyaneshwar Agashe (1942–2009) – cricketer and cricket administrator
- Chinmay Gupte (born 1972) – former cricketer
- Eban Hyams (born 1981) – Indian-born Australian professional basketball player
- Kedar Jadhav (born 1985) – cricketer who plays for India in international cricket
- Hrishikesh Kanitkar (born 1974) – former cricketer
- Nikhil Kanetkar (born 1979) – badminton player and Olympian
- Shubhangi Kulkarni (born 1959) – cricketer
- Dhanraj Pillay (born 1968) – hockey player
- Maninder Singh (born 1965) – cricketer
- Lisa Sthalekar (born 1979) – former Indian-born Australian international cricketer
