= List of people from Maharashtra =

This is a list of notable people from Maharashtra, India

== Art ==
- Mangesh Tendulkar
- Pramod Kamble
- S. D. Phadnis

=== Actors ===
- Ajinkya Deo
- Amol Palekar
- Ankush Chaudhari
- Ashok Saraf
- Atul Kulkarni
- Bharat Jadhav
- Chandrakant Mandare
- Dada Kondke
- Dilip Prabhavalkar
- Kashinath Ghanekar
- Kuldeep Pawar
- Laxmikant Berde
- Mahesh Kothare
- Makarand Anaspure
- Makarand Deshpande
- Master Vinayak
- Milind Gunaji
- Milind Soman
- Mohan Gokhale
- Nana Patekar
- Nilu Phule
- Nishikant Kamat
- Prabhakar Panshikar
- Prashant Damle
- Riteish Deshmukh
- Sharad Talwalkar
- Sachin Khedekar
- Sachin Pilgaonkar
- Sadashiv Amrapurkar
- Sandeep Kulkarni
- Sanjay Narvekar
- Sayaji Shinde
- Shahu Modak
- Shivaji Satam
- Shreyas Talpade
- Siddharth Jadhav
- Sudhir Joshi
- Subodh Bhave
- Vikram Gokhale

=== Actresses ===
- Alka Kubal
- Aditi Govitrikar
- Ashwini Bhave
- Bhavana
- Durga Khote
- Genelia D'Souza
- Isha Koppikar
- Jayshree Gadkar
- Lalita Pawar
- Leela Chitnis
- Kavita Lad
- Kimi Katkar
- Madhuri Dixit
- Mamta Kulkarni
- Meena Kumari
- Mugdha Godse
- Namrata Shirodkar
- Shenaz Treasurywala
- Nishigandha Wad
- Nivedita Saraf
- Nutan
- Padmini Kolhapure
- Pallavi Joshi
- Radhika Apte
- Rajshree
- Rohini Hattangadi
- Shraddha Kapoor
- Shilpa Shirodkar
- Smita Patil
- Sheetal Agashe
- Shobhna Samarth
- Sonali Bendre
- Sonali Kulkarni
- Sai Tamhankar
- Supriya Pathak
- Sushama Shiromanee
- Usha Chavan
- Urmila Matondkar
- Vandana Gupte

=== Directors ===
- Madhur Bhandarkar
- Mahesh Manjrekar
- Ashutosh Gowariker
- Amole Gupte
- Sachin Pilgaonkar
- Nagraj Manjule
- Satish Rajwade
- Ravi Jadhav
- Ayan Mukerji
- Sanjay Leela Bhansali
- Zoya Akhtar

=== Visual artists ===
- Maria Marshall

== Award winners from Maharashtra ==
- Bharat Ratna
  - B. R. Ambedkar
  - Vinoba Bhave
  - Nanaji Deshmukh
  - Pandurang Vaman Kane
  - Dhondo Keshav Karve
  - Lata Mangeshkar
  - Sachin Tendulkar
- Padma Vibhushan
  - B. G. Kher, 1954
- Padma Bhushan
  - Homi J. Bhabha, Science & Engineering, 1954
- Padma Shri
  - Asha Devi Aryanayakam, Public Affairs, 1954

== Business and industry ==
- Abasaheb Garware, Garware group
- Azim Premji, Wipro
- Baba Kalyani (Babasaheb Nilaknthrao Kalyani), Bharat Forge
- Baburao Govindrao Shirke, Shirke Group of Companies
- Baburaoji Parkhe, Parkhe group
- Bhavarlal Jain, Jain Irrigation
- Chandrasekhar Bhaskar Bhave, SEBI Chairman
- Chandrashekhar Agashe, BMSS
- Dajikaka Gadgil, PNG Jewellers
- Deepak Ghaisas, Iflex
- Dilip Dandekar, Camlin
- Ganesh Gadgil, PNG Jewellers
- Jyoti Gogte, Golden Nugget Engineering & Electroplast
- Kalpana Saroj, Kamani Tubes
- Kiran Karnik, former president of NASSCOM, 2007–08
- Panditrao Agashe, BMSS
- Purshottam Narayan Gadgil, PNG Jewellers
- Rahul Bajaj, Bajaj Group
- Rajendra Pawar, NIIT
- Raosaheb Gogte, Gogte Group
- S L Kirloskar (Shantanurao), Kirloskar group
- Subhash Runwal, Runwal Group Chairman
- Vikram Pandit, Citigroup CEO
- Vivek Ranadive, TIBCO
- Walchand Hirachand, Walchand Group of Industries

=== Street vendor ===
- Dolly Chaiwala

== Defence forces ==
- General Arun S. Vaidya
- Namdeo Jadav
- Yeshwant Ghadge
- Manoj Mukund Narwane
- Manoj Pande
- Vivek Ram Chaudhari

== Gallantry honors ==
=== Param Vir Chakra ===
- Lieutenant Colonel Ardeshir Burzorji Tarapore, Poona Horse (posthumous)
- Major Rama Raghoba Rane Bombay Engineers
- Major Ramaswamy Parameshwaran

== Journalism ==
- Nanasaheb Parulekar, founder editor of Sakal

== Literature ==
- Vasant Purushottam Kale
- Ranjit Desai
- N. S. Inamdar
- Shivaji Sawant
- Acharya Atre
- B. S. Mardhekar
- G. A. Kulkarni
- G. D. Madgulkar
- Gangadhar Gadgil
- Kusumagraj
- Mangesh Padgaonkar
- P. L. Deshpande
- Vasant Abaji Dahake
- Vasant Kanetkar
- Vijay Tendulkar
- Vilas Sarang
- Vinda Karandikar
- Shakuntala Karandikar
- Baba Kadam, novelist
- Babasaheb Purandare
- Vishnu Sakharam Khandekar
- Shirish Kanekar
- Suhas Shirvalkar
- Nagnath Lalujirao Kottapalle
- Sadashiv Ranade
- Gangadhar Pathak
- Dinkar G. Kelkar
- Irawati Karve

== Medicine ==
- B. K. Misra, neurosurgeon

== Music ==
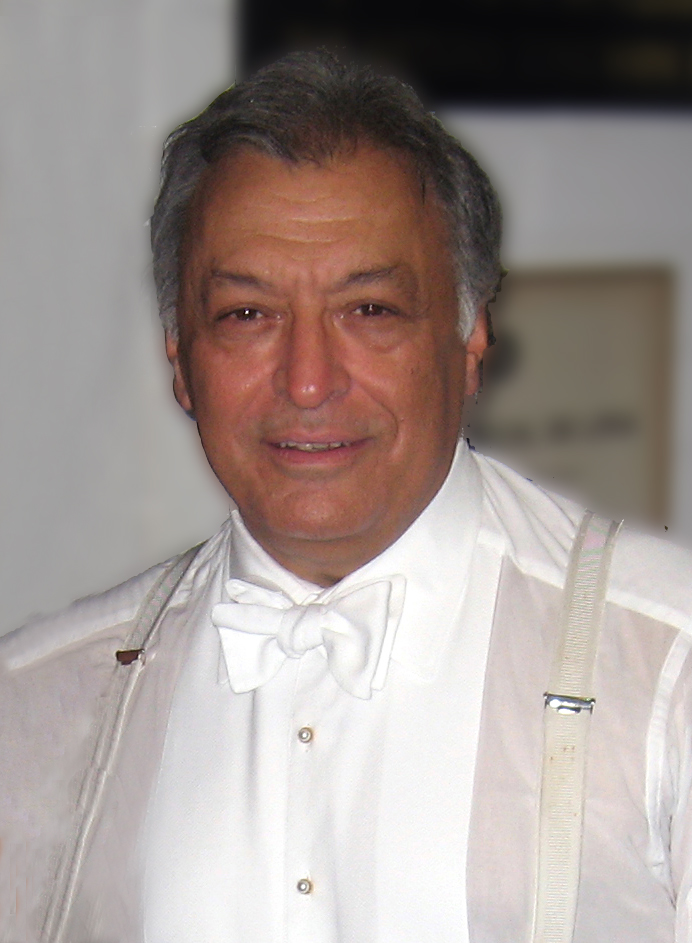
Zubin Mehta

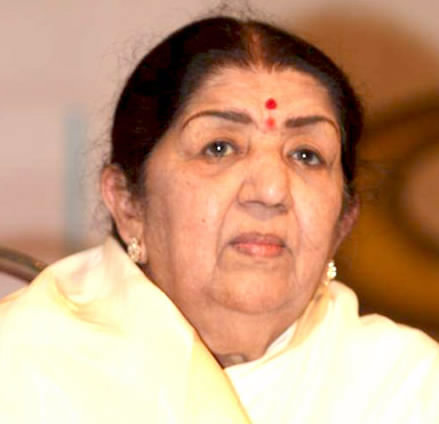
Lata Mangeshkar

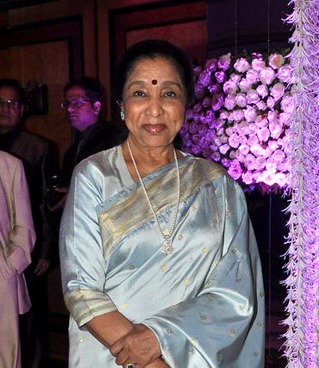
Asha Bhosle

- Mandar Agashe, music director
- Vineet Alurkar, musician
- Aarya Ambekar, singer
- Kishori Amonkar, singer
- Ajay Atul, music director
- Prabha Atre, singer
- Swapnil Bandodkar, singer
- Ashwini Bhide, singer
- Shamika Bhide, singer
- Asha Bhosle, singer
- Vasantrao Deshpande, classical singer of Patiala Gharana
- Bal Gandharva, theatre
- Sawai Gandharva, singer
- Avdhoot Gupte, singer
- Bhimsen Joshi, classical singer
- Suman Kalyanpur, singer
- Kesarbai Kerkar, singer
- Shrinivas Khale, music director
- Shalmali Kholgade, singer
- Mogubai Kurdikar, singer
- Prathamesh Laghate, singer
- Deenanath Mangeshkar, theatre
- Lata Mangeshkar, singer
- Usha Mangeshkar, singer
- Ketaki Mategaonkar, singer
- Zubin Mehta, conductor
- Vaishali Mhade, singer
- Anuradha Paudwal, singer
- Ashutosh Phatak, music director
- Rohit Raut, singer
- Vaishali Samant, singer
- Sadhana Sargam, singer
- Abhijeet Sawant, singer
- Bela Shende, singer
- Adarsh Shinde, singer
- Rahul Vaidya, singer
- Mugdha Vaishampayan, singer
- Suresh Wadkar, singer

== Hip Hop ==
- Divine, rapper
- Naezy, rapper

== Police ==
- Vijay Salaskar
- Ashok Kamte
- Tukaram Omble
- Vishwas Nangare Patil
- Hemant Karkare

== Politics ==
=== Rajya Sabha members ===
- List of Rajya Sabha members from Maharashtra

=== Chief ministers ===
- List of chief ministers of Maharashtra

=== Others ===
- Ajit Pawar
- Anant Gadgil
- Anil Shirole
- Babasaheb Ambedkar
- Bal Thackeray
- Balasaheb Desai
- Balasaheb Vikhe Patil
- Chhagan Bhujbal
- Dhulappa Bhaurao Navale
- Ganpatrao Deshmukh
- Gopal Ganesh Agarkar
- Gopal Krishna Gokhale
- Gopinath Munde
- Hari Shivaram Rajguru
- Haribhau Jawale
- Keshavrao Jedhe
- Manikrao Thakare
- Manohar Joshi
- Narayan Rane
- Patangrao Kadam
- Prakash Ambedkar
- Pramod Mahajan
- Prithviraj Chavan
- R R Patil
- Raj Thackeray
- Ram Shinde
- Ramdas Athawale
- Rani Lakshmibai
- Senapati Bapat
- Shankarrao Chavan
- Sharad Pawar
- Shivraj Patil
- Shrikant Jichkar
- Shripad Amrit Dange
- Siddharth Shirole
- Sudhakarrao Naik
- Sunil Deshmukh
- Sushilkumar Shinde
- Tatya Tope
- Uddhav Thackeray
- Vasantrao Naik
- Vasantdada Patil
- Vilasrao Deshmukh
- Vinayak Damodar Savarkar
- Yashwantrao Chavan

== Religion ==
- Samarth Ramdas
- Tukaram
- Namdev
- Dnyaneshwar
- Eknath
- Sai Baba of Shirdi
- Gajanan Maharaj
- Chokhamela
- Gora Kumbhar
- Muktabai
- Bahinabai
- Janabai
- Kanhopatra
- Gondavalekar Maharaj
- Swami Samarth
- Jangali Maharaj
- Rufus Pereira

== Rulers ==
- Krishna of Devagiri
- Ramachandra of Devagiri
- Shivaji
- Sambhaji
- Madhavrao I
- Ahilyabai Holkar
- Shahu II of Kolhapur
- Mahadaji Shinde
- Malhar Rao Holkar
- Yashwantrao Holkar
- Bajirao I
- Khemirao Sarnaik

== Scientists ==
- Vijay P. Bhatkar
- Anil Kakodkar
- Madhav Gadgil
- Raghunath Mashelkar
- Jayant Narlikar
- Shekhar C. Mande
- Chandrashekhar Sonwane
- Chandrashekhar Khare
- Narendra Karmarkar
- Shreeram Shankar Abhyankar
- Shrinivas Kulkarni
- Abhay Ashtekar
- Aravind Joshi
- Subhash Khot
- Ashok Gadgil
- Anandi Gopal Joshi
- T. P. Lahane

== Social activists ==
- Baba Amte
- Pandurang Shastri Athavale
- Sindhutai Sapkal
- B. R. Ambedkar
- Jyotirao Phule
- Ashok Row Kavi
- Dhondo Keshav Karve
- Banoo Jehangir Coyaji
- Kisan Mehta
- Harish Iyer
- Manibhai Desai
- Anna Hazare
- Medha Patkar
- Savitribai Phule
- Abhay and Rani Bang
- Vinoba Bhave
- Bhaurao Patil
- Bal Gangadhar Tilak
- Vinayak Damodar Savarkar
- Annabhau Sathe
- Prakash Amte
- Hari Narke
- Shivrampant Damle

== Sports ==
=== Badminton ===
- Nandu Natekar
- Aparna Popat

=== Chess ===
- Pravin Thipsay
- Vidit Gujrathi

=== Contract bridge ===
- Jaggy Shivdasani
- Orlando Campos
- Ramesh Gokhale
- Keshav Samant, popularly known as Anand Samant

=== Cricket ===
- Abhishek Nayar
- Ajinkya Rahane
- Ajit Agarkar
- Ashutosh Agashe
- Baloo Gupte
- Chandrakant Pandit
- Chandrakant Patankar
- Chandrasekhar Gadkari
- Chandu Borde
- Dattaram Hindlekar
- Dattu Phadkar
- Dilip Vengsarkar
- Dnyaneshwar Agashe
- Hemant Kanitkar
- Hemu Adhikari
- Hrishikesh Kanitkar
- Kedar Jadhav
- Khandu Rangnekar
- Kiran More
- Manohar Hardikar
- Nilesh Kulkarni
- Paras Mhambrey
- Phiroze Palia
- Polly Umrigar
- Pravin Amre
- Rahul Dravid
- Ramnath Parkar
- Ravi Shastri
- Rohan Gavaskar
- Rohit Sharma
- Sachin Tendulkar
- Sairaj Bahutule
- Salil Ankola
- Sameer Dighe
- Sandeep Patil
- Sanjay Bangar
- Sanjay Manjrekar
- Shardul Thakur
- Shreyas Iyer
- Subhash Gupte
- Sunil Gavaskar
- Umesh Yadav
- Vijay Hazare
- Vijay Manjrekar
- Vijay Merchant
- Vinod Kambli
- Vinoo Mankad
- Wasim Jaffer
- Zaheer Khan

=== Hockey ===
- Dhanraj Pillay
- Viren Rasquinha
- Hiranna Nimal

=== Shooting ===
- Anjali Bhagwat
- Tejaswini Sawant

=== Other sports ===
- Ashish Mane - Mountaineerng
- Gaurav Natekar - Tennis
- K. D. Jadhav - Wrestling, won first Olympic individual medal for India
- Murlikant Petkar - Swimming, India's first Paralympic Gold Medalist
- Dilip Gavit, Para athlete

== Criminals and gangsters ==
- Arun Gawli
- Dawood Ibrahim, criminal and drug dealer
- Chhota Rajan
- Manya Surve
- Maya Dolas
- Tiger Memon
- Yakub Memon

== See also ==
- List of Marathi people
- Lists of Indian people
- List of people from Nagpur
