= Dhotre =

Dhotre is a surname. People with the surname include:

- Sanjay Shamrao Dhotre
- Anup Dhotre
- Bandu Dhotre
- Shashikant Dhotre
- Damoo Dhotre

== See also ==
- Dhotre Bk
