= Gadgil =

Gadgil is a Chitpavan brahmin surname from Maharashtra, India.

== Notable persons ==
- Anant Gadgil (born 1956), Indian politician
- Anant "Dajikaka" Gadgil (1915–2014), Indian jeweller, founder of P. N. Gadgil Jewellers & Company in Pune
- Arvinn Gadgil (born 1980), Norwegian Socialist Left Party politician of Indian descent
- Ashok Gadgil (born 1950), Director of the Energy and Environmental Technologies Division at Lawrence Berkeley National Laboratory
- Dhananjay Ramchandra Gadgil (1901–1971), Indian economist, institution builder and the vice chairman of the Planning Commission of India
- Ganesh Gadgil (1815–1890), Indian jeweller, founder of P. N. Gadgil Jewellers & Sons in Sangli
- Gangadhar Gopal Gadgil (1923–2008), Marathi writer from Maharashtra, India
- Madhav Gadgil (1942–2026), Indian ecologist, academic, writer, columnist and the founder of the Centre for Ecological Sciences
- Monica Gadgil, contestant on Fame Gurukul, an Indian prime-time show on Sony Entertainment Television (India)
- Narhar Vishnu Gadgil (1896–1966), Indian freedom fighter and politician from Maharashtra, India
- Purshottam Narayan Gadgil (1874–1954), Indian jeweller, namesake of P. N. Gadgil Jewellers
- Sulochana Gadgil (1944–2025), Indian meteorologist at the Centre for Atmospheric and Oceanic Sciences (CAOS) in Bangalore, India
- Vitthalrao Gadgil (1928–2001), politician in cabinet of Indian National Congress run government

== See also ==
- Gadgil Committee (WGEEP), an environmental research commission appointed by the Ministry of Environment and Forests of India, chaired by Madhav Gadgil
- Gadgil formula, named after Dhananjay Ramchandra Gadgil, a social scientist and the first critic of Indian planning
- Gagil, Yap
- Gagal, Iran
