= Damle =

Damle is a surname. Notable people with the surname include:

- Prashant Damle (born 1961), Indian actor and comedian
- Satyawan Damle (born 1951), Indian professor
- Shivrampant Damle (1900–1977), Indian educationist
- Sitaram Keshav Damle, Marathi journalist
- Vishnupant Govind Damle (1892–1945), Indian production designer, cinematographer, film director, and sound engineer
