= Narhar Vishnu Gadgil =

Indian politician (1896–1966)

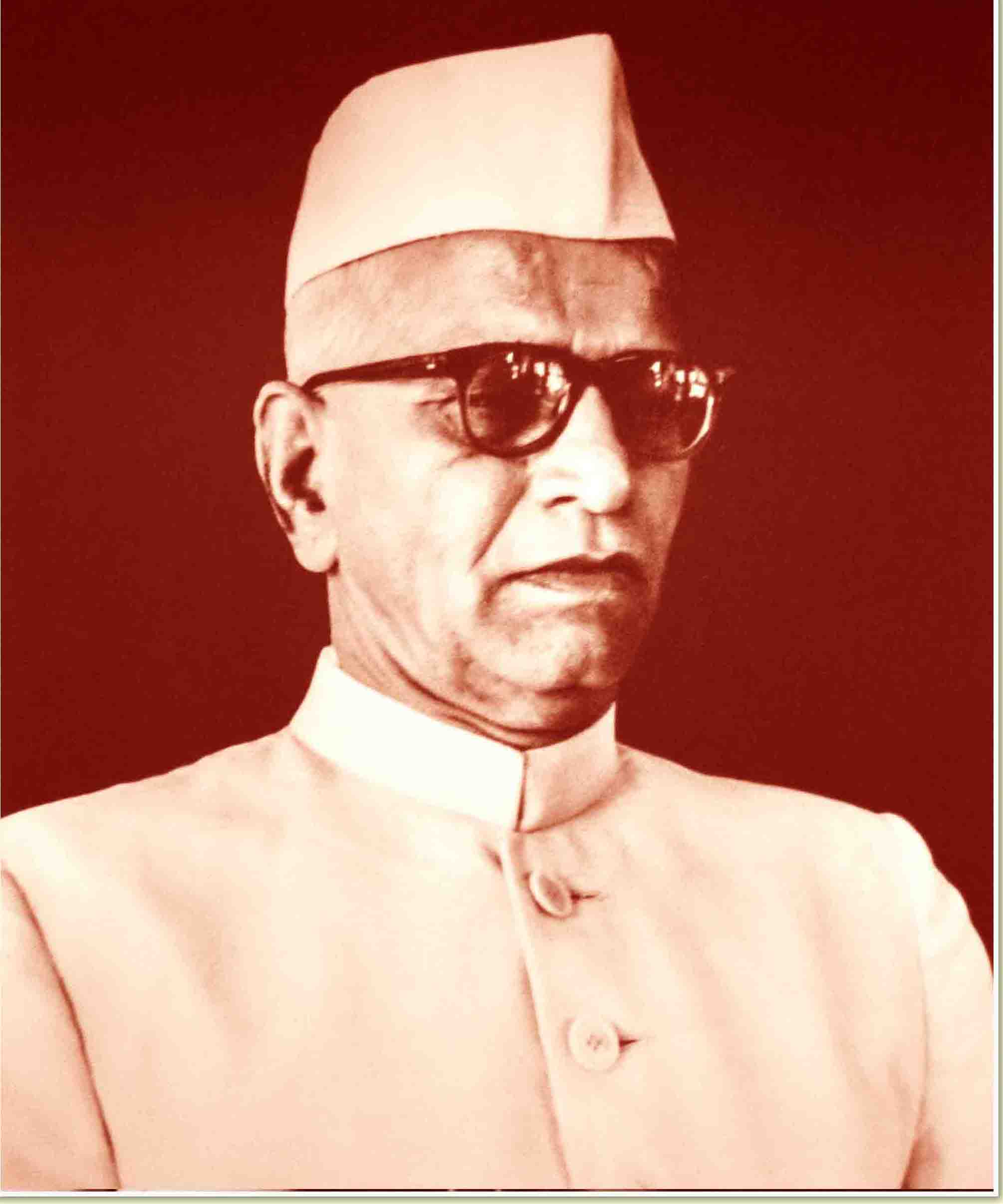
- Gadgil in 1958

3rd Governor of Punjab
- In office 15 September 1958 – 1 October 1962
- Chief Minister: Partap Singh Kairon
- Preceded by: Chandeshwar Prasad Narayan Singh
- Succeeded by: Pattom Thanu Pillai

1st Minister of Power
- In office 15 August 1947 – 12 December 1950
- Prime Minister: Jawaharlal Nehru
- Preceded by: Office Established
- Succeeded by: Gulzarilal Nanda

Personal details
- Born: 10 January 1896 Malhargarh, British India (Now in Madhya Pradesh, India)
- Died: 12 January 1966 (aged 70)
- Party: Indian National Congress
- Education: Fergusson College

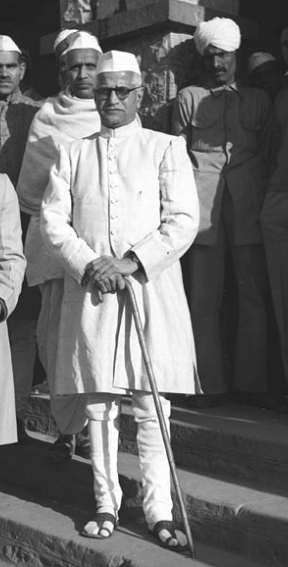
N.V. Gadgil at Bharatpur Railway Station for the inauguration of the Matsya States Union (March 1948)

Narhar Vishnu Gadgil (10 January 1896 – 12 January 1966) was an Indian freedom fighter and politician who served as 1st Minister of Power from 1947 to 1950 and 3rd Governor of Punjab from 1958 to 1962. He was also a writer. He wrote in both Marathi and English. His son Vitthalrao Gadgil represented Congress later as minister and ideologue. His grandson Anant Gadgil also went on to become a politician.

Gadgil graduated from Fergusson College in Pune in 1918, and obtained a degree in Law in 1920.

== Activities before India's independence ==
Gadgil was born a member of the Gadgil gharana of Velneshwar-Wai.

In India's pre-independence days, freedom fighters Lokmanya Bal Gangadhar Tilak, Mahatma Gandhi, Jawaharlal Nehru, and Vallabhbhai Patel influenced Gadgil. Spiritual leaders Swami Ramkrishna Paramhans and Swami Vivekanand also made a deep impression on him. He joined the Indian National Congress in 1920, immediately after obtaining his law degree and started his active participation in the national freedom movement. He suffered imprisonment from the ruling British government eight times for the participation.

In India's pre-independence days, Gadgil served as the secretary of Poona District Congress Committee (1921–25), the president of Maharashtra Pradesh Congress Committee (1937–45), and the whip and secretary of the Congress Legislative Party (1945–47). He was elected to the central Legislative Assembly in 1934.

Gadgil was a pioneer in social reform movements in Maharashtra in the 1930s.

During the Civil Disobedience Movement, which began in 1930, Gadgil was listed as a leader for the Maharashtra Civil Disobedience Committee and the Pune War Council.

== Service after India's independence ==
Between 1947 and 1952 Gadgil served as a minister in the first central cabinet of independent India. He held the portfolios of Public Works, and Mines and Power. In his first year in the central Cabinet, he initiated the project of building a military-caliber road from Pathankot to Srinagar via Jammu in Kashmir as a part of India's activities in the 1947 Indo-Pakistan War. As a cabinet minister, he also initiated the important development projects pertaining to Bhakra, Koyna, and Hirakund dams. He was a member of the Congress Working Committee from 1952 to 1955.

Gadgil served as the governor of Punjab from 1958 to 1962 and as the vice-chancellor of Poona University 1964 onwards until his death less than two years later.

He was associated with several public associations and institutions, including Sarvajanik Sabha, Pune; Young Men's Association, Pune; Maharashtra Youth League, Bombay; Pune Central Cooperative Bank; and Pune Municipality.

His son Vitthalrao Gadgil was a veteran congressman and MP from Pune Lok Sabha constituency, and his grandson Anant Gadgil is currently spokesman for Maharashtra Pradesh Congress Committee.

== Honour ==
The Indian Post & Telegraph Department issued a commemorative postage stamp in Gadgil's honour in 1985.

== Authorship ==
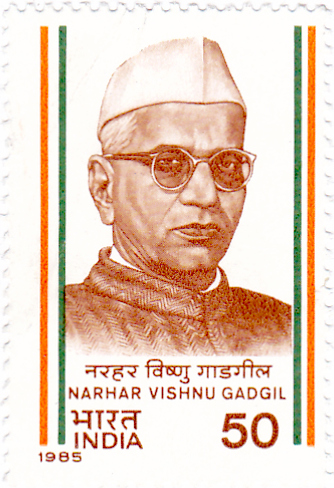
Narhar Vishnu Gadgil 1985 stamp of India

Gadgil wrote several books and articles on politics, economics, law, and history. He was elected president of Marathi Sahitya Sammelan in 1962 held at Satara.

The following are some of Gadgil's books:

- Pathik (autobiography)
- Rajya Shastra Wichar
- Shubha Shastra
- Waktrutwa Shastra
- Gyanbache Arthashastra
- Government from Inside
- Shikhancha Itihaas (history of Sikhs)
