= Gokhale =

Indian surname

Gokhale is a Marathi Hindu Brahmin surname found in the Chitpavan (Konkanastha) community native to the coastal region of the western state of Maharashtra, India.

== People ==
- Anupama Gokhale, Indian chess player
- Ashok B. Gokhale, Indian diplomat
- Bapu Gokhale, Maratha general
- Chandrakant Gokhale, Marathi actor and father of Vikram Gokhale
- Gopal Krishna Gokhale, leader in the Indian independence movement
- H. R. Gokhale, Indian politician, former minister of law and justice, father-in-law of writer Namita Gokhale
- Hemant Gokhale, former judge of the Supreme Court of India, and former Chief Justice of the Allahabad High Court
- Kamlabai Gokhale, one of India's first actresses, mother of actor Chandrakant Gokhale
- Mohan Gokhale, actor
- Girish Gokhale, senior IAS officer, former chief of Mumbai municipal corporation
- Namita Gokhale, writer, daughter-in-law of politician H. R. Gokhale
- Padmavati Gokhale Shaligram, Hindustani vocalist and music educator
- Poorva Gokhale, leading marathi television actress
- Rajesh Sudhir Gokhale, chemical biologist
- Ramesh Gokhale, Indian bridge player
- Sakhi Gokhale, Marathi television actress and daughter of Mohan Gokhale and Shubhangi Gokhale
- Sayali Gokhale, Indian badminton player
- Shanta Gokhale, writer, translator, journalist, theater critic and mother of actress Renuka Shahane
- Shubhangi Gokhale, actress and wife of actor Mohan Gokhale
- Vidyadhar Gokhale, Marathi playwright, editor, and politician
- Vijay Keshav Gokhale, diplomat, 32nd Foreign Secretary of India
- Vikram Gokhale, actor
- Vishnubawa Brahmachari (Vishnu Bhikaji Gokhale), Sannyasi, Vedic revivalist, Social reformer
- Nikita Gokhale, Law and commerce (finance) Student at UNSW Sydney.

== Other uses ==
- Gokhale Institute of Politics and Economics
