= Trilegal =

Law firm based in India

- No. of offices: 9
- No. of lawyers: 1300+
- Major practice areas: Full Service Law Firm
- Date founded: 2000
- Company type: Partnership
- Website: www.trilegal.com

Trilegal is a law firm based in India. The firm advises a diverse set of clients, including Fortune 500 companies, global investment funds, major Indian conglomerates, domestic and international banks, technology and media giants, family offices, and high-net-worth individuals. With more than 165+ Partners operating under a distinctive lockstep model, Trilegal is the largest equity partnership in the country. It has over 1300 lawyers across 9 offices in Delhi, Gurugram, Mumbai, Pune, Chennai, and Bengaluru. The firm provides services in areas of real estate, infrastructure, energy, technology and IT enabled services, M&A, capital markets, private equity, capital funds, corporate and commercial disputes, intellectual property, competition law and banking.

In the year 2007, Trilegal along with Linklaters advised Vodafone in relation to its multi-billion dollar ($11.1 billion) acquisition of a 67% stake in Hutchison Essar Ltd., a leading telecom company in India which is still one of the biggest M&A transactions in India.

In early 2008, Trilegal announced that it had entered into a non-financial relationship with Allen & Overy entailing client referrals, training, consultation and joint marketing in India, which was terminated in 2012.

In September 2024, Trilegal and S&R Associates advised PN Gadgil Jewellers on its initial public offering (IPO) valued at INR 11 billion (approximately USD 132.8 million).
