= Bapu Gokhale =

Peshwa general

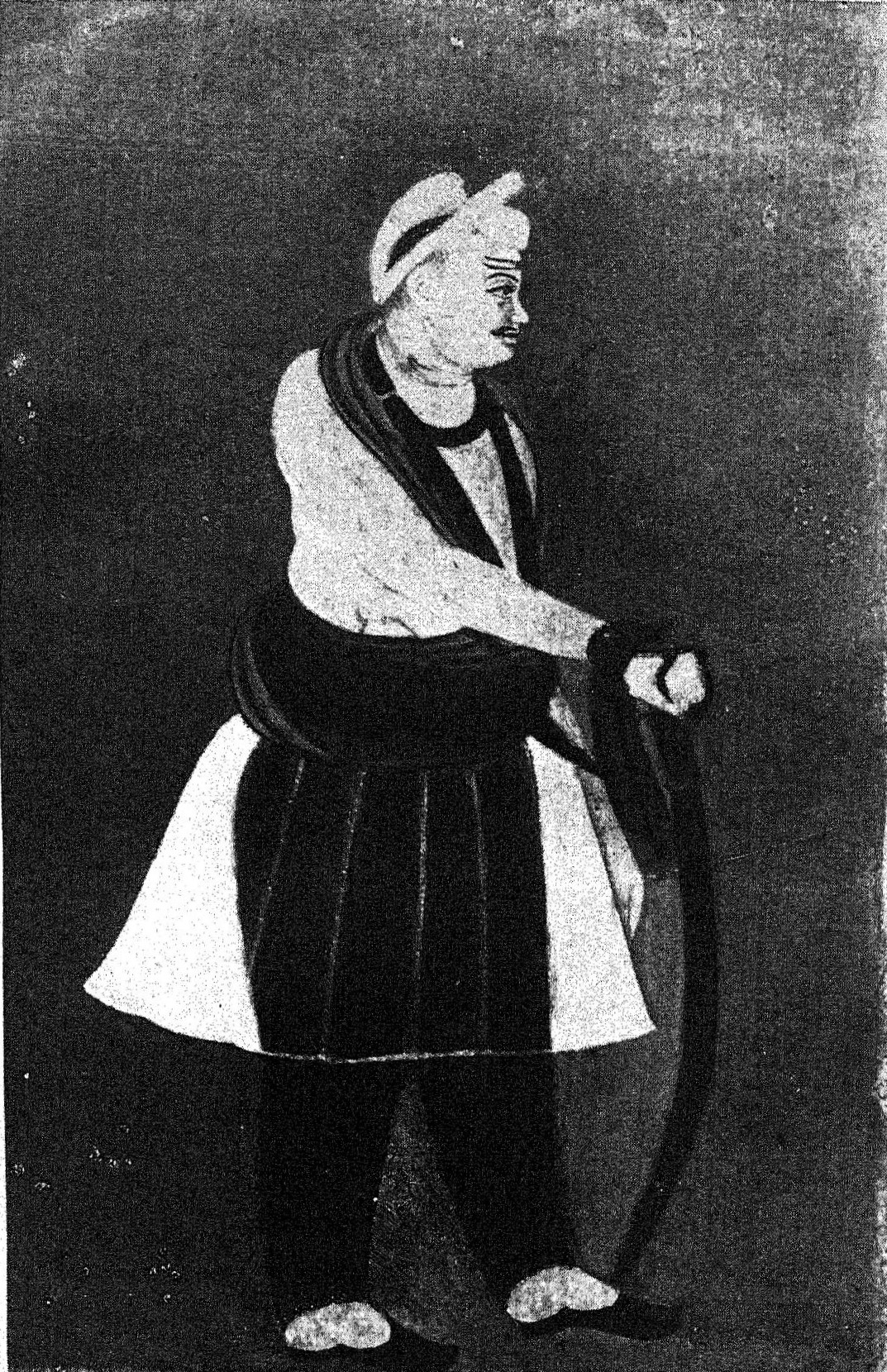
- Born: c. 1777
- Died: February 19, 1818; Ashti, Maratha Empire (present day Mohol, Maharashtra, India)
- Military career
- Allegiance: Maratha Empire
- Service years: 1812 - 19 February 1818
- Rank: Senapati
- Conflicts: Third Anglo-Maratha War

Bapu Gokhale was army chief (Senapati) of the Peshwa in the Third Anglo-Maratha War.

== Early life ==
Gokhale was born Narhar Ganesh Gokhale into the Chitpavan brahmin Gokhale gharana of Tale Khajan.

== Career ==
Gokhale was appointed commander-in -chief by Peshwa Baji Rao II with the preparations of the Third Anglo-Maratha War against the East India Company in 1818. He died on February 19, 1818, during the battle of Ashti (now in Mohol taluka, Solapur, Maharashtra) while defending the Peshwa from the company forces. He died with a sword in his hand just as he had wished to have preferred to.

== Family and descendants ==
Gokhale had two wives. The first wife had two children. Their first child died early. Their other son, Gopal was killed during the Battle of Ashti. He did not have any children with his second wife Yamunabai. She went to Satara after her husband's death. He was also a great-uncle of Dwarka Gokhale, wife of Chandrashekhar Agashe.

== See also ==
- Balaji Pant Natu
- Maratha Empire
