= Nalini Sengupta =

Indian educationist and mountaineer

Personal information
- Nationality: India
- Born: Pune, Maharashtra, India
- Occupation: Mountaineer

Nalini Sengupta is an Indian educationist and mountaineer, best known for serving as the founder and principal of Vidya Valley School since 2001, and being the namesake of Mount Nalini in the Himalayas, after it was first summited in 2015.

In 1970, Sengupta graduated as a mountaineering coach of the first mountaineering course for women offered by the National Institute of Mountaineering and Allied Sports. In July 2015, a team of 40 mountaineers from the Guardian Giripremi Institute of Mountaineering summited peak 5260 in the Himalayas, near the Hampta Pass region of Manali, Himachal Pradesh. Being the first summiteers of the peak, the institute was given the honour to name the peak by the Indian Mountaineering Foundation. The peak was named after Sengupta, making her the first resident of Pune to have a Himalayan peak named after them. In July 2016, she led a team of 16 to trek to the base camp of Shea Goru.

In 2001, Sengupta founded Vidya Valley School in Aundh, Pune. As principal, she has advocated for environmentalism in education, specifically against the bursting of firecrackers in India during Diwali, and the promotion of eco-friendly sewage treatment and water harvesting which have been implemented at her school.
