= Maharashtra Mandal =

A Maharashtra Mandal is a social group formed to preserve the culture of those born in the Indian state of Maharashtra, and speakers of its language, Marathi, who live outside the state. Such groups exist in India and throughout the world, examples being in Helsinki, Brussels, Houston and Dar es Salaam. The Mandal was founded in 1924 by Shivrampant Damle.

== See also ==
- Marathi people
