= Shashikant Dhotre =

Indian artist

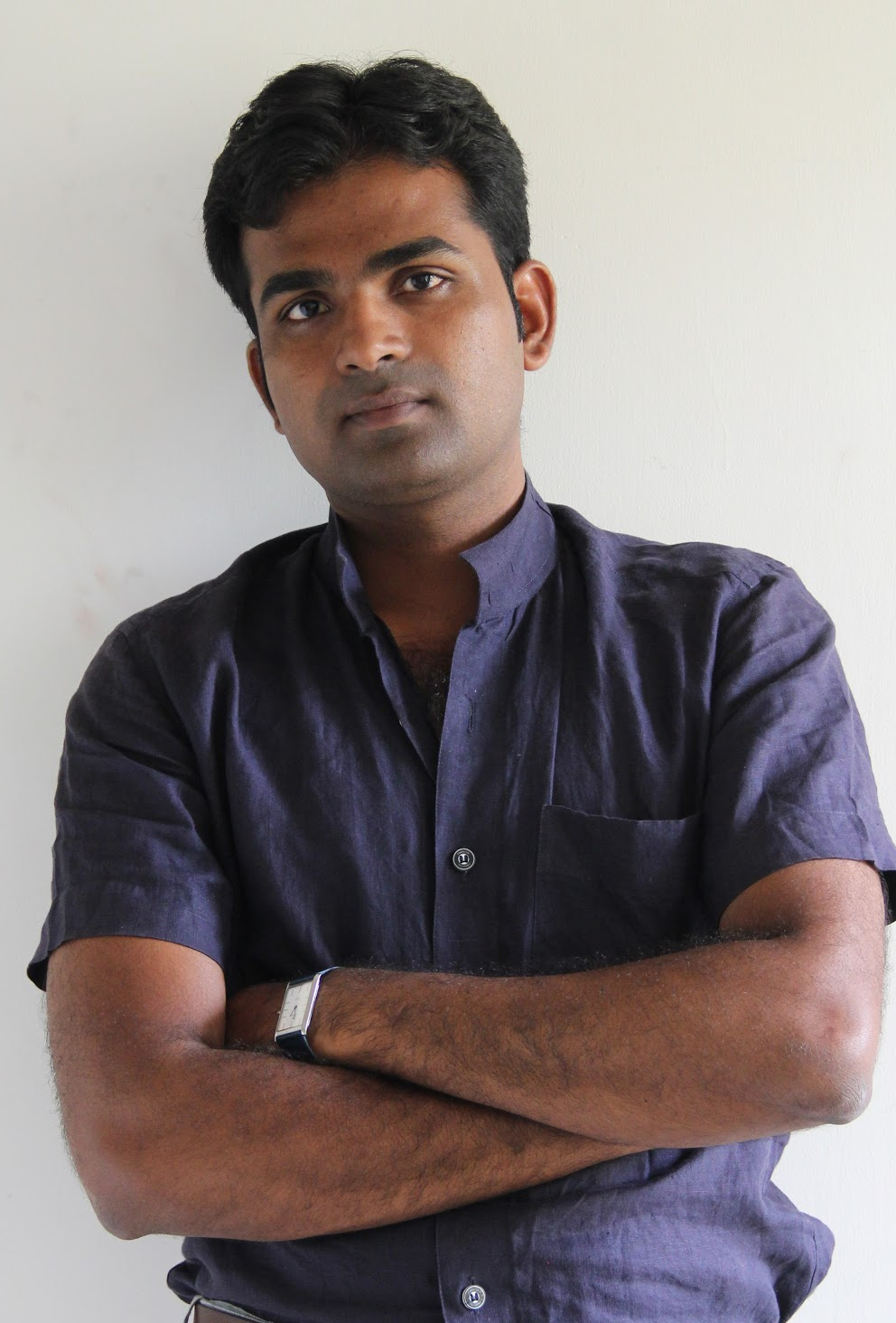
- Shashikant Vaman Dhotre
- Born: 1 April 1982 (age 44); Shirapur, Mohol/Solapur, Maharashtra
- Known for: Painter
- Awards: Kohinoor of Maharashtra] (2015); Maharashtrian of the Year (2016)
- Website: www.shashikantdhotre.com

Shashikant Dhotre (born April 1, 1982) is an Indian artist.

== Early life ==
Shashikant Dhotre was born in Shirapur village, India. Dhotre joined Bachelor of Fine Arts in painting in Sir Jamsetjee Jeejebhoy School of Art, Mumbai in year 2003. He had to leave the college halfway due to financial constraints. Since then, he started his professional work and developed an expertise in colour pencil and pastel on paper.

== Awards ==
- 2007 – Arts Society of India
- 2009 – First prize at Bombay Arts Society Awards
- 2010 – Aashadeep Award, Maharashtra
- 2011 – First prize at India Art Festival Awards
- 2013 – First prize at State Art Exhibition Awards
- 2015 – Kohinoor of Maharashtra Awards
- 2016 – Maharashtrian of the Year Awards

== Exhibition ==
He participated in 11 selected group exhibition And more than 10 solo exhibition 'Jaagar' was the Travelling show, a journey of Art exhibition in famous cities of Maharashtra.
