= Balaji Pant Natu =

Indian Nationalist

Balaji Pant Natu was a spy working for the British against the Peshwa Bajirao II during the era of Maratha Confederacy in the Third Anglo-Maratha War. He came from the powerful Natu family of Pune. When the British forces entered Shanivar Wada on November 18, 1817, Natu unfurled the Union Jack over the building. Before he became an agent for the British governor of Bombay, Montstuart Elphinstone, he served the Raste family.

Along with the installation of Pratapsinh Bhonsale as the symbolic Chatrapati by the British, Balaji Pant Natu was selected to be his assistant. However, there was always hostility between Chitpavan Natu and the Maratha raja due to tensions based on caste lines. The hostility became worse and turned into an open quarrel when Natu was asked by his employer, the British Resident James Grant (later known as James Grant Duff), to rein in Pratapsinh on his personal spending. By 1819 Grant had been monitoring Natu for abuse of power. However Natu complained to Grant that the raja claimed that Grant had told him about Natu being involved in bribery. Due to this, Natu no longer wanted to work under the raja and instead offered his services to Grant himself. Grant offered Natu a new position but Natu did not accept it because he thought it amounted to simply being a karkun or clerk. According to Grant's reports the departure of Natu was a very joyful event for the chatrapati and his mother.

== See also ==
- Bapu Gokhale
- Maratha Empire
