= Anant Gadgil =

Indian politician and architect

Anant Gadgil (born 18 September 1956) is an Indian politician and architect, who has been a member of the Maharashtra Legislative Council 2014 to 2022. He is a member of the Indian National Congress party. Born into the Gadgil gharana of Velneshwar-Wai, Gadgil is the son of Vitthalrao Gadgil and a grandson of Narhar Vishnu Gadgil. He graduated with a Bachelor of Architecture degree from Mumbai University, before going on to finish his Master of Architecture in the United States. He is married and resides in Mumbai.

== Literary writing ==
Chimajiappa Punekar (Marathi Book)

Pinches & Punches

== Award ==
Anantrao Gadgil's book Chimajiappa Punekar has won the Maharashtra Sahitya Parishad Award for Humorous Writing.
