= Sunil Deodhar =

Indian politician

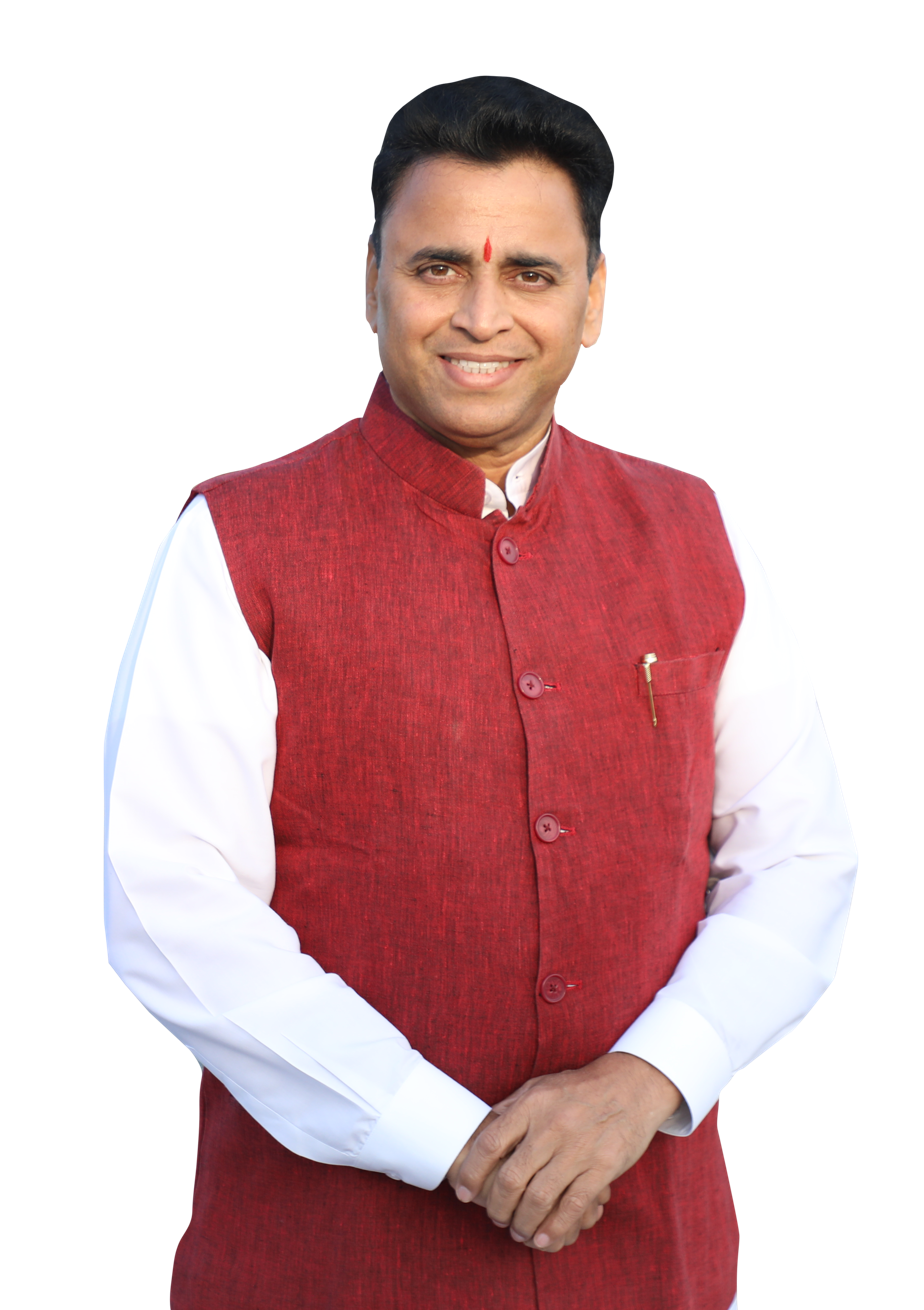
- Sunil Deodhar in 2020

Personal details
- Born: 29 September 1965 (age 60) Pune
- Party: Bharatiya Janata Party
- Occupation: Politician
- Website: sunildeodhar.in

Sunil Deodhar (born 29 September 1965) is an Indian Politician. He was the National Secretary of the Bhartiya Janata Party. Currently, he is Co-incharge of BJP Andhra Pradesh. He is a former RSS Pracharak, and son of Marathi journalist V N Deodhar. He was campaign manager for Narendra Modi in Varanasi constituency in 2014. He founded an NGO named "My Home India" for helping the people of North-East India who are living outside their states.

== Early life ==
Sunil Vishwanath Deodhar was born in Pune on 29 September 1965. He came from a Maharashtrian Hindu family of the Bramhin caste. His father, Vishwanath Deodhar, a renowned Marathi journalist, from Pune, who has written a biography on Pt. Deendayal Upadhyay.

His schooling was done in Nutan Marathi Vidyalaya in Pune. Then he completed his M.Sc. B.Ed. from Mumbai University, Honorary D.Lit of Arunachal University, and started his career as a teacher in 1988. For 3 Years, he taught Mathematics & Science to school going children. While working as an Assistant Teacher in Vidyanidhi High School, he took a challenge to bring the result of class 10 from a maximum of 19% to 100%, with tremendous efforts & various innovative experiments on students, majority of whom are slum-dwellers, he could bring the result to 90%. Also, while working as an RSS swayamsevak in Andheri East, he innovated Abhyasika for poor students which Inturn became instrumental in attracting young members towards RSS.

== Social work ==
He completed RSS 3-Year training in 1988. In 1991, he became a full-time RSS Pracharak & was sent to the most challenging region of India - North East as a Jilha Pracharak in Meghalaya. Meghalaya was under the threat of religious conversions, insurgency & anti-nationalism. In his 8 long years of dedicated service in the state of Meghalaya, he came up with many innovative experiments like ‘Bharat Mera Ghar’ Yatra, and worked for hostels in Maharashtra, schools in Meghalaya, and also encouraged women in entrepreneurship for making them self-reliant. He did path-breaking work and established RSS in a very difficult state i.e. Meghalaya & returned to Maharashtra as Vibhag Pracharak & returned home after 11 long years. He started a business as tutors’ bureau, travel agency & promotion agency. Simultaneously, he was the Convenor of Hindu Manav Adhikar Manch of Mumbai. In 2005, he founded a nationwide volunteer organisation, My Home India, which has done humongous social work in number of field through its various verticals. He started ‘Sapno Se Apno Tak’ project wherein the organisation has reunited more than 3200 lost children with their parents.

== Political career ==
In 2010, he joined active politics & was appointed as the National Convenor of North East India Sampark Cell of world’s largest political party, Bharatiya Janata Party (BJP). He worked as full-time vistarak in Gujarat for the then Chief Minister Shri Narendra Modi who was contesting for the consecutive 3 time as the Chief Minister of Gujarat. Impressed by his hard work in Gujarat, PM Modi appointed him as his campaign manager for Varanasi Lok Sabha constituency. Subsequently, in 2016, he was appointed as the party’s in-charge of Tripura state which was ruled by the Marxist Party for more than 2 decades. Under proficient guidance of the then BJP President Shri Amit Shah, with PM Modi’s tremendous popular image, through his hard work on ground, he became one of the major instruments to finish 25-year old communist rule in the state. He was a National Secretary of BJP and co-incharge of Andhra Pradesh from July 2018 to July 2023. In 2018, he became Co-incharge of BJP Andhra Pradesh.
