= Ashok B. Gokhale =

Indian diplomat

Ashok Bhalchandra Gokhale is a retired Indian diplomat. He served for the Indian Foreign Service as Chargé d'affaires in Embassy of India, Washington, D.C.

He was born in Ranchi (Bihar) on October 28, 1930. He is Bachelor of Science, the son of Manorama and B. K. Gokhale, is married to Surekha, their sons are Jaideep and Pradeep.

- From 1953 to 1954 he was Officer of the Imperial Bank of India.
- 1955 he joined the Indian Foreign Service.
- From 1957 to 1958 he served in Vienna.
- From 1958 to 1962 he served in Bonn.
- From 1962 to 1965 he served in the Ministry of External Affairs (India)
- From 1965 to 1968 he was Chargé d'affaires in Amman.
- From 1968 to 1971 he was Counselor and Deputy Chief of Mission in Paris.
- From 1972 to 1974 he was ambassador to Bhutan.
- 1978 he was Chargé d'affaires in Embassy of India, Washington, D.C.
- From 1980 to 1984 he was ambassador to Thailand.
- On February 26, 1984 He succeeded Akbar Mirza Khaleeli as ambassador to Tehran.
- From February 26, 1984 to 1987 he was ambassador to Iran.
- From 1987 to 1988 he was Sec, Min of External Affairs.

== Bibliography ==
- Inside three monarchies and six republics: memoirs of an Indian diplomat by Ashok Gokhale, 2007.
