= Hampta Pass =

Hamta Pass
- Mountain Pass
- Nickname: Hamta
- Location within Himachal Pradesh Location within India
- Coordinates: 31.963024°N 77.453296°E
- Country: India
- State: Himachal Pradesh
- District: Kullu
- Elevation: 4,270 m (14,010 ft)

Languages
  - Official: Hindi
  - Regional: Kulvi

Hampta Pass is a corridor/pass in the Himalayas, between the Chandra Valley in Lahaul and the Kullu valley of Himachal Pradesh, India. The pass is named after Hampta Village, below Sethan village. Lower Himalayan shepherds use the pass in summer for its high altitude grasslands in the summer, when the desert of Lahaul is barren.

== Description ==
The pass includes vertical rock walls, waterfalls, hanging glaciers, pinewoods, rhododendron forests, open meadows, and small lakes, as well as 6,000-metre-tall (20,000 ft) peaks such as Mt. Deo Tibba and Mount Indrasan. Wildflowers and herbs grow between 3000 meters to 3800 meters.

== Treks ==
Hikers travel from the Kullu valley through Hampta Pass, and into the region of Lahaul. The route includes glaciers and fast-flowing rivers, making it challenging but doable for some beginners. Some hikers continue to Chandrataal lake.

The nearest hub is Manali, in Himachal Pradesh. Most itineraries include transport from Manali to Jobri, from where the trek begins. Depending on the trek itinerary, it typically takes 3 to 4 days to complete the trek. Hikers may stop at Chika, Balu ka Ghera, Shea Goru, or Chhatru.

== Gallery ==
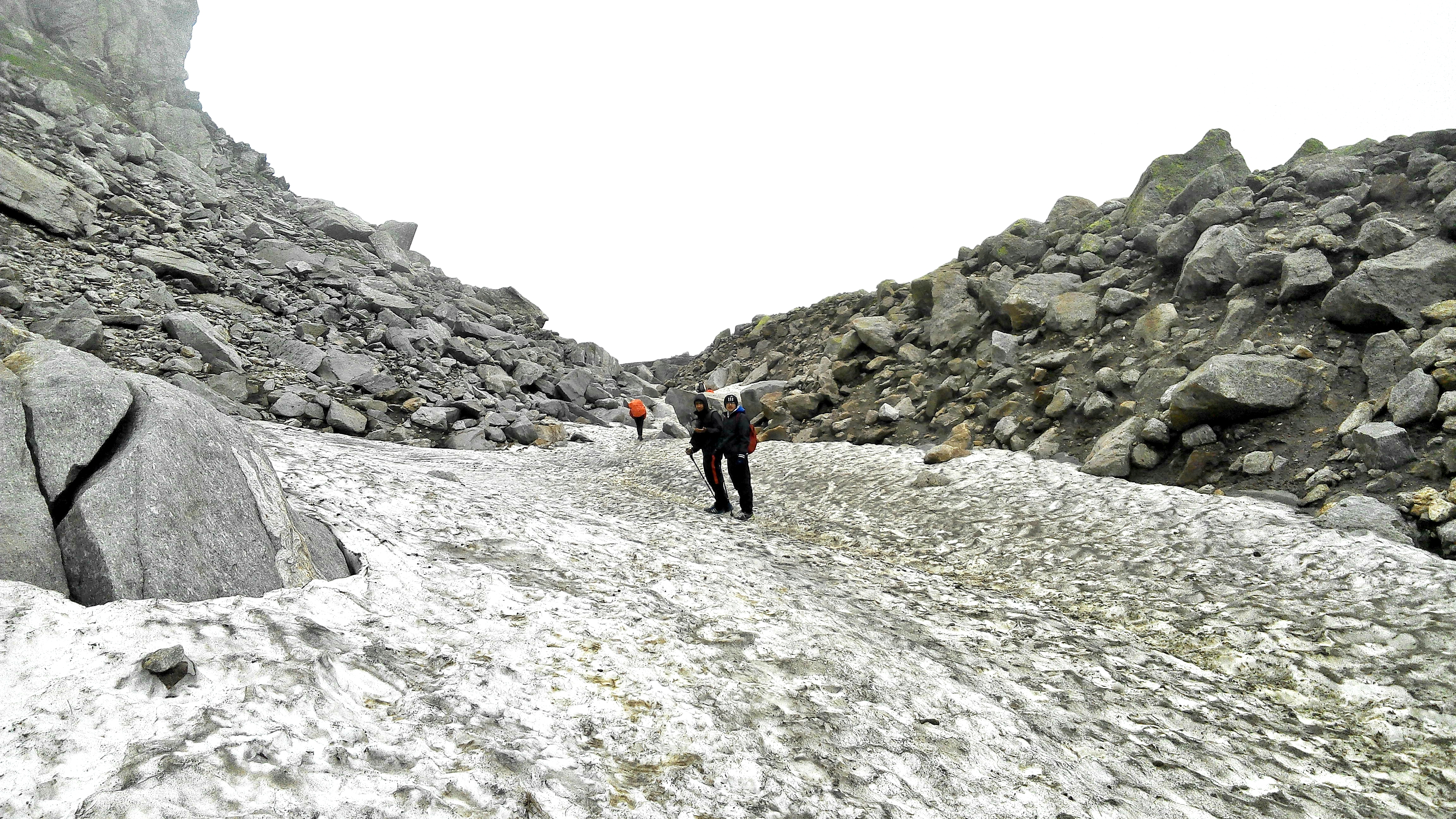
Hamta Pass corridor

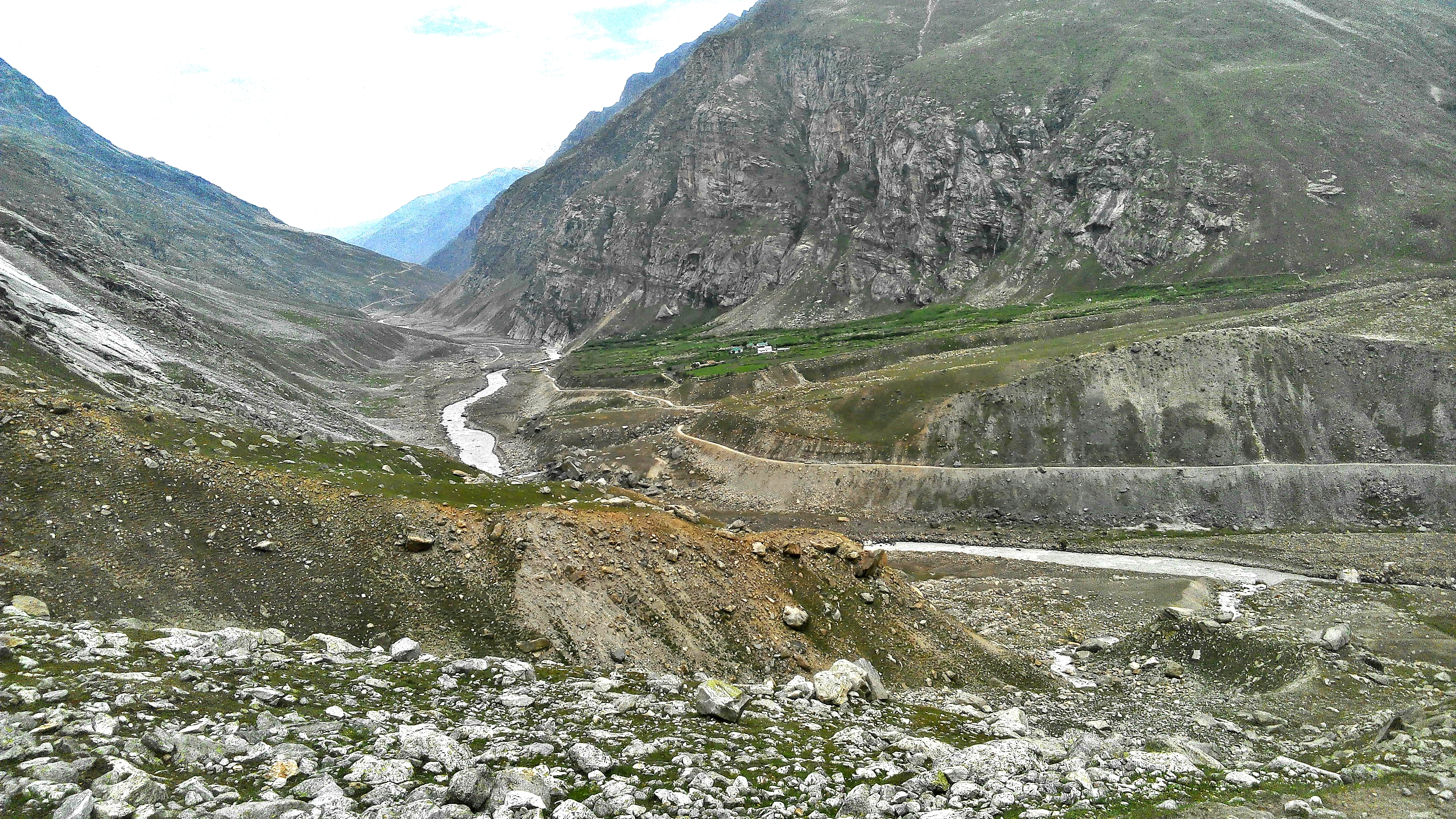
Chhatru Settlement in the Spiti Valley from Shia Goru

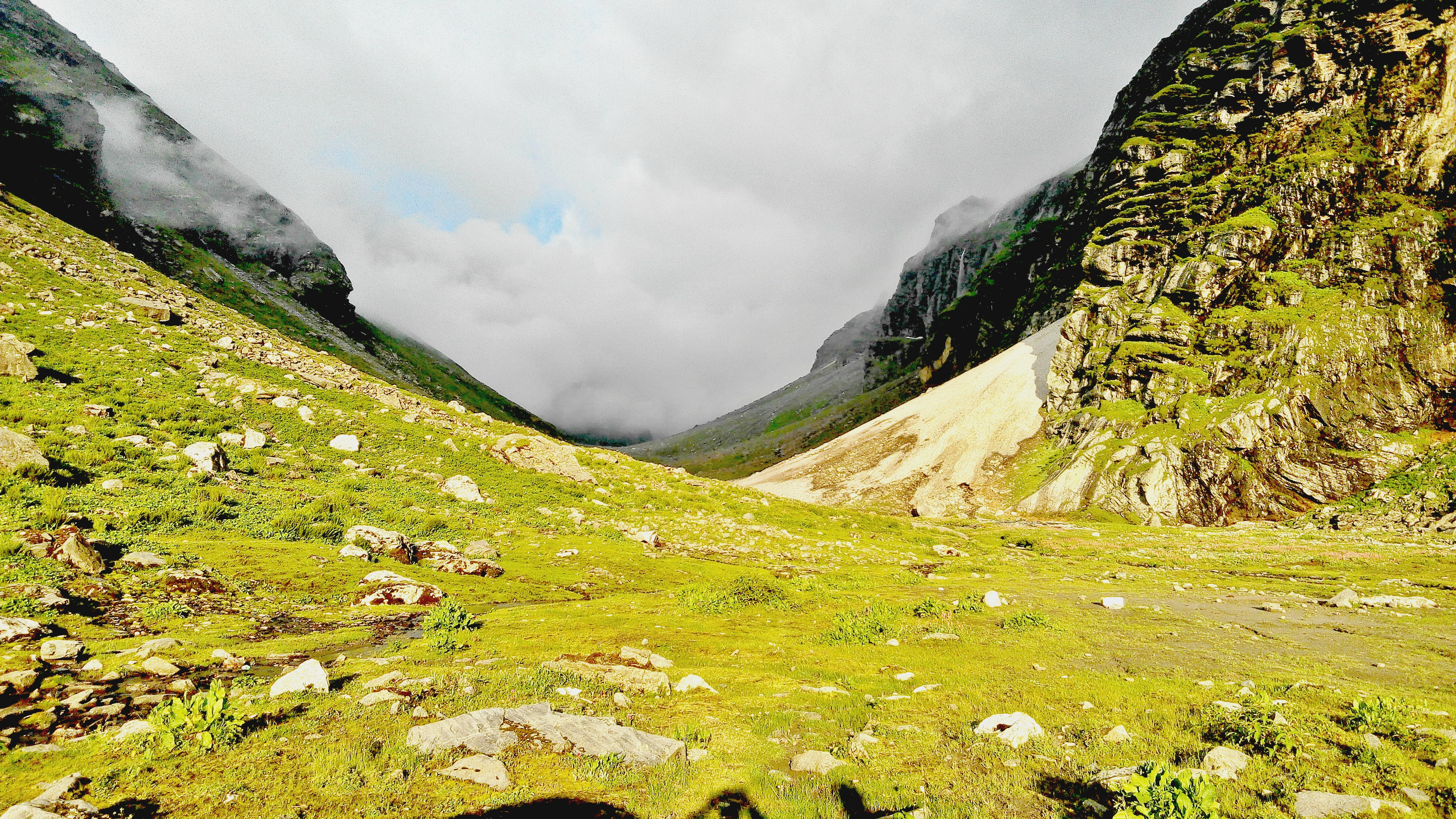
Valley

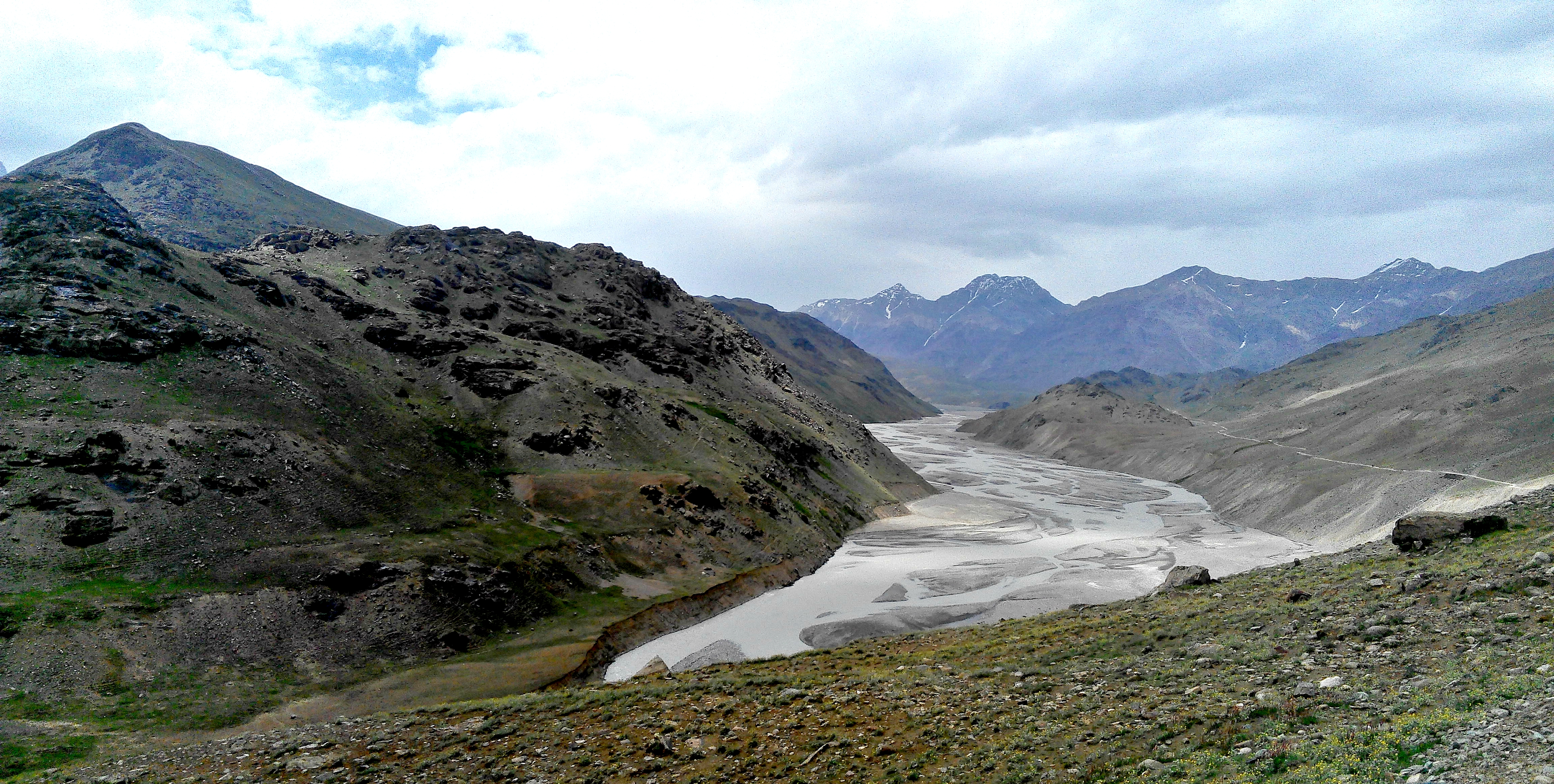
River

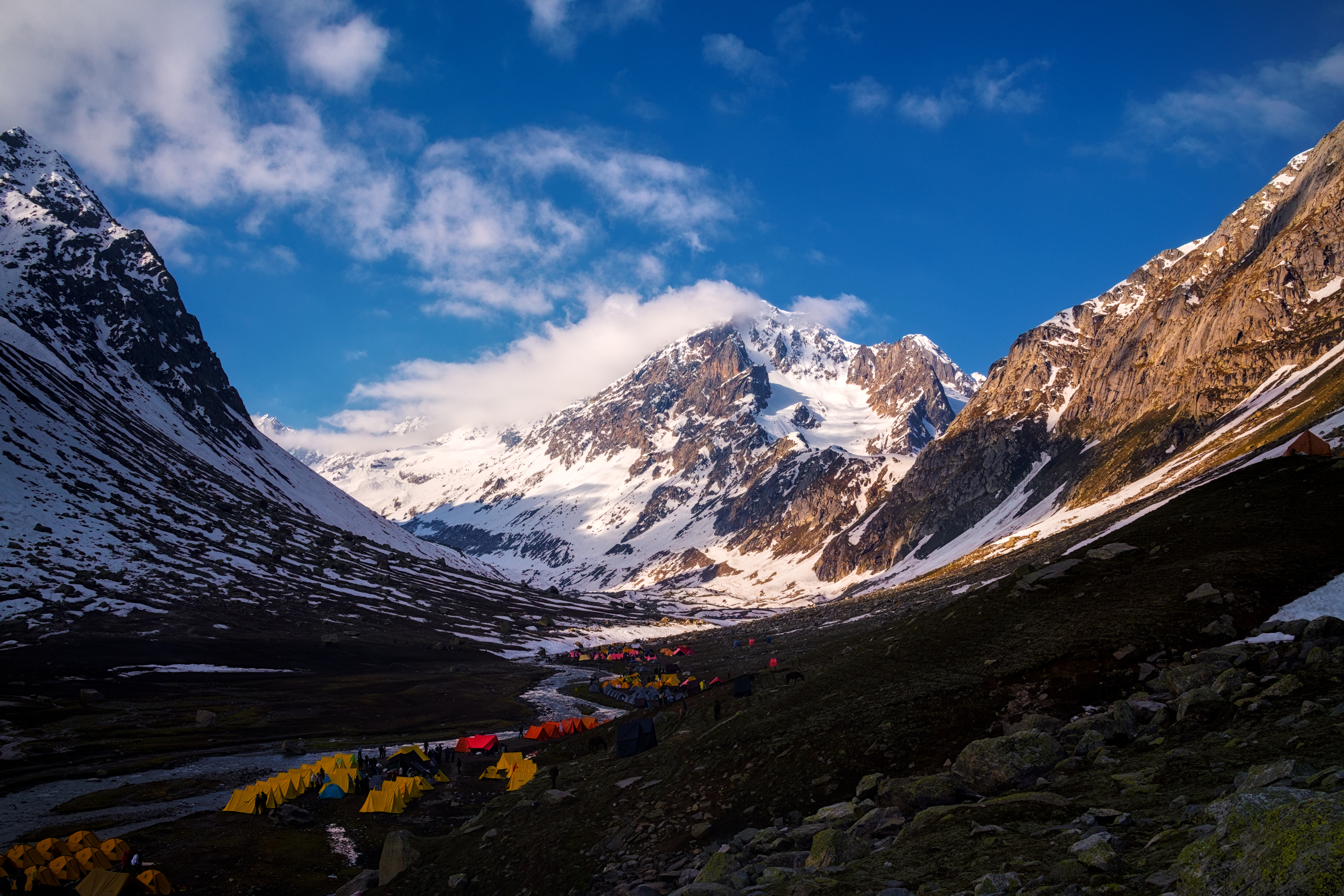
Shea Goru campsite

Panorama view (3777m)

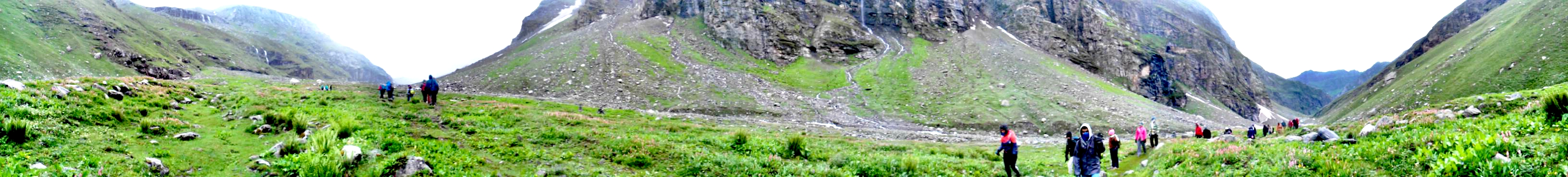
The Panorama of Balu Ka Gera
