= Satish Pande =

Bird lover and medical doctor

Satish Pande is an Indian medical doctor, conservationist and researcher from Pune. He is an interventional radiologist at KEM Hospital, Pune. He also is the founder of the Ela Foundation, which works on nature education and conservation. He is a Fellow of the Maharashtra Academy of Sciences and the Linnean Society of London, and has published numerous studies on wild birds.

== Works ==
1. Study of impact of wind farms on birds at the Bhambarwadi Plateau in the Northwestern Ghats
