= Shripad Mahadev Mate =

Marathi writer and a social reformer (1886–1957)

Shripad Mahadev Mate (2 September 1886 – 25 December 1957) was a Marathi writer and a social reformer from Bombay State, India.

== Life ==
Mate was a teacher of English and Marathi literature by profession. Although he took up writing at the relatively late age of forty-four, during the remainder of his life he wrote eclectically and copiously on a variety of social, scientific, biographical and historical subjects. He was deeply troubled by the social scourge of untouchability in contemporary India, and wrote several short stories as well as essays arguing for the abolition of this practice. Although he was a Brahmin by birth and retained a spiritual affinity for the cultural and religious tenets of Hinduism, his writings show his sustained scepticism towards many of its dogmas.

Mate was born in the town of Shirpur in Vidarbha. He went to New English School, Satara and acquired his university education (up to an M.A.) in Pune. For a few years, he served as a teacher at the Nutan Marathi Vidyalaya, Pune and later as a professor at Sir Parshurambhau College. His son Madhukar Mate (born 1930) was an eminent archaeologist with expertise in medieval India. Mate presided over the Marathi Sahitya Sammelan at Sangli in 1943.

== Notable literary works ==
- रसवंतीची जन्मकथा (1943) discusses the birth and development of human languages on evolutionary principles.
- संत-पंत-तंत (1957) is an overview of devotional poets (संतकवी), erudite poets (पंडितकवी) and bards (शाहीर) in the Marathi linguistic tradition.
- उपेक्षितांचे अंतरंग (1941), अनामिका (1946), माणुसकीचा गहिवर (1949) and भावनांचे पाझर (1954) are some of his collections of short stories. A unifying thread through all of these stories is the compassionate portrayal of the lives of tribals and untouchable castes, such as महार, मांग, रामोशी and कातोडी.
- साहित्यधारा (1943), विचार-शलाका (1950) and विचारमंथन (1962) contain argumentative essays on social and religious themes.
- परशुरामचरित्र (1937), गीतातत्त्वविमर्श (1957) and रामदासांचे प्रपंचविज्ञान (1960) contain his unorthodox interpretations of familiar mythological themes.
