= Satyawan Damle =

S. G. Damle
- Born: Satyawan; India
- Citizenship: India
- Occupations: Professor, researcher, educator, administrator

Satyawan Damle or S. G. Damle, worked as the vice chancellor and director-general at Maharishi Markandeshwar University, Mullana, Haryana, India.

== Biography ==
Damle was born on February 2, at Nagpur. He completed his Bachelor of Dental Surgery (BDS) in 1974 from Nagpur University, Master of Dental Surgery (MDS) in 1982 from Postgraduate Institute of Medical Education and Research, Chandigarh, India) and obtained his Ph.D in 2010 from Annamalai University, Tamilnadu .

== Career ==
Before joining as Vice Chancellor of Maharishi Markandeshwar University, Mullana Ambala, Haryana, in 2008, he worked as the Joint Municipal Commissioner of Municipal Corporation of Greater Mumbai (2003-2007). He has also worked as the dean, faculty of Dentistry at University of Mumbai, Bombay (1999-2006). He was the Dean of one of the premier dental institutes of the country i.e. Nair Hospital Dental College, Mumbai for 13 years.

He traveled nationally and internationally as Invited Speaker, Keynote Speaker, and Guest Speaker and represented India at various forums and conferences including WHO, FDI, APDC/APDF. He was Chairman of Scientific Committee for the 112th World Dental Congress which was held at NCR New Delhi in 2014.

He is the recipient of Fellowship of Royal College of Surgeons and Physicians, Glasgow, Royal College of Surgeons, London, and Fellowship of Royal College of Surgeons, Edinburgh. He is also a Fellow of academy of Medical Educators Cardiff UK and a Fellow of National Academy of Medical Sciences, Fellow of International Academy of Medical Sciences, Fellow of Dental Research, and Fellow of Pierre Fauchard Academy. Prof. Damle conducted numerous inspections of Dental council of India, University Grants Commission. He has also been a Chairman / Member of Peer Team visits of NAAC (National Assessment and Accreditation Council).

== Publications ==
As far as publications are concerned, he has 151 publications to his credit with 1954 citations in Google Scholar, 1446 Researchgate citations with 33.56 impact points and 732 Scopus citations.

== Books ==
Books authored by him include the following:

- Text Book(s): Five editions of ‘Textbook of Pediatric Dentistry. The book is recommended by Dental Council of India and most of the Indian Universities for BDS & MDS studies Also the first indian author to write Text book of Pediatric Dentistry, published bt Bentham publishers Singapore
- Monograph(s): Manual for Dental Professionals on HIV and AIDS
- Chapters in standard text books/Volume of/Proceedings of Major
- Oral Health in India – A report of the Multi centric Study, Ministry of Health & Family Welfare, Govt. of India & World Health Organization
- Dental Council of India- oral health survey and fluoride mapping

== Research papers ==
Selected research papers include:

- S G Damle, India, Fluoridated dentifrices: towards a cavity free future. International Dental Journal (2009) Vol.59/No.4 (Supplement 1): 237-243.
- Damle S.G, Nadkarni UM. Calcium hydroxide and zinc oxide eugenol as root canal filling materials in primary molars: a comparative study. Australian Endodontic Journal. 2005 Dec; 31 (3): 114-9.
- Satyawan Gangaramji Damle, VikasBengude, Sheeba Saini. Evaluation of Ability of Dentifrices to Remineraliaze Artificial Caries-Like Lesions. Dental Research Journal DRJ Vo.7, No 1 (2010) Page 7-11.
- Damle SG, Doiphode G. A comparison of anticaries and antiplaque efficacy of a fluoridated dentifrice containing 1000 ppm sodium monofluoro phosphate + calcium glycerophosphate and non-fluoridated dentifrice: a one-and-a-half-year clinical trial. [JODDD] Journal of Dental Research, Dental Clinics, Dental Prospects, Page 1-6.
- S.G. Damle, A.K. Jetpurwala, Saini, P. Gupta. Evaluation of Oral Health Status as an Indicator of Disease Progression in HIV Positive Children. Brazilian Research in Pediatric Dentistry & Integrated Clinic Vol 10 No 2 (2010) 151-156.
