= Sitaram Keshav Damle =

Indian journalist

Sitaram Keshav Damle was an eminent Marathi journalist. He helped edit the newspaper Kesari. He was also the editor of Rashtramat and Rashtrodava. He founded the Young National Dramatic Company. Perhaps he is best known for being the younger brother of Keshavsuta or Keshavsut who published Keshavsut's poems posthumously, eleven years after his death. These poems gave Keshavsut the rank as the Father of Modern Marathi Poetry.
