= Dajikaka Gadgil =

Indian jeweller

Anant "Dajikaka" Gadgil
- Born: 11 September 1915; Sangli, Bombay Presidency, British Raj
- Died: 10 January 2014 (aged 98); Pune, Maharashtra, India
- Occupations: Jeweller, industrialist, writer
- Known for: Founding P. N. Gadgil Jewellers & Company in Pune in 1958

Anant "Dajikaka" Gadgil (11 September 1915 – 10 January 2014) was an Indian jeweller, industrialist and writer. He is best known for founding the P. N. Gadgil Jewellers & Company in Pune in 1958.

== Early life and family ==
Gadgil was born on 11 September 1915, in Sangli, to Ganesh and Yashoda Gadgil (née Mahajan), of the Gadgil gharana of Dongare-Kondhe. His mother was his father's third wife, and Gadgil had two sisters. He had three half siblings through his father's second and fifth marriages. Gadgil married Tarabai Abhyankar, and the couple had two daughters and a son. She would adopt the name Kamalabai upon marriage. He was a great-grandson of Ganesh Gadgil, and a nephew of Purshottam Narayan Gadgil.

== Career ==
Gadgil initially began work as a jeweller at the P. N. Gadgil Jewellers & Sons store in Sangli in 1938, moving to Pune to set up a branch of the family business at Laxmi Road in 1958. During his lifetime, he was lauded for his business acumen and philanthropic work by his contemporaries and the press, most notably for surviving his business through The Gold Act of 1968, and fundraising for victims of the 1993 Latur earthquake.

Gadgil was the recipient of several awards throughout his career; most notably being lauded by the Pune Municipal Corporation on several occasions, receiving the Rotary Excellence Award from the Rotary Club of Pune, and was awarded an honorary fellowship by the World Gold Council. In 2007, he published an autobiography entitled Think Pure.... In 2009, he co-authored a book in Marathi on the Ganges river entitled Ganga.

== Death and legacy ==
Gadgil died on 10 January 2014, aged 98, in Pune. He was succeeded in business by his son and grandson. In late 2014, the Dajikaka Gadgil Gold Museum was opened at the P. N. Gadgil Jewellers store in Hadapsar. In August 2016, he became the namesake of the Dajikaka Karandak, an inter-collegiate one-act play competition.

== List of works ==
- Gadgil, Dajikaka (2007). Think pure ... Pune: Ameya Prakashan. ISBN 978-81-903514-7-8. OCLC 463682583.
- Gadgil, Dajikaka; Halic, Julian (2009). Ganga (in Marathi). Ameya Prakashan. ISBN 978-81-903514-4-7.
