= Shirapur =

Village in Maharashtra

Coordinates: 33°46′N 75°03′E

- Village
- Interactive map of Shirapur
- Country: India
- State: Maharashtra
- District: Ahmadnagar

Government
  - Type: Panchayati raj (India)
  - Body: Gram panchayat

Languages
  - Official: Marathi
- Time zone: UTC+5:30 (IST)
- Telephone code: 022488
- Vehicle registration: MH-16,17
- Lok Sabha constituency: Ahmednagar
- Vidhan Sabha constituency: Parner
- Website: maharashtra.gov.in

Shirapur is a village in Parner taluka in Ahmednagar district of state of Maharashtra, India.

== Gramapanchayat Sarapanch ==
Janatai Bhaskar Uchale

== Geography and climate ==
Shirapur is surrounded by Rahuri Taluka towards the east, Shirur Taluka towards the west, Shrigonda Taluka towards the south, Sangamner Taluka towards the north. The village is well connected with Aalephata, Alkuti, Jambut and Nighoj. The Taluka headquarter viz Parner, is located 27 km away and District headquarter viz Ahemadnagar is located appx 65 km away. The village is located in the rain shadow area of the Sahyadris. It has an arid climate. Irrigation from the river Kukadi and Canal from wells serve most of the village. Crops include sugar cane, bajra, groundnuts and pomegranates.

== Demographics ==
Hinduism (90% of the population) is the largest religion, followed by other religions such as Islam, Jainism. All the sects/religions coexist in a peaceful manner participating in each other's celebrations and functions. Major castes are dhangar and Marathas, both of whom share significant similar livelihood patterns. As both groups do farming and livestock rearing. Major families include Chate, Uchale, Ghode, Narsale, Shinare, Lokhande, Vadne, Khamkar, Khomane, Lonkar, Yede.

== Religion ==
The majority of the population in the village is Hindu. The village is famous for Temple of Shiddheshwar and Hanuman. The village is also famous for 'Kusti' (Wrestling).

== Economy ==
The majority of the population has farming as their primary occupation. Along with farming near about 60% population is doing dairy related work.

== See also ==
- Villages in Parner taluka
