= Nutan Marathi Vidyalaya =

School in Pune, Maharashtra

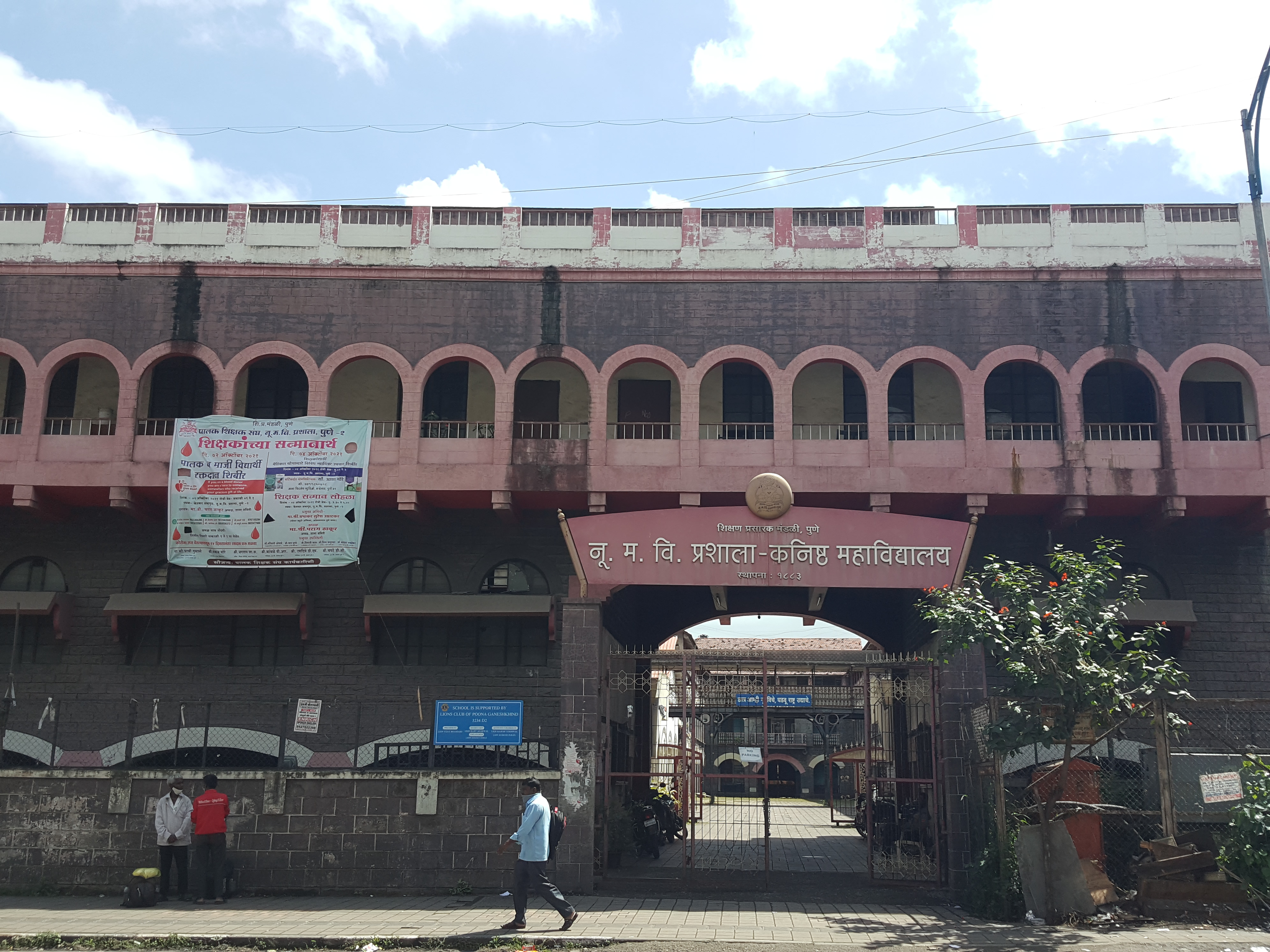
- Motto: We, the students of Nu Ma Vi, would create the nation of tomorrow
- Established: 1883
- Location: Pune, India; 18.5154627°N 73.8548891°E

Nutan Marathi Vidyalaya (NMV) is one of the oldest schools in Pune, Maharashtra, India. The school was founded by the Shikshan Prasarak Mandali, an educational charity, on 1 January 1883. The school has a secondary school section for students in grade five to ten and a junior college for students in grade eleven and twelve.

== Notable faculty ==
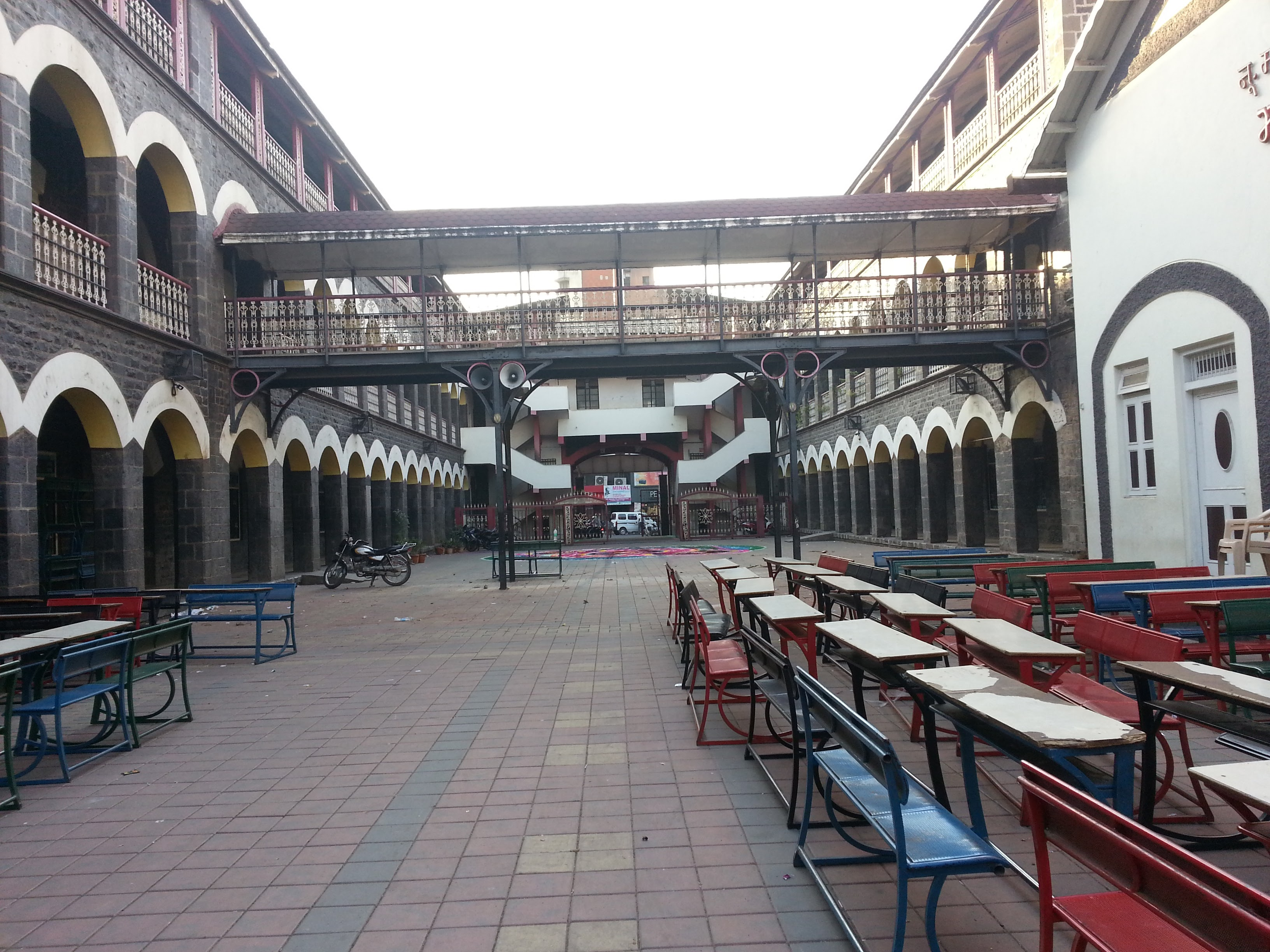
Nutan Marathi Vidyalaya School building

- Sonopant (Shankar Vaman) Dandekar (1896–1969), philosopher and educationalist.
- Prahlad Narhar Joshi (1924-), writer and former headteacher of the school.
- Shripad Mahadev Mate (1886–1957), writer and former teacher.
- Datto Vaman Potdar (1890–1979), historian.
- Vinayak Kulkarni, Marathi writer and researcher on Marathi Saint Literature
- Chandrashekhar Agashe (1888–1956), founder of Brihan Maharashtra Sugar Syndicate

== Notable alumni ==
- Chintaman Vinayak Joshi (1892–1963), Marathi humorist and a researcher in Pali literature.
- Sane Guruji (24 Dec 1899 – 11 June 1950) - Indian freedom fighter, social reformer, teacher, author and poet in Marathi literature
- Yeshwant Vishnu Chandrachud (1920–2008), longest-serving Chief Justice of India.
- Dr. Mohan Agashe (1947-) - actor on Marathi stage and in Films. Psychiatrist.
- Chandrashekhar Agashe (1888–1956), founder of Brihan Maharashtra Sugar Syndicate
- Harshad Khadiwale
- Ashwin Chitale, actor.
- Subodh Bhave, a renowned Marathi film actor and director.
- Jasraj Jayant Joshi - Marathi singer
- Sanjeev Abhyankar, Hindustani Classical Singer Mewati Gharana
- Anand Bhate - Marathi Singer in Hindustani Classical Music, and Marathi Natyasangeet
- Shivrampant Damle (1900–1977), Indian educationist

== See also ==
- List of schools in Pune
