= Bandu Dhotre =

Indian Conservationist and Activist

Bandu Dhotre (born 1979) is an Indian wildlife activist and president of environmental organisation Eco-Pro. For his work in rescuing wildlife, India Today has identified him as a "local hero". He has received National Youth Award in year 2013–14 by the Ministry of Youth Affairs and Sports for his enormous contributions in the field of wildlife conservation and community service.
