= Velneshwar =

Village in Maharashtra

Coordinates: 17°23′N 73°12′E

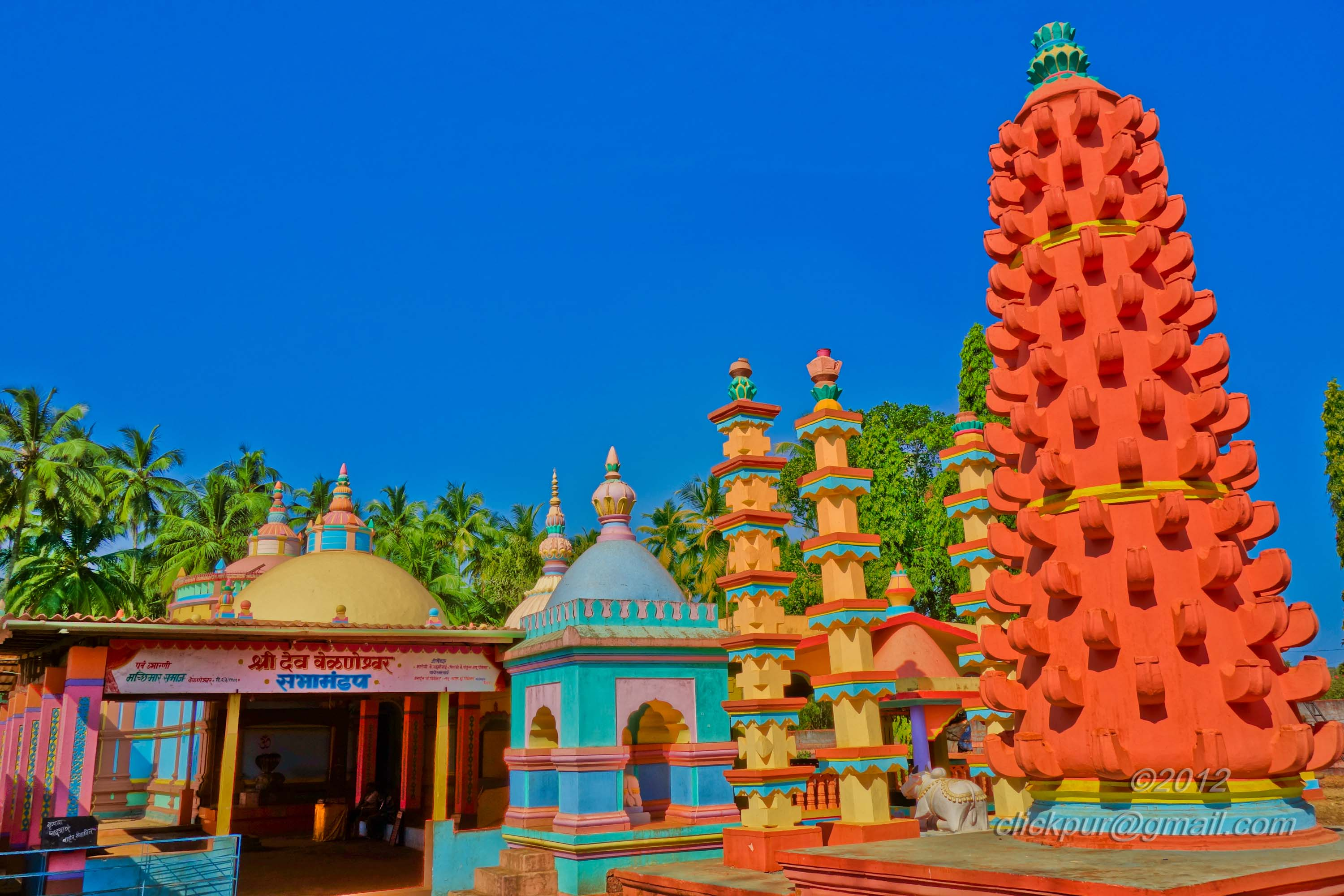
Temple in Velneshwar

Velneshwar is a village on the western coast of Maharashtra, India, about 70 kilometres (43 mi) from Ratnagiri.

Velneshwar is known for its rock-free beach. There is an old Shiva temple near Velneshwar which is frequently visited by pilgrims. The village follows the Smarta tradition and the people of the village worship Lord Ganesha, Shiva, Vishnu, Surya and Durga.

This village is considered to be the root of the Gokhale, Raste (Gokhale), Gadgil, Govande, Savarkar, Tulpule, Velankar and Ghag families, now residing in Nayashi, Dahivali and some other villages in Ratnagiri district, and has their family shrine.
