= Chintaman Vinayak Joshi =

Indian Marathi writer

- Born: 19 January 1892; Pune, Maharashtra, India
- Died: 21 November 1963 (aged 71); Mumbai, Maharashtra, India
- Education: B.A., M.A.
- Alma mater: Fergusson College
- Occupations: Middle school teacher; college teacher; writer
- Known for: Humorist, Essayist, Scholar of Pali and Buddhism

Chintaman Vinayak Joshi (19 January 1892 - 21 November 1963) was a Marathi humorist and a researcher in Pali literature. He hailed from Maharashtra, India, and was popularly known as Chin. Vi. Joshi. Joshi was known for his humorous writing. He also was a scholar of Pali and Buddhism.

A Marathi movie "Sarkari Pahune", 1942, directed by Master Vinayak, based on Joshi's writings became very successful and later so did a Doordarshan serial Chimanrao Gundyabhau, 1977 based on his writings.

Most of Joshi's books are in print as of January 2017. S D Phadnis has been one of the illustrators for Joshi's books.

== Early life and career ==
Joshi was born in Pune. After finishing his high school education in 1909 at Pune's Nutan Marathi Vidyalaya, he received a bachelor's degree in Philosophy from Fergusson College in 1913 and a master's degree in Pali and English literature from Mumbai University two years later.

During 1915-1919, Joshi taught in a high school, first, in Umaravati and then in Ratnagiri. in 1920, he joined a college in Baroda as a professor of Pali, English, and Marathi literature. For some years since 1928, he also worked part-time as a Director of Archives for the then princely state of Baroda. After retirement from the professorial work, he moved to Pune.

== Literary work ==
Besides many collections of his humorous stories, Joshi wrote biographies, children's books, historical articles, and some other highly scholarly works.

His serious works include:

- Manual of Pali (in English)
- Jatakatil Nivadak Goshti (जातकातील निवडक गोष्टी)
- 'Buddha Sampradaya (बुद्ध संप्रदाय)
- Shikawan (शिकवण)
- Adich Hajar Warshampurvicha Samaj (अडीच हजार वर्षांपूर्वीचा समाज)
- Ingraji Shishtachar (इंग्रजी शिष्टाचार)
- Samshayache Jale (संशयाचे जाळे)

Joshi's humorous works include:

- चिमणरावाचे च-हाट
- आणखी चिमणराव
- तिसर्यांदा चिमणराव
- चौथे चिमणराव
- गुंड्याभाऊ
- मोरू आणि मैना
- विनोद चिंतामणी
- वायफळाचा मळा
- एरंडाचे गुर्‍हाळ
- ओसाडवाडीचे देव
- चार दिवस सुनेचे
- ना मारो पिचकारी
- घरबशे पळपुटे
- पाल्हाळ
- मेषपात्रे
- रहाटगाडगे
- लंकावैभव
- हापूस पायरी
- संचार
- बोरीबाभळी
- स्टेशनमास्तर
- आरसा
- संचार
- आमचा पण गाव
- सोळा आणे

=== Published books ===
- Jatakatil Nivadak Goshti, 1930
- Shakyamuni Gautam, 1935
- Erandache Gurhal, 1932
- Chimanravanche Charhat, 1933
- Vayphalacha Mala, 1936
- Aankhi Chimanrav, 1944
- Osadvadiche Dev, 1946
- Gundyabhau, 1947
- Lankavaibhav, 1947
- Rahatgadagan, 1955
- Hasyachintamani, 1961
- Boribhabali, 1962
- Buddhasampraday v shikvan, 1963
