= Vitthalrao Gadgil =

Indian politician

Minister of State for Civil Aviation
- Prime Minister: Rajeev Gandhi

Personal details
- Born: 22 September 1928
- Died: 2001 (aged 72–73)
- Party: INC

Vitthalrao Gadgil (22 September 1928 – 2001) was a leader of Indian National Congress. He served as union minister of information and broadcasting during Rajeev Gandhi era.

== Details ==
He was a member of Lok Sabha elected from Pune. He was member of the Rajya Sabha from 1971 to 1980 and from 1994 to 2000 and of the Lok Sabha from 1980 to 1991. He was the chief spokesperson of the Congress under party presidents like Indira Gandhi, Rajiv Gandhi, Narasimha Rao and Sonia Gandhi. He was a senior advocate of the Supreme Court and honorary professor of economics in Ruparel College, Mumbai and professor of constitutional law in New Law College, Mumbai. He has written four books in Marathi: Trials of Great Man, Judicial Administration in India, Obscenity and the Law and International Law.

== Personal life ==
V N Gadgil's father, Narhar Vishnu Gadgil (also known as Kakasaheb Gadgil), was also a politician from Congress Party, and served in Jawaharlal Nehru's cabinet, and as Governor of Punjab. His son Anant Gadgil is an MLC and a National Media Panelist for the party.
