= Ramesh Gokhale =

Indian bridge player

Ramesh Gokhale (died September 30, 1988) was an Indian bridge player.

== Tournament wins ==
- Ruia Gold Cup (1981)
- Agarwala Pairs

Gokhale represented India in Valkenburg aan de Geul at the 1980 World Bridge Olympiad, and finished at 17th place. He was placed 39th (with partner Dr D. M. Dayal) in the finals of the 1978 World Open Pairs Championship.
