= Damoo Dhotre =

Indian animal trainer and circus performer (1902-1973)

- Born: Damodar Gangaram Dhotre; 31 August 1902; Pune, Maharashtra, India
- Died: 23 January 1973 (aged 70); Shukrawar Peth, Pune, Maharashtra, India
- Occupation: Animal trainer
- Employer(s): Ringling Bros. and Barnum & Bailey Circus (1940-1949)
- Known for: Animal training
- Awards: Circus Hall of Fame (1973)

Damoo Dhotre (31 August 1902 – 23 January 1973) was an Indian animal trainer and circus performer.

== Early life ==
Damodar Gangaram Dhotre was born on 31 August 1902, in Pune, Bombay Province (now Maharashtra), Colonial India.

== Circus life ==
Damoo Dhotre began visiting his maternal uncle Shellar's circus as a boy, and his uncle, recognizing his interest, took him under his wing. In 1912, he left school and traveled with his uncle for four years. He was nine when he began his own training, doing acrobatic work and bicycle training. He practiced acrobatics and cycling tricks on two wheels, high wheel, and unicycle under Savlaram Mali, the circus's star acrobat, who instructed and drilled him. Later, he set a record as a trick cyclist by jumping a 33-foot gap on a bicycle.

Right from the beginning, Damoo was more drawn to wild animals than to acrobatics. Dhotre, at age thirteen, sought out Dhondiram Chavan, the lead wild animal trainer of Shellar's Royal Circus, and started training to handle the animals himself. Damoo's mother was horrified at the idea of him entering a wild animal cage. With his uncle's circus, he learned professional approaches to animal training. The first trick he performed was riding a tiger around the ring. By the age of seventeen, he was "breaking" lions and tigers to perform.

Feeling homesick after four years, he returned to Pune.

With circuses like Great Olympia, Great Asiatic, Raymer's, Carson's American, and Franz Isako's Russian Circus, Damoo toured the Orient, including India, Burma, Ceylon, Indochina, Thailand, China, and the Malay States.

When the French circus artist Alfred Court visited India in 1939 for black leopards, Damoo Dhotre, their owner, demanded to go with them. From Calcutta, Dhotre journeyed to Paris to join Alfred Court as a trainer. He gained extensive knowledge of animals as a pupil of Court. His work at the French circus provided enough income to support his wife and three sons back in India.

With circuses disrupted amid World War II, the French circus company soon relocated to the United States. They were signed by John Ringling North, who traveled to Europe to recruit fresh acts before the supply was cut off.

For the 1940 season, Damoo Dhotre joined the Ringling Brothers and Barnum and Bailey Circus as one of the assistants of Alfred Court. Court's center ring big cat act, worked by Dhotre, debuted in the early 1940s and became a regular feature on the 1942 Ringling tour. He worked a cage filled with leopards, pumas, jaguars, panthers, and cheetahs, while the other two rings featured animals from polar bears to Great Danes. Damoo's mentor, Court, preferred to stay in the background, letting him lead the act. "Prince" Damoo Dhotre presented himself as a bare-chested fakir in a turban, baggy purple trousers, and glittering attire. His leopards, both close to 150 pounds, allowed him to wear them around his neck like fur stoles.

He continued to impress international audiences with his fearlessness and expertise. Unlike other trainers who provoked animals with guns, chairs, and whips, Damoo Dhotre relied on affection and voice cues. He began by calming fear, then taught respect. He stood by their cages for days, speaking and feeding them until they settled. During training, he relied on ropes, rewards, and gentle correction, certain fear alone caused resentment. With a guiding stick, a chew stick, and a whip to give signals, he stayed in command but always warned that no wild animal could be completely tamed.

From 1942 to 1945, Damoo was enlisted as a US Army corporal and spent time at Camp Sibert in Alabama. He served in the Special Services branch of the Army. During the war, he entertained servicemen, delivering lectures on wild animal training. At one point, his unit included Mickey Rooney, Red Skelton, Sabu, and Bobby Breen.

After three years, he rejoined the American circus scene when the war ended in 1945. He spent the season of 1946 as a featured act with Sparks Circus.

By 1947, he was again performing with the Ringling-Barnum show. During the 1949 program, Damoo Dhotre performed his act featuring six black and spotted leopards, two pumas, and four black jaguars. For several seasons, the Ringling-Barnum circus featured the mixed cat act in its center ring.

Dhotre resigned from Ringling Bros. and Barnum & Bailey Circus in 1949 due to an illness and headed back to Europe. Following recovery from a surgery, Dhotre rejoined the spotlight at Cirque Amar in France, opening an extended Paris engagement at Porte Maillot on 20 May 1950. The cats had been owned by Alfred Court, who had taken them to Ringling Brothers years before and sold them when he left for France. When Ringling disposed of the cats, Court bought them back, sold them to the Amars, and arranged for Dhotre to continue managing the act. He spent late 1950 performing across Africa and, by February 1951, was touring North Africa with Cirque Amar in Algeria, Tunisia, and Morocco.

Two years later, worsening health brought Dhotre back to his native India. He spent his final years residing in Shukrawar Peth, Pune.

== Death ==
Damoo Gangaram Dhotre died in Pune, Maharashtra, India, on 23 January 1973.

== Legacy ==
He recounted his story to Richard Taplinger in Wild Animal Man, published in 1961. The autobiography documents the trainer's career highlights and experiences in the circus.

The Circus World Museum received several items from Dhotre in December 1963.

Damoo Dhotre was inducted into the International Circus Hall of Fame in 1973.
