= Shivrampant Damle =

Indian educationist

Governor of the Maharashtra Mandal
- In office 1930–1942
- In office 1951–1975
- Succeeded by: Ramesh Damle

Secretary of the Maharashtra Mandal
- In office 1924–1930

Founder of the Maharashtra Mandal

Personal details
- Born: 14 April 1900 Maval
- Died: 25 July 1977 (aged 77) Pune
- Spouse: Kamlabai Bapat (died 1968)
- Children: 2
- Parent(s): Vishnu Damle (father) and Lakshmi Damle (mother)
- Education: Bachelor of Arts
- Alma mater: Sir Parshurambhau College
- Occupation: Educationist

Military service
- Allegiance: British India (before 1947), India (after 1947)
- Years of service: 1942–1948
- Rank: Captain
- Unit: Belgaum
- Battles/wars: World War II

Captain Shivrampant Damle (14 April 1900, in Maval – 25 July 1977, in Pune) was an Indian educationist. He is best remembered for founding the Maharashtriya Mandal in 1924.

== Biography ==
Damle was born on 14 April 1900, to Vishnu (d. 1928) and Lakshmi (née Chimnatai Modak; d. 1934) of the Damle gharana of Kivale. He was one of eight children born to his parents; he had six brothers and one sister. His family was Chitpavan brahmin.

Damle was educated at the Nutan Marathi Vidyalaya in Pune. He graduated with a B. A. degree from Sir Parshurambhau College before going on to found the Maharashtra Mandal in 1924, serving as its first secretary. Beginning in 1930, he served as the governor of the Maharashtra Mandal.

From 1942 to 1948, he joined the British Indian Army. During World War II, he was posted in Belgaum. From 1951 to 1975 he again took up governorship of the Mandal.

Beginning in 1963, he founded the Seth Dagduram Kataria High School, founding the Indirabai Karandikar Primary School on Tilak road in Pune in 1964, and founding schools for primary education in Marathi in 1968 and 1970, focusing on women's education.

On 1 July 1977, he founded the Chandrashekhar Agashe College of Physical Education in Gultekdi, Pune, having begun work for its founding in 1938.

Damle married Kamlabai Bapat, who predeceased him in 1968. The couple had two children, a son named Ramesh (b. 1935) and a daughter named Sunanda (b. 1937). Damle died on 25 July 1977, with his son succeeding him as governor of the Mandal.
