= Vineet Alurkar =

Indian musician and singer-songwriter

- Occupations: Musician, Teacher , Author, Singer-Songwriter
- Parent(s): Suresh Alurkar (father) and Anuradha Alurkar (mother)
- Musical career
- Genres: Folk, rock, fusion
- Instruments: Guitar, bass, piano, drums, vocals
- Website: yogalogik.com

Vineet Alurkar is an Indian musician, singer-songwriter and author from Pune, India. He is most noteworthy as the frontman of bands The Black Birds and Yoga Logik.

== Biography ==
Alurkar was born to music entrepreneur Suresh Alurkar and wife Anuradha Alurkar. Alurkar's father was known in music circles across India for his vast collection of rare classics and was the owner of Alurkar Music House. Alurkar's father was found murdered in his Pune home in 2008. Alurkar has one brother and is married as of 2016.

Alurkar conceived of the Austrian-Indian folk rock 6 member band, Yoga Logik in 2005 when he jammed with Austrian guitarist Wolfgang Sambs during Sambs' visit to India. The band's music is inspired by lyrical poetry. Critics have appreciated its blend of contemporary jazz and funk clubbed with Indian classical styles of music. The band have extensively toured Europe and India from 2012 to 2016. The band released their 2nd album titled Live at Vidya Valley in 2014.They released their 3rd album in 2016 which was recorded in Frogmountain Records, Austria

Alurkar was also one of the founding members of the band The Black Birds in 2003. The band began as a school reunion between Alurkar and fellow musician Dhruv Bhate. The band released an EP that same year.

As of 2016, Alurkar has been performing over 13 years in India and around the globe. Alurkar plays the guitar as his favored instrument and runs his music teaching practice from Bavdhan (Studio YogaLogik) https://goo.gl/maps/yHH6gH3BqC9wYpR79 in Pune. He is a permanent musical faculty with the Pune based Vidya Valley School and is visiting faculty in Rungsted Gymnasium, a high school in Copenhagen, Denmark.

Alurkar has conducted music workshops in Skoloa Slunovat in Brno, Czech Republic, Stifter Music Schule, Linz,Austria and other schools in Austria and Belgium.

Alurkar along with Dhruv Bhate co-authored and released a book called "Rock n Roll Dreams Indian Reality" in December 2025.This is India's 1st Rock n Roll Memoir.
