= P. N. Gadgil Jewellers =

Indian jewellery company founded in 1832

- Formerly: Purshottam Narayan Gadgil Jewellers
- Type: Public
- Traded as: NSE: PNGJL; BSE: 544256
- Industry: Jewellery
- Founded: 29 November 1832; 193 years ago
- Founder: Ganesh Gadgil
- Headquarters: Pune, India
- Number of locations: 53 showrooms
- Area served: Worldwide
- Key people: Saurabh Gadgil (chairman & MD)
- Revenue: ▲₹76,934.68 (US$800) (FY 2024–25)
- Net income: ▲₹2,182.68 (US$23) (FY 2024–25)
- Owner: Gadgil family (83%)
- Number of employees: 2,100+
- Subsidiaries: Gadgil Diamonds Private Limited, India; PNG Jewelers, Inc., USA
- Website: www.pngjewellers.com

P. N. Gadgil Jewellers Limited, also known as Purshottam Narayan Gadgil Jewellers, is an Indian jewellery company founded by Ganesh Gadgil in Sangli in 1832. It is one of the oldest jewellery companies in India, known for its production of jewellery distinctive to the Maharashtra. As of 2025, the company is headquartered in Pune and operates 53 retail stores, including 52 in Maharashtra and Goa and one in California, US.

== History ==
=== Early years (1832–1890) ===
The company was founded as Gadgil Jewellers on 29 November 1832 by Ganesh Gadgil in Sangli. In its early years, the business operated without a permanent storefront and was initially run from a pavement in a busy part of the city. In 1860, Gadgil relocated the business to a waada (traditional residence) he had purchased in Sangli. Under Gadgil's father, the family had previously served as savakars to the Kolhatkar and Modak families of the Princely state of Sangli, and were thus accorded the office of royal jeweller to the Patwardhan kings of the State after the establishment of their jewellery business.

=== 1890–1958 ===
Although Gadgil intended all three of his sons to participate in the business, it was eventually continued by his middle son Narayan Gadgil. His other sons, Ramchandra and Gopal, pursued careers in moneylending and law, respectively. In 1874, Ganesh Gadgil renamed the business P. N. Gadgil Jewellers after his grandson, Purshottam Narayan Gadgil.

Following Ganesh Gadgil’s death in 1890, Narayan Gadgil and his sons managed the company. After Narayan’s death in 1920, management passed to Purshottam Gadgil and his brothers, Ganesh Gadgil II and Vasudev Gadgil. Upon Purshottam’s death in 1954, the business continued under the leadership of the extended family’s next generation.

=== Expansion to Pune (1958–2012) ===
In 1938, Anant Gadgil, the younger son of Ganesh Gadgil II, joined the family business and worked at the Sangli store for nearly two decades. In 1958, he and his cousin, the son of Vishwanath Gadgil, established a new retail outlet in Pune under the name P. N. Gadgil Jewellers & Company, located on Laxmi Road. This marked the beginning of operations in two locations under the same brand. The Pune branch was managed by Anant, Vishwanath Gadgil, and Laxman Gadgil, while the Sangli branch was overseen by Hari, the son of Vasudev Gadgil, and Shankar, Anant’s elder brother. Following the death of Vasudev Gadgil in 1965, the Sangli branch continued under the management of his descendants.

=== Formal separation and IPO (2012–present) ===
In 2012, the Pune and Sangli branches formally separated, with the Pune operations continuing under the name P. N. Gadgil & Company. After Anant Gadgil's death in 2014, his son and grandson, including Saurabh Gadgil, inherited a portion of the business. Saurabh Gadgil, who had joined the company in 2000, later became its chairman and managing director. During his tenure, the company was restructured as a corporate entity. In September 2024, the company held an IPO that raised approximately ₹1,100 crore. It was subsequently listed on the Bombay Stock Exchange and the National Stock Exchange. Following the IPO, the Gadgil family retained a majority ownership stake in the firm.

== Operations ==
PNG Jewellers uses a combination of company-owned and franchise-operated stores. In 2014, PNG Jewellers established a diamond manufacturing unit in Mumbai.

As of 2025, PNG Jewellers operated 53 outlets, including 52 stores across 21 cities in Maharashtra and Goa, and one store in the United States. Of the total, 41 stores were company-owned, while 12 operated under the FOCO model.
