= 2017 Pune Municipal Corporation election =

Local elections in Maharashtra

- 21 February 2017

All 162 seats in Pune Municipal Corporation 82 seats needed for a majority

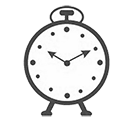

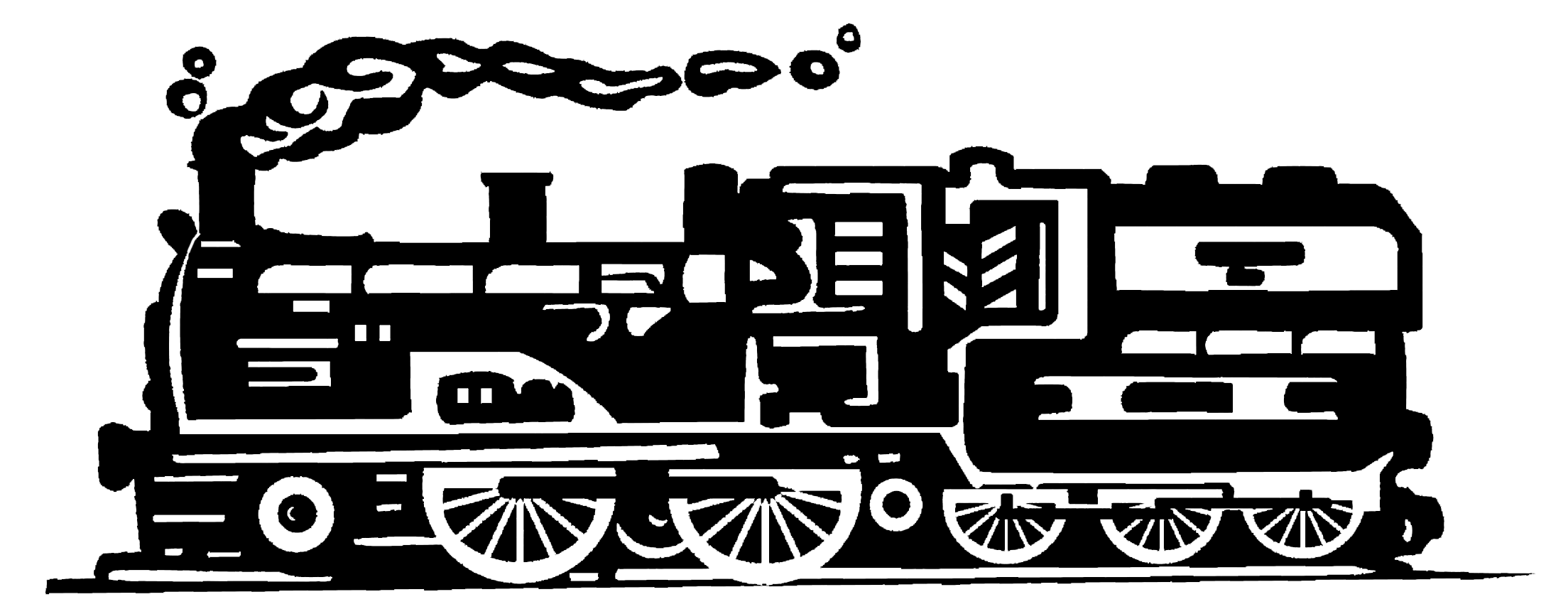

	First party	Second party	Third party
Party	BJP	INC	NCP
Last election	26	28	51
Seats won	97	09	39
Seat change	▲71	▼19	▼12
	Fourth party	Fifth party	Sixth party
Party	SS	MNS	AIMIM
Last election	15	29	00
Seats won	10	02	01
Seat change	▼5	▼27	▲01
	Seventh party
Party	Independent
Last election	01
Seats won	04
Seat change	▲3

The election to the 2017 Pune Municipal Corporation was held from 27 January to 23 February 2017. This election saw a voter turnout of 55.52% election. On 15 March 2017, BJP's Mukta Tilak and RPI(A)' s Navnath Kamble were respectively elected as the mayor and deputy mayor

== Background ==
As many as 1,090 candidates were in the fray for the 162 seats of 2017 PMC election which has with a total electorate of about 26.34 lakh.

== Schedule ==
Pune Municipal Corporation 2017 Election Program was 27 January to 23 February 2017.

Poll Event	Schedule
Notification date	27 January 2017
Last date for filing out nominations	3 February 2017
Scrutiny of nominations	6 February 2017
Last date for withdrawal of Candidature	7 February 2017
Date of Poll	21 February 2017
Counting of Votes	23 February 2017

== Election results ==
The results of the election were counted and declared on 23 February 2017.

Pune Municipal Corporation
Party	Seats won	Seats +/−	Votes	Vote %
Nationalist Congress Party	39	▼12	1,273,524	21.94%
Maharashtra Navnirman Sena	02	▼27	373,645	6.44%
Indian National Congress	09	▼19	500,980	8.63%
Bharatiya Janata Party	97	▲71	2,128,452	36.67%
Shiv Sena	10	▼05	823,744	14.19%
All India Majlis-e-Ittehadul Muslimeen	01	▲00	73,274	1.26%
Independents	04	▲03	459,435	7.91%
None of the Above	0	±0	171,581	2.96%
Total	162	±0	5,804,635	100%
Turnout				55.56%
Source: Pune Civic Electoral Department

=== Results by Ward Wise ===
The election results for all 162 seats were declared on 23 February 2017

Ward Number	Ward Name	Seat	Name	Party
01	Kalas - Dhanori	A	Kiran Nilesh Jathar	Bharatiya Janata Party
01	Kalas - Dhanori	B	Maruti Sangade	Bharatiya Janata Party
01	Kalas - Dhanori	C	Rekha Chandrakant Tingare	Nationalist Congress Party
01	Kalas - Dhanori	D	Anil Vasantrao Tingare	Bharatiya Janata Party
02	Nagpur Chawl - Phule Nagar	A	Siddharth Yashvant Dhende	Bharatiya Janata Party
02	Nagpur Chawl - Phule Nagar	B	Farjhana Mehbub Shekh	Bharatiya Janata Party
02	Nagpur Chawl - Phule Nagar	C	Sheetal Ajay Sawant	Bharatiya Janata Party
02	Nagpur Chawl - Phule Nagar	D	Sunil Vijay Tingare	Nationalist Congress Party
03	Viman Nagar - Somnath Nagar	A	Rahul Kondiram Bhandare	Bharatiya Janata Party
03	Viman Nagar - Somnath Nagar	B	Shweta Khose - Galande	Bharatiya Janata Party
03	Viman Nagar - Somnath Nagar	C	Mukta Arjun Jagtap	Bharatiya Janata Party
03	Viman Nagar - Somnath Nagar	D	Bapuraav Gangaram Karne Guruji	Bharatiya Janata Party
04	Kharadi - Chandan Nagar	A	Bhaiyyaasaahe Tukaam Jadhav	Nationalist Congress Party
04	Kharadi - Chandan Nagar	B	Suman Balasaheb Pathar	Nationalist Congress Party
04	Kharadi - Chandan Nagar	C	Sanjila Bapusaheb Pathare	Nationalist Congress Party
04	Kharadi - Chandan Nagar	D	Mahendra Pandharinath Pathare	Nationalist Congress Party
05	Vadagaon Sheri - Kalyani Nagar	A	Sunita Maruti Galande	Bharatiya Janata Party
05	Vadagaon Sheri - Kalyani Nagar	B	Shital Dnyaneshwar Shinde	Bharatiya Janata Party
05	Vadagaon Sheri - Kalyani Nagar	C	Yogsh Tukaram Mulik	Bharatiya Janata Party
05	Vadagaon Sheri - Kalyani Nagar	D	Sandip Namdev Jarhad	Bharatiya Janata Party
06	Yerawada	A	Avinash Raj Salve	Shiv Sena
06	Yerawada	B	Shweta Anil Chavan	Shiv Sena
06	Yerawada	C	Ashvini Daniyal Landge	AIMIM
06	Yerawada	D	Sanjay Shashikant Bhosale	Shiv Sena
07	Pune University - Wakadewadi	A	Sonali Santosh Landge	Bharatiya Janata Party
07	Pune University - Wakadewadi	B	Rajeshree Dnyaaneshwar Kale	Bharatiya Janata Party
07	Pune University - Wakadewadi	C	Rajeshree Dnyaaneshwar Kale	Bharatiya Janata Party
07	Pune University - Wakadewadi	D	Reshma Anil Bhosale	Independent
08	Aundh - Bopodi	A	Sunita Parshuram Wadekar	Bharatiya Janata Party
08	Aundh - Bopodi	B	Archana Madhukar Musale	Bharatiya Janata Party
08	Aundh - Bopodi	C	Vijay Baburao Shewale	Bharatiya Janata Party
08	Aundh - Bopodi	D	Prakash (Bandu) Dnyanoba Dhore	Bharatiya Janata Party
09	Baner - Balewadi - Pashan	A	Swapnali Pralhad Saykar	Bharatiya Janata Party
09	Baner - Balewadi - Pashan	B	Jyoti Ganesh Kalamkar	Bharatiya Janata Party
09	Baner - Balewadi - Pashan	C	Amol Ratan Balwadkar	Bharatiya Janata Party
09	Baner - Balewadi - Pashan	D	Baburao Dattoba Chandore	Nationalist Congress Party
10	Bavdhan - Kothrud Depo	A	Kiran Dagde Patil	Bharatiya Janata Party
10	Bavdhan - Kothrud Depo	B	Shraddha Ashok Prabhune - Pathak	Bharatiya Janata Party
10	Bavdhan - Kothrud Depo	C	Alpana Ganesh Varpe	Bharatiya Janata Party
10	Bavdhan - Kothrud Depo	D	Dilip WedePatil	Bharatiya Janata Party
11	Rambaug Colony - Shiv Tirtha Nagar	A	Dipak Mankar	Nationalist Congress Party
11	Rambaug Colony - Shiv Tirtha Nagar	B	Chaya Ajay Marane	Bharatiya Janata Party
11	Rambaug Colony - Shiv Tirtha Nagar	C	Vaishali Rajendra Marathe	Indian National Congress
11	Rambaug Colony - Shiv Tirtha Nagar	D	Ramchandra (Chanduseth) Atmaram Kadam	Indian National Congress
12	Mayur Colony - Dahanukar Colony	A	Harshali Dinesh Mathawad	Bharatiya Janata Party
12	Mayur Colony - Dahanukar Colony	B	Vasanti Navnath Jadhav	Bharatiya Janata Party
12	Mayur Colony - Dahanukar Colony	C	Murlidhar Mohol	Bharatiya Janata Party
12	Mayur Colony - Dahanukar Colony	D	Pruthveeraj Shashikant Sutar	Shiv Sena
13	Erandwana - Happy Colony	A	Dipak Pote	Bharatiya Janata Party
13	Erandwana - Happy Colony	B	Madhuri Shriram Sahastrabuddhe	Bharatiya Janata Party
13	Erandwana - Happy Colony	C	Manjushree Sandeep Khardekar	Bharatiya Janata Party
13	Erandwana - Happy Colony	D	Jayant Govind Bhave	Bharatiya Janata Party
14	Deccan Gymkhana - Model Colony	A	Swati Ashok Lokhande	Bharatiya Janata Party
14	Deccan Gymkhana - Model Colony	B	Nilima Dattatray Khade	Bharatiya Janata Party
14	Deccan Gymkhana - Model Colony	C	Jotsna Gajanan Ekbote	Bharatiya Janata Party
14	Deccan Gymkhana - Model Colony	D	Siddharth Padmakar (Anil) Shirole	Bharatiya Janata Party
15	Shanivar Peth - Sadashiv Peth	A	Hemant Rasane	Bharatiya Janata Party
15	Shanivar Peth - Sadashiv Peth	B	Gayatri Ratnadeep Khadake- Suryavanshi	Bharatiya Janata Party
15	Shanivar Peth - Sadashiv Peth	C	Mukta Shailesh Tilak	Bharatiya Janata Party
15	Shanivar Peth - Sadashiv Peth	D	Rajesh Tukaram Yenpure	Bharatiya Janata Party
16	Kasba Peth - Somwar Peth	A	Pallavi Chandrashekha Jawale	Shiv Sena
16	Kasba Peth - Somwar Peth	B	Rajendra Hemraj Dhangekar	Independent
16	Kasba Peth - Somwar Peth	C	Sujata Sadanand Shettee	Indian National Congress
16	Kasba Peth - Somwar Peth	D	Yogesh Dattatray Samel	Bharatiya Janata Party
17	Rasta Peth - Raviwar Peth	A	Laxmi Udaykant Andekar	Nationalist Congress Party
17	Rasta Peth - Raviwar Peth	B	Sulochana Tejendra Kondhare	Bharatiya Janata Party
17	Rasta Peth - Raviwar Peth	C	Vanraj Suryakant Andekar	Nationalist Congress Party
17	Rasta Peth - Raviwar Peth	D	Vishal Gorakh Dhanavade	Shiv Sena
18	Khadakmal Aali - Mahatma Phule Peth	A	Vijayalaxmi Motilal Harihar	Bharatiya Janata Party
18	Khadakmal Aali - Mahatma Phule Peth	B	Arti Sachin Kondhare	Bharatiya Janata Party
18	Khadakmal Aali - Mahatma Phule Peth	C	Ajay Pandurang Khedekar	Bharatiya Janata Party
18	Khadakmal Aali - Mahatma Phule Peth	D	Samrat Abhay Thorat	Bharatiya Janata Party
19	Lohiya Nagar - Kasewadi	A	Avinash Ramesh Bagwe	Indian National Congress
19	Lohiya Nagar - Kasewadi	B	Manisha Sandeep Ladkat	Bharatiya Janata Party
19	Lohiya Nagar - Kasewadi	C	Archana Tushar Patil	Bharatiya Janata Party
19	Lohiya Nagar - Kasewadi	D	Rafik Abdul Rahim Shekh	Indian National Congress
20	Tadiwala Road - Sasoon Hospital	A	Pradip Machindra Gayakwad	Nationalist Congress Party
20	Tadiwala Road - Sasoon Hospital	B	Chandbi Haji Nadaf	Indian National Congress
20	Tadiwala Road - Sasoon Hospital	C	Latabai Dayaram Rajguru	Indian National Congress
20	Tadiwala Road - Sasoon Hospital	D	Arvind Shinde	Indian National Congress
21	Koregaon Park - Ghorpadi	A	Navnath Viththal Kamble	Bharatiya Janata Party
21	Koregaon Park - Ghorpadi	B	Lata Vishnu Dhayakar	Bharatiya Janata Party
21	Koregaon Park - Ghorpadi	C	Mangala Prakash Mantri	Bharatiya Janata Party
21	Koregaon Park - Ghorpadi	D	Umesh Dnyeshwar Gayakwad	Bharatiya Janata Party
22	Magarpatta City	A	Chetan Viththal Tupe	Nationalist Congress Party
22	Magarpatta City	B	Hemlata Nilesh Magar	Nationalist Congress Party
22	Magarpatta City	C	Chanchala Sandip Kondre	Nationalist Congress Party
22	Magarpatta City	D	Sunil Jaywant Gayakwad	Nationalist Congress Party
23	Hadapsar Gaothan - Satavwadi	A	Yogesh Dattatray Sasane	Nationalist Congress Party
23	Hadapsar Gaothan - Satavwadi	B	Vrushali Sunil Bankar	Nationalist Congress Party
23	Hadapsar Gaothan - Satavwadi	C	Ujwala Subhash Jangale	Bharatiya Janata Party
23	Hadapsar Gaothan - Satavwadi	D	Maruti Shivaji Tupe	Bharatiya Janata Party
24	Ramtekadi Sayyad Nagar	A	Ashok Dhaku Kamble	Independents
24	Ramtekadi Sayyad Nagar	B	Ruksana Shamsuddin Inamdar	Independents
24	Ramtekadi Sayyad Nagar	C	Anand Anna Alkunte (NCP)	Nationalist Congress Party
25	Wanwadi	A	Dhanraj Baburao Ghogare	Bharatiya Janata Party
25	Wanwadi	B	Kalindi Muralidhar Punde	Bharatiya Janata Party
25	Wanwadi	C	Ratnaprabha Sudam Jagtap	Nationalist Congress Party
25	Wanwadi	D	Prashant Sudam Jagtap	Nationalist Congress Party
26	Mohammadwadi - Kausar Baug	A	Prachi Ashish alhaat	Shiv Sena
26	Mohammadwadi - Kausar Baug	B	Pramod Vasant Bhangire	Shiv Sena
26	Mohammadwadi - Kausar Baug	C	Nanda Narayan Lonkar	Nationalist Congress Party
26	Mohammadwadi - Kausar Baug	D	Sanjay (Tatya) Gulab Ghule	Bharatiya Janata Party
27	Kondhwa Khurda - Meetha Nagar	A	Haji Gafur Pathan	Nationalist Congress Party
27	Kondhwa Khurda - Meetha Nagar	B	Parvin Haji Firoj	Nationalist Congress Party
27	Kondhwa Khurda - Meetha Nagar	C	Hamida Anis Sundke	Nationalist Congress Party
27	Kondhwa Khurda - Meetha Nagar	D	Sainath Sambhaji Babar	Maharashtra Navnirman Sena
28	Salisbury Park - Maharshi Nagar	A	Kavita Bharat Vairage	Bharatiya Janata Party
28	Salisbury Park - Maharshi Nagar	B	Shrinath Vasant Bhimale	Bharatiya Janata Party
28	Salisbury Park - Maharshi Nagar	C	Rajashree Avinash Shilimkar	Bharatiya Janata Party
28	Salisbury Park - Maharshi Nagar	D	Pravin Manikchand Chorbele	Bharatiya Janata Party
29	Navi Peth - Parvati	A	Saraswati Kishor Shendge	Bharatiya Janata Party
29	Navi Peth - Parvati	B	Mahesh Namdev Lakat	Bharatiya Janata Party
29	Navi Peth - Parvati	C	Smita Padmakar Vaste	Bharatiya Janata Party
29	Navi Peth - Parvati	D	Dhiraj Ramchandra Ghate	Bharatiya Janata Party
30	Janata Vasahat - Dattawadi	A	Anand Ramesh Rithe	Bharatiya Janata Party
30	Janata Vasahat - Dattawadi	B	Priya Shivaji Gadade	Nationalist Congress Party
30	Janata Vasahat - Dattawadi	C	Anita Santosh Kadam	Bharatiya Janata Party
30	Janata Vasahat - Dattawadi	D	Shankar Ganpat Pawar	Bharatiya Janata Party
31	Karve Nagar	A	Sushil Shivram Mengade	Bharatiya Janata Party
31	Karve Nagar	B	Laxmi Devram Dhudhane	Nationalist Congress Party
31	Karve Nagar	C	Vrushali Dattatray Chaudhari	Bharatiya Janata Party
31	Karve Nagar	D	Rajabhau Kisan Barate	Bharatiya Janata Party
32	Warje - Malwadi	A	Dilip Prabhakar Barate	Nationalist Congress Party
32	Warje - Malwadi	B	Sayali Ramesh Vanjale	Nationalist Congress Party
32	Warje - Malwadi	C	Dipali Pradip Dhumal	Nationalist Congress Party
32	Warje - Malwadi	D	Sachin Shivaji Dodake	Nationalist Congress Party
33	Vadgaon Dhayari - Suncity	A	Haridas Krushna Charwad	Bharatiya Janata Party
33	Vadgaon Dhayari - Suncity	B	Hema (Rajashri) Dilip Nawale	Bharatiya Janata Party
33	Vadgaon Dhayari - Suncity	C	Nita Anant Dangat	Bharatiya Janata Party
33	Vadgaon Dhayari - Suncity	D	Raju Murlidhar Laygude	Bharatiya Janata Party
34	Vadgaon Budruk - Hingane Khurd	A	Prasanna Ghanashyam Jagtap	Bharatiya Janata Party
34	Vadgaon Budruk - Hingane Khurd	B	Jyoti Kishor Gosavi	Bharatiya Janata Party
34	Vadgaon Budruk - Hingane Khurd	C	Manjusha Dipak Nagpure	Bharatiya Janata Party
34	Vadgaon Budruk - Hingane Khurd	D	Shrikant Shashikant Jagtap	Bharatiya Janata Party
35	Sahakar Nagar - Padmavati	A	Saidisha Rahul Mane	Bharatiya Janata Party
35	Sahakar Nagar - Padmavati	B	Ulhaas Vasantrao Bagul	Indian National Congress
35	Sahakar Nagar - Padmavati	C	Ashwini Nitin Kadam	Nationalist Congress Party
35	Sahakar Nagar - Padmavati	D	Mahesh Narsing Wabale	Bharatiya Janata Party
36	Marketyard - Lower Indira Nagar	A	Anusuya Abhiman Chavan	Bharatiya Janata Party
36	Marketyard - Lower Indira Nagar	B	Rajendra Yashwant Shilimkar	Bharatiya Janata Party
36	Marketyard - Lower Indira Nagar	C	Masnasi Manoj Deshpande	Bharatiya Janata Party
36	Marketyard - Lower Indira Nagar	D	Sunil Dnyandev Kamble	Bharatiya Janata Party
37	Upper Super Indira Nagar	A	Varsha Bhima Sathe	Bharatiya Janata Party
37	Upper Super Indira Nagar	B	Rupali Dinesh Dhadawe	Bharatiya Janata Party
37	Upper Super Indira Nagar	C	Bala (Pramod) Oswal	Shiv Sena
38	Gandhi Gardan - Balaji Nagar	A	Dattatray Babanrao Dhankwade	Nationalist Congress Party
38	Gandhi Gardan - Balaji Nagar	B	Rani Rayba Bhosale	Bharatiya Janata Party
38	Gandhi Gardan - Balaji Nagar	C	Manisha Rajabhau Kadam	Bharatiya Janata Party
38	Gandhi Gardan - Balaji Nagar	D	Prakash Viththalrao Kadam	Nationalist Congress Party
39	Dhankavadi - Ambegaon Pathar	A	Bala (Kishor) Uttam Dhankawade	Nationalist Congress Party
39	Dhankavadi - Ambegaon Pathar	B	Ashwini Sagr Bahgwat	Nationalist Congress Party
39	Dhankavadi - Ambegaon Pathar	C	Varsha Vilas Tapkir	Bharatiya Janata Party
39	Dhankavadi - Ambegaon Pathar	D	Vishal Vilas Tambe	Nationalist Congress Party
40	Ambegaon Dattanagar - Katraj Gaonthan	A	Yuwaraj Sambhaji Beldare	Nationalist Congress Party
40	Ambegaon Dattanagar - Katraj Gaonthan	B	Amruta Ajit Babar	Nationalist Congress Party
40	Ambegaon Dattanagar - Katraj Gaonthan	C	Smita Sudhir Kondhare	Nationalist Congress Party
40	Ambegaon Dattanagar - Katraj Gaonthan	D	Vasant Krushna More	Maharashtra Navnirman Sena
41	Kondhwa Budruk – Yewalewadi	A	Virsen Bapu Jagtap	Bharatiya Janata Party
41	Kondhwa Budruk – Yewalewadi	B	Sangita Rajendra Thosar	Shiv Sena
41	Kondhwa Budruk – Yewalewadi	C	Vrushali Sunil Kamthe	Bharatiya Janata Party
41	Kondhwa Budruk – Yewalewadi	D	Ranjan Pundalik Tilekar	Bharatiya Janata Party
