= Dattatraya =

Dattatraya or Dattatray is a given name and a surname. Notable people with the name include:

- Dattatraya Damodar Dabke, actor in the first ever Indian full length silent film Raja Harishchandra
- Bandaru Dattatraya, (born 1947), Indian politician, Governor of the State of Haryana
- Madhukar Dattatraya Deoras (1915–1996), the third Sarsanghchalak of the Rashtriya Swayamsevak Sangh
- Dattatraya Ekbote (1936–2020), Indian workers' rights activist, politician and former Mayor of Pune
- Dattatraya Ganesh Godse (1914–1992), Indian historian, playwright, art critic, art director, illustrator
- Shankar Dattatraya Javdekar (1894–1955), Marathi writer from Maharashtra, India
- Dattatraya Shridhar Joshi (born 1908), Indian Civil Servant of 1933 batch
- Sanjay Dattatraya Kakade (born 1967), Member of Parliament representing Maharashtra in the Rajya Sabha
- Dattatraya Bhikaji Kulkarni (1934–2016), Marathi writer, critic, retired university professor
- Sameer Dattatraya Meghe (born 1978), member of the 13th Maharashtra Legislative Assembly
- Dattatraya Naik (1890–1968), Indian cricket umpire
- Dattatraya Yeshwant Phadke, head of Electronics division at Tata Institute of Fundamental Research
- Dattatraya Rane, leader of Bharatiya Janata Party
- Dattatraya C. Patil Revoor, Indian politician, president of Kalyana-Karnataka Region Development Board
- Rajaram Dattatraya Thakur (1923–1975), Indian film director in the Marathi film industry
- Dattatray Vithoba Bharne, aka Datta Mama Bharne, Indian politician
- Dattatray Ramachandra Bhat, aka Datta Bhat, Indian film and theatre actor in Hindi and Marathi
- Dattatray Deshpande (1925–1970), Indian freedom fighter
- Dattatray Dhankawade, Indian politician, Mayor of Pune
- Shivram Dattatray Joshi (1926–2013), Indian Sanskrit scholar and grammarian
- Girish Dattatray Mahajan, politician from Jalgaon district of Maharashtra
- Dattatray Raghobaji Meghe (born 1936), Indian politician
- Bhalchandra Dattatray Mondhe (born 1944), Indian photographer, sculptor and painter
- Dattatray Padsalgikar (born 1958), Indian Police Service officer, Deputy National Security Advisor of India
- Dattatray Balwant Parasnis (1870–1926), Indian historian
- Dattatray Patil, Indian politician
- Abhimanyu Dattatray Pawar, Indian politician from the Bharatiya Janata Party
- Dattatray Potdar (1890–1979), aka Datto Vaman Potdar, Indian historian, writer, and orator
- Ramachandra Dattatray Pradhan (1928–2020), Indian Administrative Service officer
- Dattatraya Balkrishna Limaye, Indian chemist

== See also ==
- Dattatreya
