= Ravindra Dhangekar =

Indian politician

Member of Maharashtra Legislative Assembly
- In office 2 March 2023 – 26 November 2024
- Preceded by: Mukta Tilak
- Succeeded by: Hemant Rasane
- Constituency: Kasba Peth

Personal details
- Party: Shiv Sena (10 March 2025-Present)
- Other political affiliations: Indian National Congress (2017-2025); Maharashtra Navnirman Sena (2006-2017); Shiv Sena (1997-2006)

Ravindra Hemraj Dhangekar is an Indian politician from Pune, who previously served as a member of the Maharashtra Legislative Assembly from the Kasba Peth Assembly constituency. He won the seat in a by-election in March 2023, which was necessitated by the death of the incumbent BJP MLA Mukta Tilak. Dhangekar's victory on a Congress ticket was seen as a significant upset, ending the BJP's 28-year hold on the constituency. However, he lost the assembly elections from Kasba Peth to a BJP candidate the following year.

Following his victory in the by-election, Dhangekar was chosen as the Indian National Congress candidate for the Pune Lok Sabha constituency in the 2024 general elections. He competed against Murlidhar Mohol of the BJP but was not successful.On 10 March 2025, He quit Indian National Congress and joined the Shiv Sena.

== Early life ==
Ravindra Hemraj Dhangekar was born in Pune, Maharashtra. He completed his education up to the 8th standard at Motoba School in Nathachiwadi, Daund, Pune, in 1985. Dhangekar hails from the OBC community, which constitutes a significant portion of the population in the Kasba Peth constituency.

== Political career ==
Dhangekar's political career has seen several transitions across different parties.

Political Affiliations
Year	Party	Symbol
1997–2006	Shiv Sena	
2006–2017	Maharashtra Navnirman Sena	
2017–2025	Indian National Congress	
10 March 2025 – Present	Shiv Sena	

=== Early Years with Shiv Sena ===
Ravindra Dhangekar's political journey began with the Shiv Sena. He was inspired by the speeches of Shiv Sena founder Balasaheb Thackeray and entered politics under the mentorship of senior Shiv Sena leader Deepak Paigude. Dhangekar was first elected as a corporator in the Pune Municipal Corporation in 1997.

=== Transition to Maharashtra Navnirman Sena ===
In 2006, when Raj Thackeray split from the Shiv Sena to form the Maharashtra Navnirman Sena (MNS), Dhangekar, along with Paigude, joined the new party. As an MNS candidate in the 2009 Maharashtra Assembly elections, he contested from the Kasba Peth constituency and gave a tough fight to the BJP's Girish Bapat, losing by a margin of around 8,000 votes. Dhangekar contested the 2014 Assembly elections from Kasba Peth again on an MNS ticket but lost amid the Modi wave.

=== Brief independent candidature and joining congress ===
Feeling sidelined within the MNS, Dhangekar quit the party in 2017 and briefly contested as an independent in the Pune civic polls with Congress support, defeating BJP heavyweight Ganesh Bidkar. Later in 2017, he officially joined the Indian National Congress party. He aimed to contest the 2019 Assembly elections from Kasba Peth, but the Congress fielded Arvind Shinde instead, leading to a BJP win by Mukta Tilak.

=== 2023 by-election victory ===
Dhangekar's significant achievement came in 2023 when he won the Kasba Peth Assembly by-election on a Congress ticket, ending the BJP's 28-year stronghold in the constituency. His victory was considered a significant upset for the BJP.

=== 2024 General Elections ===
Following his by-election win, the Congress named Dhangekar as its candidate from the Pune Lok Sabha constituency for the 2024 general elections. However, he lost to the BJP's Murlidhar Mohol in the Lok Sabha polls.

=== 2024 Maharashtra Legislative Assembly Election ===
Following his 1 and half year tenure as MLA, he contested the 2024 Maharashtra Legislative Assembly election from Kasba Peth on a Congress ticket but lost to BJP candidate Hemant Rasane.
