= List of mayors of Pune =

Mayor of Punekar
- Incumbent; Manjusha Nagpure
- Style: Honorable Mayor
- Appointer: Chief Minister
- Term length: 2.5 years
- Formation: 1952; 74 years ago
- First holder: Baburao Sanas
- Website: https://pmc.gov.in/mr

The Mayor of Pune is the first citizen of the Indian city of Pune. The mayor is the chief of the Pune Municipal Corporation. The mayor’s role is largely ceremonial as the real powers are vested in the Municipal Commissioner.

The mayor is elected from within the ranks of the council in a quinquennial election. The elections are conducted in all 76 regions in the city to elect corporators. The Mayor is generally the leader of a party (or coalition of parties) that has a majority. Currently, the mayor is Manjusha Nagpure of the Bharatiya Janata Party.

== List ==
| Sr.no | Mayor | Term | Political Party |
|---|---|---|---|
| 2 | Shankarrao Dasharathrao Ursal | 1952 | INC |
| 3 | Bhausaheb Shirole | 1957 | INC |
| 4 | Rambhau Telang | 1958–1959 | INC |
| 5 | Narayan Ganesh Gore | 1967–1968 | INC |
| 6 | Namdeorao Ramkrishna Mate Bhausaheb Sonba Anaji Chavan | 1970/1971, 1971–1972 | INC RPI |
| 8 | Hambirrao Moze | 1977–1979 | INC |
| 9 | Balasaheb Shirole | 1983 | INC |
| 10 | Datta Ekbote | | NCP |

| # | Portrait | Name | Term of office | | | Election | Party |
|---|---|---|---|---|---|---|---|
| 1 | | Baburao Sanas | 1951 | 1952 | | | Indian National Congress |
| (1) | | Baburao Sanas | 1954 | 1955 | | | |
| | | Bhausaheb Shirole | 1957 | | | | |
| | | Shivajirao Dhere | 1961 | 1962 | | | Indian National Congress |
| | | Baburao Jagtap | 1962 | | | | |
| | | Bhai Vaidya | 1974 | 1975 | | | Samyukta Socialist Party |
| | | Chandrakant Chhajed | 1987 | 1988 | | | Indian National Congress |
| | | Vandana Chavan | 1997 | 1998 | | 1997 | Indian National Congress |
| | | Vatsala Andekar | 1998 | 1999 | | 1997 | Indian National Congress |
| | | Dattatrey Gaikwad | 1999 | 2002 | | 1997 | Indian National Congress |
| | | Dipti Chaudhari | 15 March 2002 | 17 February 2005 | 2 years, 339 days | 2002 | Indian National Congress |
| | | Rajani Tribhuvan | 18 February 2005 | 14 March 2007 | 2 years, 24 days | 2002 | Indian National Congress |
| | | Rajlaxmi Bhonsle | 15 March 2007 | 30 November 2009 | 2 years, 260 days | 2007 | Nationalist Congress Party |
| | | Mohan Singh Rajpal | 1 December 2009 | 14 March 2012 | 2 years, 104 days | 2007 | Nationalist Congress Party |
| | | Vaishali Bankar | 15 March 2012 | 4 September 2013 | 1 year, 173 days | 2012 | Nationalist Congress Party |
| | | Chanchala Kodre | 5 September 2013 | 14 September 2014 | 1 year, 9 days | 2012 | Nationalist Congress Party |
| | | Dattatray Dhankawade | 15 September 2014 | 24 February 2016 | 1 year, 162 days | 2012 | Nationalist Congress Party |
| | | Prashant Jagtap | 25 February 2016 | 14 March 2017 | 1 year, 17 days | 2012 | Nationalist Congress Party |
| | | Mukta Tilak | 15 March 2017 | 21 November 2019 | 2 years, 251 days | 2017 | Bharatiya Janata Party |
| | | Murlidhar Mohol | 22 November 2019 | 14 March 2022 | 2 years, 112 days | 2017 | Bharatiya Janata Party |
| – | | Vacant (Commissioner's rule) | 14 March 2022 | 9 February 2026 | 3 years, 332 days | | |
| | | Manjusha Nagpure | 9 February 2026 | incumbent | 210 days | 2026 | Bharatiya Janata Party |

== See also ==
- Mayor of Mumbai
