= The gold man =

The gold man may refer to:

- Datta Phuge (died 2016), Indian businessman, millionaire and money-taker
- Oregon Pioneer, a 1938 bronze sculpture with gold leaf finish
- Ramesh Wanjale (1965–2011), Maharashtra politician, habit of sporting gold jewellery
