= Khadakwasala Assembly constituency =

Constituency of the Maharashtra legislative assembly in India

Coordinates: 18.45°N 73.78°E

Khadakwasala
- Constituency No. 211 for the Maharashtra Legislative Assembly

Constituency details
- Country: India
- Region: Western India
- State: Maharashtra
- District: Pune
- Lok Sabha constituency: Baramati
- Established: 2008
- Total electors: 576,670
- Reservation: None

Member of Legislative Assembly
- 15th Maharashtra Legislative Assembly
- Incumbent Bhimrao Tapkir
- Party: Bharatiya Janata Party
- Elected year: 2024

Khadakwasla Assembly constituency is one of the 288 Vidhan Sabha (legislative assembly) constituencies of Maharashtra state, western India. This constituency is located in Pune district.

== Geographical scope ==
The constituency comprises as follows:

- Haveli taluka
  - Khed Shivapur revenue circle excluding areas under Pune Municipal Corporation (PMC).
    - Ward no. 143 of PMC (Narhe village)
    - Ward no. 146 of PMC (Nanded village)
    - Ward no. 147 of PMC (Kirkatwadi village)
    - Ward no. 148 of PMC (Khadakwasla village)
  - Kothrud revenue circle excluding areas under (PMC).
    - Ward no. 152 of PMC (Shivne village)
    - Ward no. 153 of PMC (Uttamnagar village)
    - Ward no. 154 of PMC (Kopre village)
    - Ward no. 155 of PMC (Kondhwe Dhavde village)
    - Ward no.54 of PMC (Ambegaon -Dhayari)
  - PMC
    - Ward nos. 31, 140, 144, 145, 149, 151,156, 158.

== Members of Legislative Assembly ==
Year	Member	Party
Till 2009 : Constituency did not exist
2009	Ramesh Wanjale	Maharashtra Navnirman Sena
2011^	Bhimrao Tapkir	Bharatiya Janata Party
2014	Bhimrao Tapkir	Bharatiya Janata Party
2019	Bhimrao Tapkir	Bharatiya Janata Party
2024	Bhimrao Tapkir	Bharatiya Janata Party

== Election results ==
=== Assembly Election 2024 ===
2024 Maharashtra Legislative Assembly election : Khadakwasala
Party	Candidate	Votes	%	±%
BJP	Bhimrao Dhondiba Tapkir	163,131	50.39%	▲1.56
NCP-SP	Sachin Shivaji Dodke	110,809	34.22%	New
MNS	Mayuresh Ramesh Wanjale	42,897	13.25%	New
NOTA	None of the Above	2,900	0.90%	▼0.55
VBA	Sanjay Jairam Divar	2,687	0.83%	▼1.57
Margin of victory		52,322	16.16%	▲15.11
Turnout		326,667	56.65%	▲5.47
Total valid votes		323,767		
Registered electors		576,670		▲18.39
BJP hold		Swing	▲1.56	

=== Assembly Election 2019 ===
2019 Maharashtra Legislative Assembly election : Khadakwasala
Party	Candidate	Votes	%	±%
BJP	Bhimrao Dhondiba Tapkir	120,518	48.83%	▲0.97
NCP	Sachin Shivaji Dodke	117,923	47.78%	▲26.96
VBA	Appa Akhade	5,931	2.40%	New
NOTA	None of the Above	3,561	1.44%	▲0.54
Margin of victory		2,595	1.05%	▼25.99
Turnout		250,520	51.43%	▼3.75
Total valid votes		246,811		
Registered electors		487,102		▲13.75
BJP hold		Swing	▲0.97	

=== Assembly Election 2014 ===
2014 Maharashtra Legislative Assembly election : Khadakwasala
Party	Candidate	Votes	%	±%
BJP	Bhimrao Dhondiba Tapkir	111,531	47.86%	▼2.39
NCP	Dilip Prabhakar Barate	48,505	20.81%	▼26.39
MNS	Rajabhau Murlidhar Laygude	34,576	14.84%	New
SS	Sham Prabhakar Deshpande	24,521	10.52%	New
INC	Shrirang Ekanath Chavan	8,297	3.56%	New
BSP	Vaibhav Vilas Chandanshive	2,173	0.93%	New
NOTA	None of the Above	2,108	0.90%	New
Independent	Bhagwan Dnyanoba Pasalkar	1,948	0.84%	New
Margin of victory		63,026	27.05%	▲23.99
Turnout		235,181	54.92%	▲21.73
Total valid votes		233,032		
Registered electors		428,239		▲17.96
BJP hold		Swing	▼2.39	

=== Assembly By-election 2011 ===
2011 Maharashtra Legislative Assembly by-election : Khadakwasala
Party	Candidate	Votes	%	±%
BJP	Bhimrao Dhondiba Tapkir	59,634	50.26%	▲33.67
NCP	Dilip Barate	56,009	47.20%	▲15.08
Independent	B.R. Kamble	838	0.71%	New
Margin of victory		3,625	3.05%	▼9.75
Turnout		118,661	32.69%	▼16.69
Total valid votes		118,661		
Registered electors		363,024		▲1.93
BJP gain from MNS		Swing	▲5.33	

=== Assembly Election 2009 ===
2009 Maharashtra Legislative Assembly election : Khadakwasala
Party	Candidate	Votes	%	±%
MNS	Ramesh Wanjale	79,006	44.93%	New
NCP	Vikas Pandharinath Dangat Patil	56,488	32.12%	New
BJP	Murlidhar Mohol	29,171	16.59%	New
Independent	Somnath Shankar Landage	4,392	2.50%	New
RPI(A)	Siddhu Hanumanta Kamble	1,728	0.98%	New
BSP	Babaji Sitaram Shelar	1,378	0.78%	New
Margin of victory		22,518	12.81%	
Turnout		175,937	49.40%	
Total valid votes		175,840		
Registered electors		356,137		
MNS win (new seat)				
