= Bhimrao Tapkir =

Indian politician

Bhimrao (Anna) Tapkir

Member of the Maharashtra Legislative Assembly
- Incumbent
- Assumed office 2011
- Preceded by: Ramesh Wanjale
- Constituency: Khadakwasala

Personal details
- Born: Bhimrao Dhondiba Tapkir; 1 September 1960 (age 65) Pune
- Party: BJP
- Children: 1
- Profession: Politician, Construction
- As of 16 September, 2006

Bhimrao Dhondiba Tapkir alias Anna is an Indian politician and member of the Bharatiya Janata Party. Tapkir is a member of the Maharashtra Legislative Assembly in 2011 (Bypoll), 2014, 2019 & 2024 from the Khadakwasla constituency assembly constituency in Pune.

== Political career ==
MLA Bhimrao Tapkir started his career in 2001 local body election of Pune Municipal Corporation.

He was elected as the Corporator in 2001 election and was re-elected as the corporator in 2006 Pune Municipal Corporation election.

In 2011 after the death of the Maharashtra Navnirman Sena firebrand MLA Ramesh Wanjale he was elected as MLA from Khadakwasala Assembly constituency from the BJP.

In 2014 Maharashtra Legislative Assembly election he was elected 2nd time by defeating NCP Candidate Dilip Barate.

In 2019 Maharashtra Legislative Assembly election, he was elected 3rd time by defeating the NCP Candidate Sachin Dodke.

In 2024 Maharashtra Legislative Assembly election, he was elected 4th time by defeating the NCP-SP Candidate Sachin Dodke.
