= Harphale =

Surname

Harpale (हरपळे) is a surname used by Indian Maratha community. The name is legendary among Maratha Royalties. They were honoured as Sardar, Patil and Deshmukh. They have a Royal Mark of Gaikwad Maharajas of Baroda. They possess Deshmukh rights of villages in Nagpur. Their relations are associated with the prominent Maratha clan of 96 Royal Clans.

== History ==
Harpales are considered to be descendants of King Haru. They also trace their origin to the Gaikwad Maharajas of Baroda. They were Maratha Sardars who came to Pune to support the Prime Ministers (Peshwas) of Maratha Kingdom, after defeat In the Panipat War. Their contribution in Maratha Empire Expansion in India was to fight in wars. Originally Harpale or Gaikwad belonged to the Chittorgah royal family. Kalbhairav and Chamunda Devi of Chittodhgadh are Harpale's main kuldaivats.

== Clan ==
Flag of the Maratha

Harpale

- Lineage: Brahmavansha, descended from the Brahmavanshi king Haru.
- Original seat: Phursungi, Pune, Maharashtra, Jaipur Rajasthan & Pune Area
- Colour of sign, horse and throne: White colour
- Heraldic sign (Nishan): Moon on flagpole
- Clan goddess: Bhavani
- Clan object (Devak): Sunflower(Suryaful)
- Guru: Varuna rishi
- Gotra: Haru
- Veda: Rigveda.
- Other surnames: Zumbre, Devaskar, Dapse, Durge, Dugane, Devtole, Davtole, Dhavas, Dhavkar, Lahul, Lotankar, Verulkar, Vesange, Shahapure, Somavanshi, Sukshen, Songire, Husangbage, Dudhane.(Dudhane have PAWAR Kuli and Edge of sward is devak. How they have Harpale Kuli?) (Total 20)

== See also ==
- Maratha Empire
- Maratha clan system
- List of Maratha dynasties and states
- Gaekwad

== Sources ==
=== Marathi language ===
- Balagi Nathugi Gavand; Govind Moroba Karlekar (1997). Kshytriya Marathyanchi Vanshavali and Shannavkuli aani Surya, Som, Bhramh and Sheshvant. Tukaram book Depo, Madhavbag, Mumbai 4.
- Bhramibhoot sadguru param pujya Moredada (11 July 2002). Shree Shatradharma, Prachalit and pramikh kshtravansh and tyanche gotra, pravar, kuldaivat, kuldevata a Devak. Shree Swami Samarth Seva And Adhyatmik vikas pradhan kendra District Nasik, Taluka Dindori, Maharashtra state.
- Gopal Dajiba Dalwi (1912). Maratha Kulancha Etihas. Vol. 1–6. Induprakash Press, Mumbai.

=== English ===
- Shrivastavya, Vidayanand Swami; Shrivastavya, Birendra Kumar Vidyanand (1952). Are Rajput-Maratha marriages morganatic?. Poona?: Published by D.K. Shrivastavya, for Aitihasik Gaurav Grantha Mala. OCLC 12676711.
- Survey and Calender of Marathi (Modi) Documents (1600-1818) from Aitihasika Lekha Sangraha (historical Journal) Published by Vasudeva Vamana Shastri Khare. K P Bagchi & Company. 1996. ISBN 978-81-7074-166-4.
- People of India. India's communities. K. S. Singh, Anthropological Survey of India. New Delhi, India: Oxford University Press. 1998. ISBN 0-19-563354-7. OCLC 40849565.
