= Ekbote =

Ekbote or Ekabote is a surname native to Indian state of Maharashtra. They belong to Deshastha Rigvedi Brahmin (DRB) community. and also Swakul sali vinakar community.

Notable people with the surname include:

- Ashwini Ekbote (1972–2016), Indian actress and dancer
- Datta Ekbote (c. 1936–2020), Indian activist and politician from Pune
- Gopal Rao Ekbote (1912–1994), Indian judge from Andhra Pradesh
- Milind Ekbote, Indian businessman
