= Manjari Bk =

Village in Maharashtra, India

- Village
- Location within Maharashtra Location within India
- Coordinates: 18°30′02″N 73°58′10″E
- Country: India
- State: Maharashtra
- District: Pune
- Taluka: Haveli

Government
  - Type: Under Pune Municipal co-operation

Area
  - Total: 10.48 km^{2} (4.05 sq mi)
- Elevation: 555 m (1,821 ft)

Population (2011)
  - Total: 36,820
  - Density: 3,513/km^{2} (9,100/sq mi)

Languages
  - Official: Marathi
  - Other: Hindi, Kannada, Marwari, English
- Time zone: UTC+5:30 (IST)
- PIN: 412307
- STD code: 02187
- Vehicle registration: MH-12

Manjari Bk is a village in Haveli Taluka, Pune District, Maharashtra, India. It is located in the suburb of Pune, approximately 12 kilometres east of the city center of Pune. In 2011, it had a population of 36,820.

== Geography ==
Manjari Bk is south of Mula-Mutha River. It is bounded by Gopalpatti to the north, Loni Kalbhor to the east, Fursungi to the south, and Magapratta to the west. It occupies an area of 1,048.34 hectares.

== Demographics ==
According to the 2011 Census of India, there are 8,401 households in Manjari Bk. Among the 36,816 residents, 19,244 are male and 17,572 are female. The literacy rate is 74.34%, with 15,165 of the male population and 12,204 of the female population being literate. Its census location code is 556232.
