= Shirgaon, Ratnagiri =

Village in Maharashtra

Shirgaon
- village
- Location in Maharashtra, India Shirgaon (India)
- Coordinates: 17.453°N 73.626°E
- Country: India
- State: Maharashtra
- District: Ratnagiri
- Elevation: 75 m (246 ft)

Languages
  - Official: Marathi
- Time zone: UTC+5:30 (IST)
- PIN: 415603
- Telephone code: 02355
- Vehicle registration: MH-08

Shirgaon is a village in the Ratnagiri district of the state of Maharashtra, India.

== Location ==
Shirgaon is in the Chiplun taluka, with the town of Chiplun, 13 km away, being the nearest urban area. Shirgaon is located on the Guhagar Bijapur Highway, SH 71.

Shirgaon is divided in three parts, consisting of Varachi wadi (upper section), Khalachi wadi (lower section) and Bajarpeth (market).

The area around Shirgaon is fed by two rivers.

== Religion ==
Locals honour the goddesses Mahakali, Sukhai and Varadayini, with the main temple located in Kumbharli. Also the Gramdevat temple is situated in Shirgaon Varchi Vadi. Shirgaon also has two Hanuman temples and one Lord Dattatraya temple.

Shirgaon also celebrates Ganesh Utsav and Shimaga Utsav. There also is a Chabina celebration in Varchi and Khalachi wadi on different dates. Chabina is one of the most important festivals in the village.

== Education ==
The Shirgaon High School serves Shirgaon and the surrounding area.
