= Murlidhar Mohol =

Indian politician (born 1974)

- मुरलीधर मोहोळ
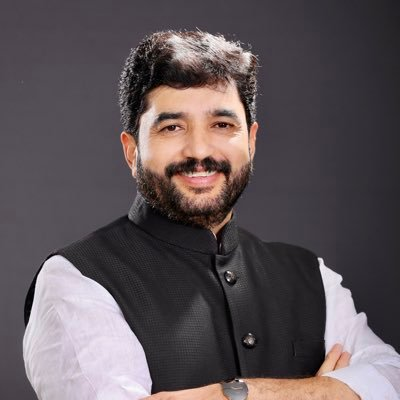
- Mohol in 2024

Union Minister of State
- Incumbent
- Assumed office 9 June 2024
- Minister: Kinjarapu Ram Mohan Naidu; Amit Shah
- Ministry & Departments: Civil Aviation; Cooperation (serving with Krishan Pal Gurjar)

Member of Parliament, Lok Sabha
- Incumbent
- Assumed office 4 June 2024
- Preceded by: Girish Bapat
- Constituency: Pune, Maharashtra

Mayor of Pune
- In office November 2019 – 15 March 2022
- Preceded by: Mukta Tilak
- Succeeded by: Manjusha Nagpure

Personal details
- Born: 9 November 1974 (age 51) Hyderabad, Maharashtra, India
- Party: Bhartiya Janata Party
- Spouse: Monika Mohol (m. 2002)
- Children: 2
- Website: www.pmc.gov.in/en/murlidhar-mohol

Murlidhar Kisan Mohol (born 9 November 1974) is an Indian politician and a member of the Bharatiya Janata Party (BJP). He was elected as the Member of Parliament (MP) for the Pune Lok Sabha constituency in the 2024 Indian general election. Despite being a first-term MP, he was appointed as the Minister of State for Cooperation and Civil Aviation in the Indian central government. Previously, Mohol served as the Mayor of Pune from November 2019 to March 2022.

== Early life ==
Murlidhar Kisan Mohol was born in Mulshi taluka. In 1975, his family moved to Pune, settling in Kothrud. Coming from a family of wrestlers, Mohol took up wrestling during his school years and pursued formal training in Kolhapur while continuing his education with his close friend Pravin Tarde.He holds a Bachelor of Arts degree from Shivaji University. At the age of 12, he joined as a member of the Rashtriya Swayamsevak Sangh (RSS), a nationalist social volunteer organisation and laying the foundation for his political career. After completing his education in 1996, Mohol became actively involved in politics with the Bharatiya Janata Party (BJP), rising through the ranks to become the chief of the Bharatiya Janata Yuva Morcha (BJYM) for Pune.

== Political career ==
=== Timeline ===
- 1993: Entered politics and began organizing at the ward level in Pune.
- 2002: Elected as a member of the Municipal Board of Education.
- 2006: Won the municipal by-election for the Kelewadi Ward.
- 2009: Contested the state assembly elections from Khadakwasla but was defeated.
- 2012: His wife, Monica Mohol, won the municipal election from Ideal Colony.
- 2017: Elected as a corporator from the 12 C ward of Pune Municipal Corporation and appointed chairman of the Standing Committee.
- November 2019: Elected as the Mayor of Pune, succeeding Mukta Tilak.
- 2021: Under his leadership, Pune was recognized as one of the 50 champion cities for the Global Mayors Challenge.
- March 2022: The term of the Pune Municipal Corporation ended, concluding his tenure as Mayor.
- 2024: Elected as a Member of Parliament (MP) from Pune Lok Sabha constituency and inducted as a Minister of State in the Narendra Modi government.

== Electoral history ==
Murlidhar Mohol's Electoral History
Year	Election	Constituency	Opponent	Result	Margin
2002	Pune Municipal Corporation	Kelewadi Ward		Won	+
2009	Maharashtra Legislative Assembly	Khadakwasla	Ramesh Wanjale (MNS)	Lost	-49,793
2017	Pune Municipal Corporation	12 C Ward		Won	+
2024	2024 Indian general election	Pune	Ravindra Dhangekar (INC)	Won	+123,038 votes

== Mayor of Pune ==
Mohol served as the Mayor of Pune from November 2019 to 2022. He succeeded Mukta Tilak in this role. During his tenure, Mohol focused on several key initiatives aimed at improving the city's infrastructure and public services.

=== Pune as a Champion City ===
During Murlidhar Mohol's tenure as Mayor of Pune, the city was recognized as one of the 50 Champion Cities in the 2021 Global Mayors Challenge, organized by Bloomberg Philanthropies. This recognition was awarded for Pune's innovative urban solutions developed in response to the COVID-19 pandemic. The city's proposal focused on increasing the adoption of electric vehicles (EVs) to reduce vehicular pollution, which contributes nearly 25% of particulate pollution in Pune. The plan included preparing a city EV-readiness plan and establishing an EV fund to incentivize the use of electric vehicles. This initiative was part of Pune's broader efforts to promote sustainable urban mobility and improve air quality. He also inaugurated India's first indigenously built Airbus A320 fixed base flight simulator, giving a boost to Make In India initiative in the Civil Aviation field. The recognition as a Champion City highlighted Pune's commitment to innovative and sustainable urban development under Mohol's leadership.

=== Pollution Abatement of Rivers Mula-Mutha Project ===
Mohol played a key role in the Pollution Abatement of Rivers Mula-Mutha project, which is supported by the Japan International Cooperation Agency. This initiative aims to address the severe pollution issues affecting the Mula-Mutha River in Pune. The project involves an Official Development Assistance (ODA) amounting to Rs. 1470 crore. The foundation stone for this significant environmental project was laid by Prime Minister Narendra Modi in 2022. The project's objective is to improve the river's water quality, enhance the riverfront areas, and promote sustainable urban development in Pune.

=== Medical College ===
One of his significant contributions was the establishment of the Bharat Ratna Atal Bihari Vajpayee Medical College, which was proposed during the BJP's inaugural Standing Committee Budget session of 2017-18 under his chairmanship. The project received an initial allocation of Rs. 25 crores and aimed to address the healthcare needs of Pune's residents.

=== Pune Metro Project ===
The Pune Metro Rail Project, approved by the Government of India in 2016, saw notable developments under his leadership. A key milestone was the inauguration of a 12 km segment of the Pune Metro on March 6, 2022, by Prime Minister Narendra Modi. This segment was an important step in improving the city's transportation system. The project also focused on using solar power, which helped reduce carbon dioxide emissions by around 25,000 tons annually.

== Member of Parliament ==
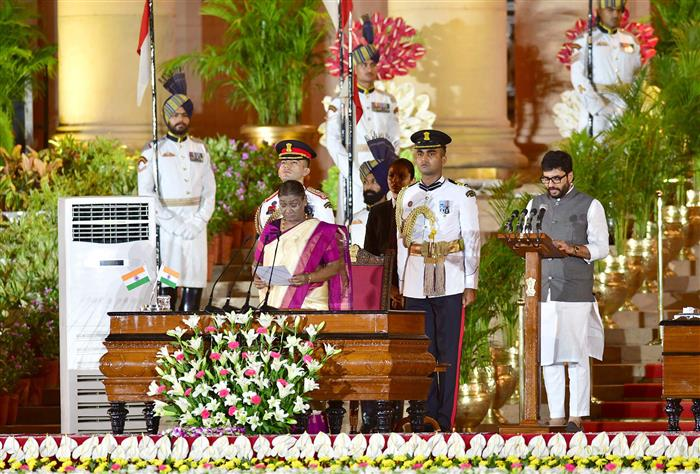
President of India Droupadi Murmu administering the oath as Minister of State in third Narendra Modi ministry to Murlidhar Mohol at a Swearing-in Ceremony at Rashtrapati Bhavan, in New Delhi on June 09, 2024.

In the 2024 Lok Sabha elections, Mohol contested from the Pune constituency as a candidate of the Bharatiya Janata Party (BJP). He won the election, defeating Congress candidate Ravindra Dhangekar by a margin of 123,038 votes. This victory allowed the BJP to retain the Pune seat for the third consecutive term. Mohol's background as a former mayor of Pune and his connection to the Maratha community were considered significant factors in his electoral success. As a first-time Member of Parliament, Mohol was appointed as a Minister of State in Prime Minister Narendra Modi's third government.

== See also ==
- Third Modi ministry
