= Arvind Lele =

Arvind Lele (1935-2006) was among the veteran Jana Sangh and BJP leaders from Maharashtra state in India. He was associated with RSS from early age, and made a name for himself as a Jana Sangh leader in Pune area in 1960s.

He was Ayurvedic doctor (B.A.M.S. - Bachelor of Ayurvedic medicine and Science) by profession and continued medical practice for 4 years after graduation.

Later he devoted his life for Jan Sangh and was a key person for spreading Jan Sangh in Maharashtra. He was arrested during emergency on 2 October 1975 and was jailed for 16 months. Many veteran leaders of RSS and political parties were released on 26 January 1977 when then Prime Minister India Gandhi announced general elections.

Lele won from Kasba Peth Vidhan Sabha seat in 1978 as Janata Party and in 1980 as BJP candidate, but lost from the same seat in 1985 as a BJP candidate.

Arvind Lele had translated Hindi poems of Atal Bihari Vajpayee into Marathi language. His poetry also published in book 'Akshar Swapna'. Lele died in Pune in 2006 at the age of 71 after prolonged illness.

In 2008, a book with title "Krutarth" on his life was released. This book is written by Mr. Ravindra Gole and published by Hindusthan Prakashan Sanstha, Mumbai. The book was released by BJP leader L K Advani in Pune.
