= Kasba Peth Assembly constituency =

Indian constituency

Coordinates: 18°31′25.03″N 73°51′21.22″E

Kasba Peth
- Constituency No. 215 for the Maharashtra Legislative Assembly

Constituency details
- Country: India
- Region: Western India
- State: Maharashtra
- District: Pune
- Lok Sabha constituency: Pune
- Established: 1957
- Total electors: 283,672
- Reservation: None

Member of Legislative Assembly
- 15th Maharashtra Legislative Assembly
- Incumbent Hemant Rasane
- Party: BJP
- Elected year: 2024

Kasba Peth Assembly constituency is one of the constituencies of Maharashtra Legislative Assembly, in India. It is constituency is located in the Pune district and is a segment of Pune (Lok Sabha constituency).

It is considered a stronghold of the Bharatiya Janata Party, as it had elected BJP MLAs from 1995 to 2024, with the exception the constituency elected the Indian National Congress politician Ravindra Dhangekar in a by-election in 2023, upturning this trend, though the BJP regained the seat in 2024.

In 2024 Maharashtra Legislative Assembly Election BJP candidate Hemant Rasane made a spectacular comeback by defeating INC candidate Ravindra Dhangekar, resulting in BJP retaining its Bastion of Kasba Peth in just 1.5 years

== Members of the Legislative Assembly ==
Year	Member	Party
1957	Vishnu Chitale	Communist Party of India
1962	Baburao Sanas	Indian National Congress
1967	R. V. Telang	Indian National Congress
1972	Lilaba Merchant	Indian National Congress
1978	Arvind Lele	Janata Party
1980	Arvind Lele	Bharatiya Janata Party
1985	Ulhas Kalokhe	Indian National Congress
1990	Anna Joshi	Bharatiya Janata Party
1991^	Vasant Thorat	Indian National Congress
1995	Girish Bapat	Bharatiya Janata Party
1999	Girish Bapat	Bharatiya Janata Party
2004	Girish Bapat	Bharatiya Janata Party
2009	Girish Bapat	Bharatiya Janata Party
2014	Girish Bapat	Bharatiya Janata Party
2019	Mukta Tilak	Bharatiya Janata Party
2023^	Ravindra Dhangekar	Indian National Congress
2024	Hemant Rasane	Bharatiya Janata Party

By-elections denoted by ^

== Election results ==
=== Assembly Election 2024 ===
2024 Maharashtra Legislative Assembly election : Kasba Peth
Party	Candidate	Votes	%	±%
BJP	Hemant Rasane	90,046	53.79	▲8.24
INC	Ravindra Dhangekar	70,623	42.19	▼11.33
MNS	Bhokre Ganesh Somnath	4,894	2.92	New
NOTA	None of the Above	1,213	0.72	▼0.30
Margin of victory		19,423	11.60	▲3.63
Turnout		168,607	59.44	▲9.33
Total valid votes		167,394		
Registered electors		283,672		▲2.89
BJP gain from INC		Swing	▲0.27	

=== Assembly By-election 2023 ===
2023 Maharashtra Legislative Assembly by-election : Kasba Peth
Party	Candidate	Votes	%	±%
INC	Ravindra Dhangekar	73,309	53.52	▲21.46
BJP	Hemant Rasane	62,394	45.55	▼5.62
NOTA	None of the Above	1,401	1.02	▼0.69
Margin of victory		10,915	7.97	▼11.14
Turnout		138,103	50.09	▼1.07
Total valid votes		136,980		
Registered electors		275,717		▼5.16
INC gain from BJP		Swing	▲2.35	

=== Assembly Election 2019 ===
2019 Maharashtra Legislative Assembly election : Kasba Peth
Party	Candidate	Votes	%	±%
BJP	Mukta Tilak	75,492	51.17	▲7.37
INC	Arvind Shinde	47,296	32.06	▲13.42
Independent	Dhanwade Vishal Gorakh	13,989	9.48	New
MNS	Ajay Shinde	8,284	5.61	▼9.86
NOTA	None of the Above	2,532	1.72	▲0.90
Independent	Yuvraj Bhujbal	1,072	0.73	New
Margin of victory		28,196	19.11	▼6.05
Turnout		150,093	51.63	▼10.32
Total valid votes		147,537		
Registered electors		290,724		▲5.66
BJP hold		Swing	▲7.37	

=== Assembly Election 2014 ===
2014 Maharashtra Legislative Assembly election : Kasba Peth
Party	Candidate	Votes	%	±%
BJP	Girish Bapat	73,594	43.80	▲8.46
INC	Dr. Rohit Deepak Tilak	31,322	18.64	▼11.39
MNS	Ravindra Dhangekar	25,998	15.47	▼14.62
NCP	Deepak Mankar	15,865	9.44	New
Independent	Suryakant Alias Banduanna Aandekar	10,001	5.95	New
SS	Badhe Prashant Laxman	9,203	5.48	New
NOTA	None of the Above	1,371	0.82	New
Margin of victory		42,272	25.16	▲19.91
Turnout		169,400	61.57	▲12.00
Total valid votes		168,028		
Registered electors		275,138		▼13.23
BJP hold		Swing	▲8.46	

=== Assembly Election 2009 ===
2009 Maharashtra Legislative Assembly election : Kasba Peth
Party	Candidate	Votes	%	±%
BJP	Girish Bapat	54,982	35.34	▼20.47
MNS	Ravindra Dhangekar	46,820	30.09	New
INC	Dr. Rohit Deepak Tilak	46,728	30.03	New
BSP	Mohol Satish Baban	1,396	0.90	New
SP	Anis Ahmmad	1,110	0.71	New
ABHM	Milind Ramakant Ekbote	1,027	0.66	▼1.03
Margin of victory		8,162	5.25	▼8.82
Turnout		155,625	49.08	▼5.76
Total valid votes		155,587		
Registered electors		317,093		▲154.26
BJP hold		Swing	▼20.47	

=== Assembly Election 2004 ===
2004 Maharashtra Legislative Assembly election : Kasba Peth
Party	Candidate	Votes	%	±%
BJP	Girish Bapat	38,160	55.81	▲1.16
NCP	Anna Thorat	28,542	41.74	▲15.05
ABHM	Savarkar Himani Ashok	1,158	1.69	New
Independent	Tikone Vijay Hiralal	516	0.75	New
Margin of victory		9,618	14.07	▼13.89
Turnout		68,398	54.84	▼1.88
Total valid votes		68,376		
Registered electors		124,712		▼1.95
BJP hold		Swing	▲1.16	

=== Assembly Election 1999 ===
1999 Maharashtra Legislative Assembly election : Kasba Peth
Party	Candidate	Votes	%	±%
BJP	Girish Bapat	39,419	54.65	▼3.66
NCP	Anna Thorat	19,251	26.69	New
INC	Balgude Sanjay Digambar	13,065	18.11	▼17.37
Margin of victory		20,168	27.96	▲5.14
Turnout		73,698	57.94	▼17.06
Total valid votes		72,130		
Registered electors		127,189		▲3.14
BJP hold		Swing	▼3.66	

=== Assembly Election 1995 ===
1995 Maharashtra Legislative Assembly election : Kasba Peth
Party	Candidate	Votes	%	±%
BJP	Girish Bapat	53,043	58.31	New
INC	Dr. Satish Desai	32,283	35.49	New
Independent	Sayed Badshah Noor Mohammed	2,213	2.43	New
JD	Shah Devichand Deepchand	642	0.71	New
Margin of victory		20,760	22.82	
Turnout		91,959	74.57	
Total valid votes		90,969		
Registered electors		123,312		
BJP gain from INC		Swing		

=== Assembly By-election 1991 ===
1991 Maharashtra Legislative Assembly by-election : Kasba Peth
Party	Candidate	Votes	%	±%
INC	T. V. Vithoba	37,100		
BJP	Girish Bapat	31,775		
Margin of victory		5,325		
Turnout				
Total valid votes		0		
INC gain from BJP		Swing		

=== Assembly Election 1990 ===
1990 Maharashtra Legislative Assembly election : Kasba Peth
Party	Candidate	Votes	%	±%
BJP	Anna Joshi	49,152	53.25	▲10.98
INC	Shantilal Suratwala	42,075	45.58	▼2.45
Margin of victory		7,077	7.67	▲1.91
Turnout		93,040	68.41	▲5.06
Total valid votes		92,311		
Registered electors		135,998		▲15.29
BJP gain from INC		Swing	▲5.22	

=== Assembly Election 1985 ===
1985 Maharashtra Legislative Assembly election : Kasba Peth
Party	Candidate	Votes	%	±%
INC	Ulhas Nathoba Kalokhe	35,588	48.03	New
BJP	Arvind Lele	31,321	42.27	▼0.81
Independent	Appa Thorat	5,980	8.07	New
Margin of victory		4,267	5.76	▲0.38
Turnout		74,651	63.29	▲7.75
Total valid votes		74,101		
Registered electors		117,957		▼3.01
INC gain from BJP		Swing	▲4.95	

=== Assembly Election 1980 ===
1980 Maharashtra Legislative Assembly election : Kasba Peth
Party	Candidate	Votes	%	±%
BJP	Arvind Lele	28,851	43.07	New
INC(I)	Dhere Prakash Keshavrao	25,249	37.70	New
INC(U)	Shantilal Suratwala	11,991	17.90	New
Margin of victory		3,602	5.38	▼22.40
Turnout		67,692	55.66	▼19.01
Total valid votes		66,980		
Registered electors		121,622		▲5.25
BJP gain from JP		Swing	▼17.89	

=== Assembly Election 1978 ===
1978 Maharashtra Legislative Assembly election : Kasba Peth
Party	Candidate	Votes	%	±%
JP	Arvind Lele	52,190	60.96	New
INC	Ulhas Shedge	28,410	33.18	▼16.84
SS	Ghate Bhagwant Alias Nandkumar Laxman	4,099	4.79	▲0.65
Margin of victory		23,780	27.78	▼3.19
Turnout		86,624	74.96	▲4.42
Total valid votes		85,612		
Registered electors		115,556		▲70.74
JP gain from INC		Swing	▲10.94	

=== Assembly Election 1972 ===
1972 Maharashtra Legislative Assembly election : Kasba Peth
Party	Candidate	Votes	%	±%
INC	Lilaba Merchant	23,586	50.03	▲1.75
SSP	Rambhau Wadke	8,987	19.06	New
ABJS	Narayan Vaidya	8,103	17.19	▲5.2
Independent	Patel Husen Mohamad	4,050	8.59	New
SS	Kaka Wadke	1,949	4.13	New
Margin of victory		14,599	30.96	▲22.05
Turnout		48,014	70.94	▼1.50
Total valid votes		47,148		
Registered electors		67,679		▲3.01
INC hold		Swing	▲1.75	

=== Assembly Election 1967 ===
1967 Maharashtra Legislative Assembly election : Kasba Peth
Party	Candidate	Votes	%	±%
INC	R. V. Telang	22,567	48.27	▼6.77
SSP	R. P. Vadake	18,398	39.35	New
ABJS	P. H. Kapoor	5,603	11.98	▼0.53
Margin of victory		4,169	8.92	▼24.40
Turnout		49,289	75.02	▲1.58
Total valid votes		46,751		
Registered electors		65,699		▼7.28
INC hold		Swing	▼6.77	

=== Assembly Election 1962 ===
1962 Maharashtra Legislative Assembly election : Kasba Peth
Party	Candidate	Votes	%	±%
INC	Baburao Narayanrao Sans	27,135	55.04	▲6.56
Independent	Kaluram Udansing Pardeshi	10,710	21.72	New
ABJS	Vasant Digamber Malegaonkar	6,172	12.52	New
CPI	Narsing Mahadev Tilekar	5,032	10.21	▼41.31
Margin of victory		16,425	33.32	▲30.29
Turnout		51,698	72.96	▼5.00
Total valid votes		49,300		
Registered electors		70,855		▲6.18
INC gain from CPI		Swing	▲3.53	

=== Assembly Election 1957 ===
1957 Bombay State Legislative Assembly election : Kasba Peth
Party	Candidate	Votes	%	±%
CPI	Chitale Vishnu Dattatraya	25,637	51.52	New
INC	Sathe Vinayak Krishna	24,129	48.48	New
Turnout		49,766	74.58	
Total valid votes		49,766		
Registered electors		66,732		
INC win (new seat)				

== See also ==
- List of constituencies of Maharashtra Vidhan Sabha
