= V. D. Chitale =

Indian politician (1906–1961)

V.D. Chitale

Member of the Bombay Legislative Assembly
- In office 1957–1962
- Succeeded by: Baburao Narayanrao Sanas
- Constituency: Kasba Peth

Personal details
- Born: Vishnu Damodar Chitale; 4 January 1906
- Died: 1961 (aged 54–55)
- Party: Communist Party of India

Vishnu Damodar Chitale (1906–1961) was an Indian freedom fighter, nationalist and prominent leader of the Communist Party of India in Poona city. He was a staunch opponent of British imperialism in India. He was also a Sanskrit scholar.

Chitale was born on 4 January 1906. Better known as 'Bhai Chitale', he completed his B.A. in 1929 from Pune. He could not complete his Masters of Law degree; as he focused his attention on national movements. He participated in the freedom struggle orchestrated by the Congress and came into contact with Marxist literature. He became a member of the Communist Party but continued to participate in the Congress movements. He gave priority to the work of the interest of farmers and labourers. He took an active part in the Salt Satyagraha. He was also elected a member of the All India Congress Committee. At the 1940 Ramgarh session of the Indian National Congress, Chitale and fellow communist delegate K.M. Ashraf proposed an amendment to the main resolution, calling for 'immediate launching of the struggle' for independence and rejecting any compromise with British rule.

Chitale led the third 1955 satyagrah to Goa, leading a thousand volunteers in a march to demand integration of Portuguese-controlled Goa with India. Portuguese military forces opened fire, injuring Chitale among many others.

Chitale was elected to the Bombay Legislative Assembly in the 1957 election, from the Kasba Peth constituency. He was part of the Samyukta Maharashtra Samiti bloc in the Legislative Assembly. He died in 1961.
