= Vaishali Bankar =

Indian politician

52nd Mayor of Pune
- In office 16 March 2012 – 12 August 2013
- Preceded by: Mohansingh Rajpal

Personal details
- Party: Nationalist Congress Party
- Spouse: Sunil Bankar
- Website: http://vaishalibankar.com/

Vaishali Bankar was the fifty second mayor of Pune, Maharashtra, India. She is the seventh woman to hold that post. She was elected mayor after the 2012 Pune Municipal Corporation elections.

Bankar has stated that she would undertake development works in the city of Pune, including the construction of public urinals. She also stated that issues related to women's rights are her top priority.

Bankar resigned on 12 August 2013 after criticism over her international trips accompanied by members of her family. She became the first Pune mayor to resign before the end of her term.
