= Prasanna Jagtap =

Indian politician

Prasanna Jagtap is an Indian politician. He was the former Deputy Mayor of Pune from the Indian National Congress Party. In December 2016, Jagtap left the Congress party and entered Bhartiya Janata Party in the presence of former guardian minister and Member of the parliament Girish Bapat.
