= Dattatray Dhankawade =

Indian politician

- दत्तात्रय धनकवडे

Mayor of Pune
- In office September 2014 – 2016
- Succeeded by: Mukta Tilak

Personal details
- Citizenship: Indian
- Party: Nationalist Congress Party

Dattatray Dhankawade is an Indian politician. He was elected Mayor of Pune in September 2014. He negotiated the budget of the Pune Metro project with the central government during his tenure.

Dhankawade resigned as mayor and was succeeded in 2016 by Prashant Jagtap, another NCP member.
