= Ramesh Wanjale =

Indian politician (1965–2011)

Ramesh Hiraman Wanjale

Member of Maharashtra Legislative Assembly
- In office 2009–2011
- Succeeded by: Bhimrao Tapkir
- Constituency: Khadakwasla

Personal details
- Born: 12 November 1965 Ahire, Taluka - Haveli, District - Pune
- Died: 10 June 2011 (aged 45) Vadgaon Khurd, Taluka - Haveli, District - Pune
- Party: Maharashtra Navnirman Sena
- Spouse: Harshada Wanjale
- Children: One son and two daughters

Ramesh Hiraman Wanjale (12 November 1965 – 10 June 2011) was a Maharashtra politician. He was fondly known as the "gold man" in the Pune district because of his habit of sporting gold jewellery. He died on 10 June 2011 (aged 45) due to heart attack.

== Political Journey ==
Ramesh Wanjale began his political career as the sarpanch of Ahire village. He later became an MLA in 2009, representing the Khadakwasla constituency as a member of the Maharashtra Navnirman Sena (MNS). Before joining the MNS, Wanjale was affiliated with the Indian National Congress and served as the Deputy Chairman of the Haveli Panchayat Committee. He was the only MNS MLA from Pune. Wanjale is survived by his wife, Harshada Wanjale, who is also active in politics and serves as a member of the Pune Zilla Parishad, along with their three children.

=== 2009 Maharashtra Legislative Assembly Elections ===
In the 2009 Maharashtra Legislative Assembly elections, Ramesh Wanjale contested from the Khadakwasla constituency as a candidate of the Maharashtra Navnirman Sena (MNS). He secured a resounding victory, defeating Murlidhar Mohol of the Bharatiya Janata Party (BJP) by a substantial margin. This win marked a significant milestone for the MNS, as it opened the party's account in the state assembly. Wanjale's victory in Khadakwasla was seen as a major upset, as he outperformed the established political parties in a constituency that had traditionally been a stronghold of the BJP and the Nationalist Congress Party (NCP).

2009 Maharashtra Legislative Assembly Elections - Khadakwasla
Year	Election	Constituency	Opponent	Result
2009	Maharashtra Legislative Assembly	Khadakwasla	Murlidhar Mohol (BJP)	Won
