= 2026 Pune Municipal Corporation election =

Local elections in Maharashtra, India

- 15 January 2026

All 165 seats in Pune Municipal Corporation 83 seats needed for a majority

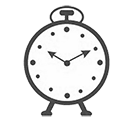

	First party	Second party	Third party
Party	BJP	NCP	INC
Last election	97	39	9
Seats won	118	26	16
Seat change	▲22	▼13	▲7
	Fourth party	Fifth party	Sixth party
Party	NCP(SP)	SS(UBT)	RPI(A)
Last election	new	new	1
Seats won	3	1	1
Seat change	new	new	-
	Seventh party	Eighth party
Party	SS	MNS
Last election	10	2
Seats won	0	0
Seat change	▼10	▼2

The 2026 Pune Municipal Corporation election was an election of members to the Pune Municipal Corporation which governs Pune, the 7th largest metropolis in India. The election took place on 15 January 2026 and the counting took place on 16 January 2026. The Bharatiya Janata Party won a decisive victory winning 119 of the 168 seats. BJP's Manjusha Nagpure was elected as the mayor and RPI(A)'s Parshuram Wadekar as the deputy mayor.

== Background ==
After the Pune Municipal Corporation (PMC) elections of 2017, the city was divided into 41 administrative wards, electing a total of 162 corporators, with each ward returning four members. As per the latest ward formation and reservation draft notification issued by the Government of Maharashtra, The city is divided into 41 wards(प्रभाग). 40 wards are represented by 4 corporators(नगरसेवक) each, while 1 ward(No. 38) is represented by 5 corporators. Thus, the general body consists of 165 elected councilors or corporators. All major political parties active in the state, contest the elections.

== Schedule ==
=== Ward Structure Event ===
Structure Event	Schedule
Draft Ward Structure	22 August 2025
Objections and Suggestion	11 & 12 September 2025
Final draft	6 October 2025

=== Poll Event ===
Poll Event	Schedule
Issue of notification of election	15 December 2025
Last Date for filing nomination	30 December 2025
Scrutiny of Nominations	31 December 2025
Withdrawal of Candidature	2 January 2026
Date of Poll	15 January 2026
Date of Counting	16 January 2026

== Result ==
Sr. no	Ward Number	Ward Name	Seat	Winner	Party
1	1	Kalas-Dhanori-Lohegaon	A	Ashwini Rahul (Appa) Bhandare	Bharatiya Janata Party
2	1	Kalas-Dhanori-Lohegaon	B	Dangat Sangita Sandeep	Bharatiya Janata Party
3	1	Kalas-Dhanori-Lohegaon	C	Rekha Chandrakant Tingre	Nationalist Congress Party
4	1	Kalas-Dhanori-Lohegaon	D	Anil (Bobby) Vasantrao Tingre	Bharatiya Janata Party
5	2	Phulenagar-Nagpur Chawl	A	Dhende Nandini Siddharth	Nationalist Congress Party
6	2	Phulenagar-Nagpur Chawl	B	Ravi (Harshal) Ramesh Tingre	Nationalist Congress Party
7	2	Phulenagar-Nagpur Chawl	C	Shital Ajay Sawant	Nationalist Congress Party
8	2	Phulenagar-Nagpur Chawl	D	Suhas Vijay Tingre	Nationalist Congress Party
9	3	Vimannagar-Lohegaon	A	Dr. Shreyas Pritam Khandve	Bharatiya Janata Party
10	3	Vimannagar-Lohegaon	B	Anil Dilip Satav	Bharatiya Janata Party
11	3	Vimannagar-Lohegaon	C	Aishwarya Surendra Pathare	Bharatiya Janata Party
12	3	Vimannagar-Lohegaon	D	Dabhade Ramdas Dattatray	Bharatiya Janata Party
13	4	Kharadi-Wagholi	A	Shri. Bansode Shailjeet Jaywant	Bharatiya Janata Party
14	4	Kharadi-Wagholi	B	Ratnamala Sandeep Satav	Bharatiya Janata Party
15	4	Kharadi-Wagholi	C	Bharane Trupti Santosh	Bharatiya Janata Party
16	4	Kharadi-Wagholi	D	Surendra Bapusaheb Pathare	Bharatiya Janata Party
17	5	Kalyaninagar-Vadgaonsheri	A	Narayan Mohan Galande	Bharatiya Janata Party
18	5	Kalyaninagar-Vadgaonsheri	B	Galande Shweta Mukund	Bharatiya Janata Party
19	5	Kalyaninagar-Vadgaonsheri	C	Galande Kavita Mahendra	Bharatiya Janata Party
20	5	Kalyaninagar-Vadgaonsheri	D	Mulik Yogesh Tukaram	Bharatiya Janata Party
21	6	Yerawada-Gandhinagar	A	Adv. Avinash Raj Salve	Indian National Congress
22	6	Yerawada-Gandhinagar	B	Saira Hanif Sheikh	Indian National Congress
23	6	Yerawada-Gandhinagar	C	Ashwini Daniel Landge	Indian National Congress
24	6	Yerawada-Gandhinagar	D	Vishal Hari Malke	Indian National Congress
25	7	Gokhalenagar-Wakdewadi	A	Manvatkar Nisha Sachin	Bharatiya Janata Party
26	7	Gokhalenagar-Wakdewadi	B	Anjali Vinodanna Orse	Nationalist Congress Party
27	7	Gokhalenagar-Wakdewadi	C	Adv. Nikam Nilesh Narayan	Nationalist Congress Party
28	7	Gokhalenagar-Wakdewadi	D	Datta Bahirat	Nationalist Congress Party
29	8	Aundh-Bopodi	A	Parshuram Balkrishna Wadekar	Republican Party of India (Athawale)
30	8	Aundh-Bopodi	B	Bhakti Ajit Gaikwad	Bharatiya Janata Party
31	8	Aundh-Bopodi	C	Chhajed Sapna Anand	Bharatiya Janata Party
32	8	Aundh-Bopodi	D	Chandrashekhar (Sunny) Vinayak Nimhan	Bharatiya Janata Party
33	9	Sus-Baner-Pashan	A	Chimte Rohini Sudhir	Bharatiya Janata Party
34	9	Sus-Baner-Pashan	B	Chandere Baburao Dattoba	Nationalist Congress Party
35	9	Sus-Baner-Pashan	C	Kokate Mayuri Rahul	Bharatiya Janata Party
36	9	Sus-Baner-Pashan	D	Amol Ratan Balwadkar	Nationalist Congress Party
37	10	Bavdhan-Bhusari Colony	A	Kiran Dagde Patil	Bharatiya Janata Party
38	10	Bavdhan-Bhusari Colony	B	Pawar Rupali Sachin	Bharatiya Janata Party
39	10	Bavdhan-Bhusari Colony	C	Varape Alpana Ganesh	Bharatiya Janata Party
40	10	Bavdhan-Bhusari Colony	D	Vedepatil Dilip Tukaram	Bharatiya Janata Party
41	11	Rambaug Colony-Shivteerthnagar	A	Harshwardhan Deepak Mankar	Nationalist Congress Party
42	11	Rambaug Colony-Shivteerthnagar	B	Dokh Deepali Santosh	Indian National Congress
43	11	Rambaug Colony-Shivteerthnagar	C	Butala Manisha Sandeep	Bharatiya Janata Party
44	11	Rambaug Colony-Shivteerthnagar	D	Adv. Ramchandra (Chandusheth) Atmaram Kadam	Indian National Congress
45	12	Shivajinagar-Model Colony	A	Amruta Ram Mhetre (Zadpe)	Bharatiya Janata Party
46	12	Shivajinagar-Model Colony	B	Shri. Apoorva Dattatray Khade	Bharatiya Janata Party
47	12	Shivajinagar-Model Colony	C	Sau. Pooja Pratul Jagade	Bharatiya Janata Party
48	12	Shivajinagar-Model Colony	D	Ekabote Nivedita Gajanan	Bharatiya Janata Party
49	13	Pune Station-Jay Jawannagar	A	Nilesh Suresh Alhat	Bharatiya Janata Party
50	13	Pune Station-Jay Jawannagar	B	Sumayya Maheboob Nadaf	Indian National Congress
51	13	Pune Station-Jay Jawannagar	C	Vaishali Nagnath Bhalerao	Indian National Congress
52	13	Pune Station-Jay Jawannagar	D	Arvind Shinde	Indian National Congress
53	14	Koregaon Park-Ghorpadi-Mundhwa	A	Himali Navnath Kamble	Bharatiya Janata Party
54	14	Koregaon Park-Ghorpadi-Mundhwa	B	Dhayarkar Kishor Vishnu	Bharatiya Janata Party
55	14	Koregaon Park-Ghorpadi-Mundhwa	C	Kawade Surekha Chandrakant	Nationalist Congress Party
56	14	Koregaon Park-Ghorpadi-Mundhwa	D	Gaikwad Umesh Dnyaneshwar	Bharatiya Janata Party
57	15	Manjri-Budhruk-Keshavnagar-Sadesatranali	A	Abnave Nanda Anil	Bharatiya Janata Party
58	15	Manjri-Budhruk-Keshavnagar-Sadesatranali	B	Dr. Dada Kodre	Bharatiya Janata Party
59	15	Manjri-Budhruk-Keshavnagar-Sadesatranali	C	Ghule Sarika Amit	Bharatiya Janata Party
60	15	Manjri-Budhruk-Keshavnagar-Sadesatranali	D	Ajit Dattatraya Ghule	Nationalist Congress Party
61	16	Hadapsar-Satavwadi	A	Bankar Vaishali Sunil	Nationalist Congress Party
62	16	Hadapsar-Satavwadi	B	Jangle Ujwala Subhash	Bharatiya Janata Party
63	16	Hadapsar-Satavwadi	C	Gawade Nitin Nivrutti	Shiv Sena (Uddhav Balasaheb Thackeray)
64	16	Hadapsar-Satavwadi	D	Tupe Maruti Shivaji	Bharatiya Janata Party
65	17	Ramtekdi-Malwadi-Vaiduwadi	A	Londhe Khandu Satish	Bharatiya Janata Party
66	17	Ramtekdi-Malwadi-Vaiduwadi	B	Hemlata Nilesh Magar	Nationalist Congress Party
67	17	Ramtekdi-Malwadi-Vaiduwadi	C	Payal Viraj Tupe	Bharatiya Janata Party
68	17	Ramtekdi-Malwadi-Vaiduwadi	D	Prashant (Mama) Tupe	Bharatiya Janata Party
69	18	Wanowrie-Salunkhe Vihar	A	Adv. Kedari Sahil Shivaji	Indian National Congress
70	18	Wanowrie-Salunkhe Vihar	B	Kalinda Muralidhar Punde	Bharatiya Janata Party
71	18	Wanowrie-Salunkhe Vihar	C	Komal Samir Shendkar	Bharatiya Janata Party
72	18	Wanowrie-Salunkhe Vihar	D	Jagtap Prashant Sudam	Indian National Congress
73	19	Kondhwa Khurd-Kausurbaug	A	Taslim Hasan Shaikh	Indian National Congress
74	19	Kondhwa Khurd-Kausurbaug	B	Aasia Maniyar	Indian National Congress
75	19	Kondhwa Khurd-Kausurbaug	C	Kashif Fakrul Syed	Indian National Congress
76	19	Kondhwa Khurd-Kausurbaug	D	Pathan Abdul Ghafoor Ahmed	Nationalist Congress Party (Sharadchandra Pawar)
77	20	Shankar Maharaj Math-Bibewadi	A	Aaba (Rajendra) Y. Shilimkar	Bharatiya Janata Party
78	20	Shankar Maharaj Math-Bibewadi	B	Divekar Tanvi Prashant	Bharatiya Janata Party
79	20	Shankar Maharaj Math-Bibewadi	C	Deshpande Mansi Manoj	Bharatiya Janata Party
80	20	Shankar Maharaj Math-Bibewadi	D	Gaurav Ganesh Ghule	Nationalist Congress Party
81	21	Mukundnagar-Salisbury Park	A	Vairage Prasannajit Bharat	Bharatiya Janata Party
82	21	Mukundnagar-Salisbury Park	B	Shilimkar Siddhi Avinash	Bharatiya Janata Party
83	21	Mukundnagar-Salisbury Park	C	Chorbele Manisha Pravin	Bharatiya Janata Party
84	21	Mukundnagar-Salisbury Park	D	Bhimale Srinath Yashwant	Bharatiya Janata Party
85	22	Kashewadi-Dias Plot	A	Mrunal Pandurang (Bappu) Kamble	Bharatiya Janata Party
86	22	Kashewadi-Dias Plot	B	Rafiq Abdul Rahim Sheikh	Indian National Congress
87	22	Kashewadi-Dias Plot	C	Archana Tushar Patil	Bharatiya Janata Party
88	22	Kashewadi-Dias Plot	D	Vivek Mahadev Yadav	Bharatiya Janata Party
89	23	Rawiwar Peth-Nana Peth	A	Javale Pallavi Chandrashekhar	Bharatiya Janata Party
90	23	Rawiwar Peth-Nana Peth	B	Andekar Sonali Vanraj	Nationalist Congress Party
91	23	Rawiwar Peth-Nana Peth	C	Andekar Lakshmi Udayakant	Nationalist Congress Party
92	23	Rawiwar Peth-Nana Peth	D	Dhanwade Vishal Gorakh	Bharatiya Janata Party
93	24	Kasba Ganpati -Kamla Nehru Hospital-KEM hospital	A	Bahirat Kalpana Dilip	Bharatiya Janata Party
94	24	Kasba Ganpati -Kamla Nehru Hospital-KEM hospital	B	Ujwala Ganesh Yadav	Bharatiya Janata Party
95	24	Kasba Ganpati -Kamla Nehru Hospital-KEM hospital	C	Devendra (Chhotu) Wadke	Bharatiya Janata Party
96	24	Kasba Ganpati -Kamla Nehru Hospital-KEM hospital	D	Bidkar Ganesh Madhukar	Bharatiya Janata Party
97	25	Shaniwar Peth-Mahatma Phule Mandai	A	Sau. Swapnali Nitin Pandit	Bharatiya Janata Party
98	25	Shaniwar Peth-Mahatma Phule Mandai	B	Raghavendra (Bappu) Mankar	Bharatiya Janata Party
99	25	Shaniwar Peth-Mahatma Phule Mandai	C	Swarada Gaurav Bapat	Bharatiya Janata Party
100	25	Shaniwar Peth-Mahatma Phule Mandai	D	Tilak Kunal Shailesh	Bharatiya Janata Party
101	26	GhorpadePeth-Gurwarpeth-Samta Bhoomi	A	Ganesh Bugaji Kalyankar	Nationalist Congress Party
102	26	GhorpadePeth-Gurwarpeth-Samta Bhoomi	B	Malwade Sneha Namdev	Bharatiya Janata Party
103	26	GhorpadePeth-Gurwarpeth-Samta Bhoomi	C	Aishwarya Samrat Thorat	Bharatiya Janata Party
104	26	GhorpadePeth-Gurwarpeth-Samta Bhoomi	D	Ajay Appasaheb Khedekar	Bharatiya Janata Party
105	27	Navi Peth- Parvati	A	Mahesh (Amar) Vilas Awale	Bharatiya Janata Party
106	27	Navi Peth- Parvati	B	Smita Vaste	Bharatiya Janata Party
107	27	Navi Peth- Parvati	C	Gaud Lata Raghunath	Bharatiya Janata Party
108	27	Navi Peth- Parvati	D	Shr. Dheeraj Ramachandra Ghate	Bharatiya Janata Party
109	28	Janta Vasahat-Hingane Khurd	A	Rithe Vrushali Anand	Bharatiya Janata Party
110	28	Janta Vasahat-Hingane Khurd	B	Gadade Priya Shivaji	Nationalist Congress Party
111	28	Janta Vasahat-Hingane Khurd	C	Suraj Nathuram Lokhande	Nationalist Congress Party
112	28	Janta Vasahat-Hingane Khurd	D	Adv. Prasanna (Dada) Ghanshyam Jagtap	Bharatiya Janata Party
113	29	Deccan Gymkhana-Happy Colony	A	Pande Sunil Namdev	Bharatiya Janata Party
114	29	Deccan Gymkhana-Happy Colony	B	Adv. Sawalekar Mitali Kuldeep	Bharatiya Janata Party
115	29	Deccan Gymkhana-Happy Colony	C	Khardekar Manjushree Sandeep	Bharatiya Janata Party
116	29	Deccan Gymkhana-Happy Colony	D	Joshi Puneeth Srikant	Bharatiya Janata Party
117	30	Karvenagar-Hingane Home Colony	A	Dudhane Swapnil Devaram	Nationalist Congress Party
118	30	Karvenagar-Hingane Home Colony	B	Barate Reshma Santosh	Bharatiya Janata Party
119	30	Karvenagar-Hingane Home Colony	C	Tejashree Mahesh Pawale	Bharatiya Janata Party
120	30	Karvenagar-Hingane Home Colony	D	Barate Rajesh Kisan	Bharatiya Janata Party
121	31	Mayur Colony-Kothrud	A	Mathwad Dinesh Mahadev	Bharatiya Janata Party
122	31	Mayur Colony-Kothrud	B	Jyotsna Jagannath Kulkarni	Bharatiya Janata Party
123	31	Mayur Colony-Kothrud	C	Vasanti Navnath Jadhav	Bharatiya Janata Party
124	31	Mayur Colony-Kothrud	D	Sutar Prithviraj Shashikant	Bharatiya Janata Party
125	32	Warje-Popularnagar	A	Bhosale Harshada Shantanu	Bharatiya Janata Party
126	32	Warje-Popularnagar	B	Barate Bharatbhushan Sharadchandra	Bharatiya Janata Party
127	32	Warje-Popularnagar	C	Wanjale Sayali Rameshbhai	Bharatiya Janata Party
128	32	Warje-Popularnagar	D	Dodke Sachin Shivajirao	Bharatiya Janata Party
129	33	Shivane-Khadakwasla-Dhayari	A	Dhanashree Dattatray Kolhe	Bharatiya Janata Party
130	33	Shivane-Khadakwasla-Dhayari	B	Anita Tukaram Ingle	Nationalist Congress Party (Sharadchandra Pawar)
131	33	Shivane-Khadakwasla-Dhayari	C	Nanekar Subhash Muralidhar	Bharatiya Janata Party
132	33	Shivane-Khadakwasla-Dhayari	D	Sopan (Kaka) Chavan	Nationalist Congress Party (Sharadchandra Pawar)
133	34	Vadgaon Budhruk-Dhayari	A	Charwad Haridas Krishna	Bharatiya Janata Party
134	34	Vadgaon Budhruk-Dhayari	B	Komal Sarang Navale	Bharatiya Janata Party
135	34	Vadgaon Budhruk-Dhayari	C	Jayshree Satyawan Bhumkar	Bharatiya Janata Party
136	34	Vadgaon Budhruk-Dhayari	D	Raju Murlidhar Laygude	Bharatiya Janata Party
137	35	Suncity-Manikbaug	A	Gosavi Jyoti Kishor	Bharatiya Janata Party
138	35	Suncity-Manikbaug	B	Manjusha Deepak Nagpure	Bharatiya Janata Party
139	35	Suncity-Manikbaug	C	More Sachin Raosaheb	Bharatiya Janata Party
140	35	Suncity-Manikbaug	D	Shrikant Shashikant Jagtap	Bharatiya Janata Party
141	36	Sahakarnagar-Padmavati	A	Veena Ganesh Ghosh	Bharatiya Janata Party
142	36	Sahakarnagar-Padmavati	B	Bhosale Shailaja Arun	Bharatiya Janata Party
143	36	Sahakarnagar-Padmavati	C	Sai Prashant Thopte	Bharatiya Janata Party
144	36	Sahakarnagar-Padmavati	D	Mahesh Nanasaheb Wable	Bharatiya Janata Party
145	37	Dhankawadi-Katraj Dairy	A	Balabhau (Kishor) Uttam Dhankawade	Bharatiya Janata Party
146	37	Dhankawadi-Katraj Dairy	B	Tapkir Varsha Vilas	Bharatiya Janata Party
147	37	Dhankawadi-Katraj Dairy	C	Badak Tejashree Sachin	Bharatiya Janata Party
148	37	Dhankawadi-Katraj Dairy	D	Arun Bhagwan Rajwade	Bharatiya Janata Party
149	38	Balajinagar-Ambegaon-Katraj	A	Smita Sudhir Kondhare	Nationalist Congress Party
150	38	Balajinagar-Ambegaon-Katraj	B	Beldare Sandeep Balasaheb	Bharatiya Janata Party
151	38	Balajinagar-Ambegaon-Katraj	C	Beldare Seema Yuvraj	Nationalist Congress Party
152	38	Balajinagar-Ambegaon-Katraj	D	Chorghe Pratibha Rohidas	Bharatiya Janata Party
153	38	Balajinagar-Ambegaon-Katraj	E	Khopade Vyankoji Maruti	Bharatiya Janata Party
154	39	Upper Super Indiranagar	A	Varsha Bhimrao Sathe	Bharatiya Janata Party
155	39	Upper Super Indiranagar	B	Pratik Prakash Kadam	Nationalist Congress Party
156	39	Upper Super Indiranagar	C	Dhadve Rupali Dinesh	Bharatiya Janata Party
157	39	Upper Super Indiranagar	D	Bala (Pramod) Premchand Oswal	Bharatiya Janata Party
158	40	Kondhwa Budhruk-Yeolewadi	A	Archana Amit Jagtap	Bharatiya Janata Party
159	40	Kondhwa Budhruk-Yeolewadi	B	Kamthe Vrushali Sunil	Bharatiya Janata Party
160	40	Kondhwa Budhruk-Yeolewadi	C	Kadam Tushar Puja	Bharatiya Janata Party
161	40	Kondhwa Budhruk-Yeolewadi	D	Tilekar Ranjana Kundalik	Bharatiya Janata Party
162	41	Mohammadwadi-Undri	A	Alhat Prachi Ashish	Bharatiya Janata Party
163	41	Mohammadwadi-Undri	B	Bandal Nivrutti Dnyanoba	Nationalist Congress Party
164	41	Mohammadwadi-Undri	C	Shweta Sachin Ghule	Nationalist Congress Party
165	41	Mohammadwadi-Undri	D	Tarwade Atul Narayan	Bharatiya Janata Party

== See also ==
- 2026 elections in India
- Pune Municipal Corporation
