= Deepak Mankar =

Indian politician

Deepak Mankar is a leader of Nationalist Congress Party.
