= Datta Phuge =

Indian businessman (1968–2016)

Dattatrey Phuge
- Born: 14 July 1968; Maharashtra, India
- Died: 14 July 2016 (aged 48)
- Cause of death: Beaten to death
- Occupation: Businessman
- Political party: Nationalist Congress Party
- Spouse: Seema Phuge
- Children: 1

Dattatrey D. Phuge (14 July 1968 – 14 July 2016) was an Indian businessman and millionaire. He gained fame in 2012 after having a $240,000 customized gold shirt made, earning him the nickname Gold Man, and Pimpri Goldman. Phuge was murdered by being beaten to death on the 14 July 2016 over a financial dispute.

== Career ==
Phuge ran the Vakratund Chit Fund Pvt. Ltd. along with his wife Seema Phuge, a former corporator who belonged to the Nationalist Congress Party. He also ran a co-operative credit society and financial institutions.

== Gold Shirt ==
In late 2012, Phuge had an opulent $240,000, 22-karat gold shirt made for him, decorated with seven Swarovski crystal buttons and an accompanying flashy gold belt in a matching design. In 2013, he thereby gained an entry in the Guinness Book of World Records for the most expensive shirt. In 2013 Phuge said of his love of gold that "Everybody knows me as the 'gold man' in the whole region. Other rich people spend one crore (10 million rupees) to buy Audis or Mercedes, to buy what they like. What crime have I done? I just love gold. Gold has always been my passion since a young age. I've always worn gold as jewellery in the form of bracelets, rings, chains."

== Death ==
On 14 July 2016, Phuge was murdered after being lured to an open ground in the Dighi area of Pune under the guise of a birthday celebration; he and his son had been invited via text message by one of the suspects. Upon arrival, a group of approximately twelve assailants pulled Phuge from his vehicle and attacked him with sickles, swords, knives, and rods. He was subsequently bludgeoned to death with large stones before the attackers fled the scene. Phuge's son witnessed the assault but managed to escape unharmed.

Police investigators suggested the motive was related to a dispute over financial transactions, citing reports of financial misappropriation and irregularities allegedly involving Phuge. Phuge's son stated that the killers were known associates of his father and believed they may have been contracted for the killing.

Following the discovery of his body, a manhunt was launched and roadblocks were established across the district. Nine individuals were eventually arrested, including Phuge’s nephew, while three other suspects initially avoided capture.
