= Dattatraya Yeshwant Phadke =

Indian businessman

- Known for: Tata Institute of Fundamental Research

Dattatraya Yeshwant Phadke was head of Electronics division at Tata Institute of Fundamental Research. He was also the founder of the Indian Vacuum Society.

He was awarded the Padma Bhushan, third-highest civilian honour of India by the President of India, in 1972.
