= Girish Bapat =

Indian politician (1950–2023)

- गिरीश बापट
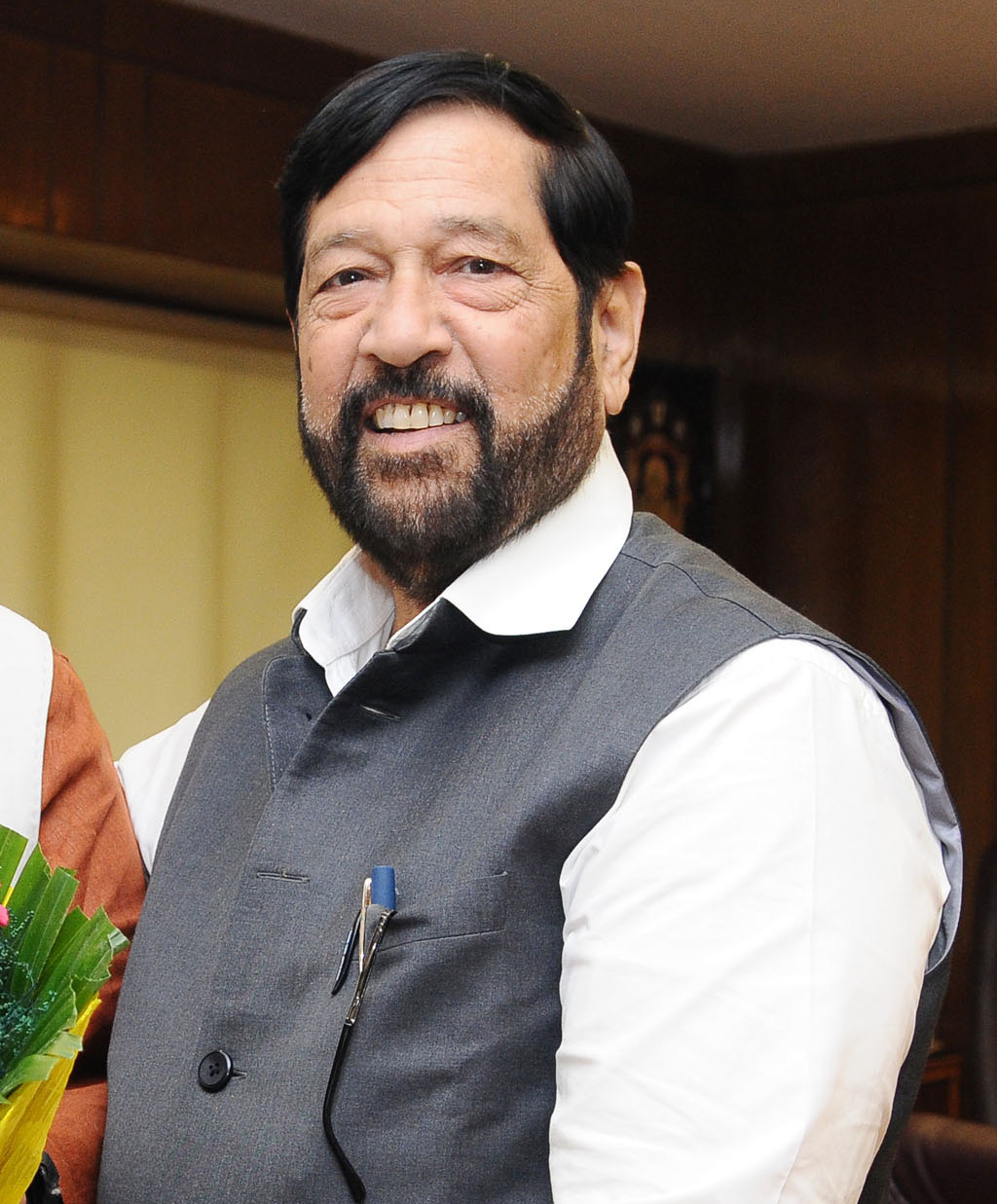
- Bapat in 2016

Member of Parliament, Lok Sabha
- In office 23 May 2019 – 29 March 2023
- Preceded by: Anil Shirole
- Succeeded by: Murlidhar Mohol
- Constituency: Pune

Minister of Food & Civil Supplies Government of Maharashtra
- In office 4 December 2014 – 4 June 2019
- Chief Minister: Devendra Fadnavis
- Succeeded by: Sambhaji Patil Nilangekar

Minister of Parliamentary Affairs Government of Maharashtra
- In office 4 December 2014 – 4 June 2019
- Chief Minister: Devendra Fadnavis
- Preceded by: Prakash Mehta

Member of Maharashtra Legislative Assembly
- In office 1995 – 23 May 2019
- Preceded by: Vasant Thorat
- Succeeded by: Mukta Tilak
- Constituency: Kasba Peth

Personal details
- Born: 3 September 1950 Talegaon, Bombay State, India
- Died: 29 March 2023 (aged 72) Pune, Maharashtra, India
- Party: Bharatiya Janata Party
- Spouse: Girija Bapat
- Children: 1 son
- Parents: Balchandra Bapat (father); Pratibha Bapat (mother)
- Education: Bachelor of Commerce
- Alma mater: Brihan Maharashtra College of Commerce
- Occupation: Politician
- Website: www.mahabjp.org/Eng/BjpBadal/Cabinet.aspx

Girish Bapat (3 September 1950 – 29 March 2023) was an Indian politician who served as a member of Parliament in the 17th Lok Sabha. He was elected to the Lok Sabha, lower house of the Parliament of India from Pune, Maharashtra in the 2019 Indian general election as a member of Bharatiya Janata Party. Earlier he served as the Cabinet Minister for Food, Civil Supplies and Consumer Protection, Food and Drugs Administration and Parliamentary Affairs in the First Fadnavis ministry. He was a member of 13th Maharashtra Legislative Assembly and one of the top Bharatiya Janata Party leaders in Vidhan Sabha. He was elected from Kasba Peth constituency to the Vidhan Sabha in five consecutive elections since 1995.

== Political career ==
Bapat started his public career working initially with the Rashtriya Swayamsevak Sangh. He was appointed secretary of Pune City BJP in 1980. He was first elected to the Pune Municipal Corporation in a by-election in 1983 and won three subsequent terms. He was appointed the Standing Committee chairman of Pune Municipal Corporation in 1986–87. He was first elected as a member of Maharashtra Legislative Assembly in 1995. In 1997, he was appointed director of Krishna Valley Development Corporation. In the 2019 Indian general elections, he was elected to the Lok Sabha from Pune constituency.

== Positions held ==
=== Within BJP ===
- Secretary, BJYM Pune (1980)
- President, BJP Pune (2006)

=== Legislative ===
- Member, Maharashtra Legislative Assembly – five consecutive terms since 1995
- Member, Lok Sabha (2019–2023)
- Chairman, Pune Municipal Corporation Standing Committee (1986–87)

== Controversies ==
Bapat had been criticised for poor judgment and misuse of office.

== Death ==
Bapat died in Shaniwar Peth, Pune at the age of 72 after a long illness.

Political offices
Preceded by Anil Deshmukh	Cabinet Minister for Food & Civil Supplies, Maharashtra State; 31 October 2014 – 4 June 2019	Succeeded by Sambhaji Patil Nilangekar
Preceded by Manohar Naik	Cabinet Minister for Food & Drug Administration, Maharashtra State; 31 October 2014 – 4 June 2019	Succeeded by N/A
Preceded by Ajit Pawar	Maharashtra State Guardian Minister for Pune district December 2014 – 4 June 2019	Succeeded by N/A
