= Mukta Tilak =

Indian politician (1965–2022)

Member of Maharashtra Legislative Assembly
- In office 2019–2022
- Preceded by: Girish Bapat
- Succeeded by: Ravindra Dhangekar
- Constituency: Kasba Peth

Mayor of Pune
- In office March 2017 – November 2019
- Preceded by: Dattatray Dhankawade
- Succeeded by: Murlidhar Mohol

Personal details
- Born: 17 August 1965 Gwalior, Madhya Pradesh, India
- Died: 22 December 2022 (aged 57) Pune, Maharashtra, India
- Party: Bhartiya Janta Party
- Spouse: Shailesh Tilak

Mukta Tilak (17 August 1965 – 22 December 2022) was an Indian politician. She was elected to the Maharashtra Legislative Assembly from Kasba Peth in the 2019 state elections as a member of Bharatiya Janata Party.

Tilak was elected Mayor of Pune for the period 2017 to 2019. Tilak was the first member of the BJP to hold the Mayor's position. She died due to cancer in Pune on 22 December 2022.

== Personal life and death ==
Mukta Tilak was the daughter-in-law (niece-in-law) of Jayantrao Tilak, who was Bal Gangadhar Tilak's grandson. Her husband Shailesh Tilak is also associated with BJP.

Tilak died of cancer on 22 December 2022, at the age of 57. Her death was condoled by Indian Prime Minister Narendra Modi.
