= Fursungi =

Town in Maharashtra, India

Fursungi Phursungi
- Town
- Location within Maharashtra Location within India
- Coordinates: 18°28′13″N 73°58′33″E
- Country: India
- State: Maharashtra
- District: Pune
- Taluka: Haveli

Government
  - Type: Sarpanch

Area
  - Total: 17.58 km^{2} (6.79 sq mi)
- Elevation: 573 m (1,880 ft)

Population (2011)
  - Total: 66,062
  - Density: 3,758/km^{2} (9,733/sq mi)
- Time zone: UTC+5:30 (IST)
- PIN: 242407

Fursungi, or Phursungi, is a town in Haveli Taluka, Pune District, Maharashtra, India. It is located south of the Mula-Mutha River, approximately 13 kilometres east of the district capital, Pune, and 9 kilometres southeast of the taluka seat, Haveli. Like other settlements in this area, Fursungi is under the administration of Pune Municipal Corporation. As of the end of 2011, it is home to 66,062 inhabitants.

== Geography ==
Fursungi is located in the western portion of Pune District and is connected to National Highway 548DD. Its average elevation is at 573 metres above the sea level.

== Demographics ==
In the year 2011, Fursungi has 15,595 households. Among the 66,062 residents, 34,739 are male and 31,323 are female. The total literacy rate of the town is 76.24%, with 27,602 of the male population and 22,763 of the female population being literate. The town's census location code is 556292.
