= Datta Ekbote =

Indian politician and workers rights activist (c.1936–2020)

Dattatraya Ekbote
- Born: 1936 (age 89–90)
- Occupation: Politician

Dattatraya Ekbote, known popularly as Datta Ekbote (c. 1936 – 2 September 2020), was an Indian workers' rights activist, politician and former Mayor of Pune, the second largest city in Maharashtra (after Mumbai) and the eighth largest city in India. Ekbote was a longtime, vocal activist for workers' rights, especially in India's beedi industry. The beedi, or bidi, is a type of cigarette popular in India.

Ekbote grew up in extreme poverty to become a prominent labor rights activist and politician. He was the former Maharashtra State Vice President of the Samajwadi Party. He was also a member of the Janata Party and, later in his career, the Nationalist Congress Party (NCP).

In August 2020, Ekbote began exhibiting symptoms of COVID-19 during the COVID-19 pandemic in India and tested positive for the virus. He and his family tried to have him admitted to intensive care units of several private hospitals in Pune, but they were unable to find an available hospital bed or an ambulance for emergency treatment. Local officials had to appeal to Maharashtra state officials in order to finally secure his admission to a public medical centre, Sassoon Hospital, where he reportedly did not receive proper treatment.

Ekbote died from COVID-19 at Sassoon Hospital in Pune at 12:30 a.m. on 2 September 2020, at the age of 84. Ekbote's 45-year-old son, Ravindra or "Ravi", also died from COVID-19 on 31 August 2020, after testing positive for the coronavirus. The former mayor was survived by his wife, their two daughters, and a grandson. He was cremated at Kailas Cemetery in Koregaon Park.

Ekbote's death drew attention to the lack of medical infrastructure to deal with the COVID-19 pandemic in Pune. Ekbote died just days after the death of local television reporter, Pandurang Raikar, who also died because he was unable to secure a bed or ventilator in an intensive care unit, just like Ekbote.
