= Pune Municipal Corporation =

Local governing body of Pune

Pune Municipal Corporation Puṇe Mahānagarpālikā
- Emblem of Pune Municipal Corporation

Type
- Type: Municipal Corporation

History
- Founded: 15 February 1950; 76 years ago
- Preceded by: Pune Municipal Council (1857–1950)

Leadership
- Municipal Commissioner & Administrator: Naval Kishore Ram, IAS
- Mayor: Manjusha Nagpure BJP
- Deputy Mayor: Parshuram Wadekar, RPI(A)

Structure
- Seats: 165
- Political groups: Government (119): BJP (119); Opposition (46): NCP (26); INC (15); NCP-SP (3); SS(UBT) (1); IND (1)
- Committees: Standing Committee; Ward Committees (15); Law Committee; City Development Committee; Women and Child Welfare Committee; Sports Committee

Elections
- Voting system: First-past-the-post voting
- First election: 1952
- Last election: 15 January 2026
- Next election: 2031

Motto
- Varam janahitam dhyeyama (IAST) "For welfare of the public"

Meeting place
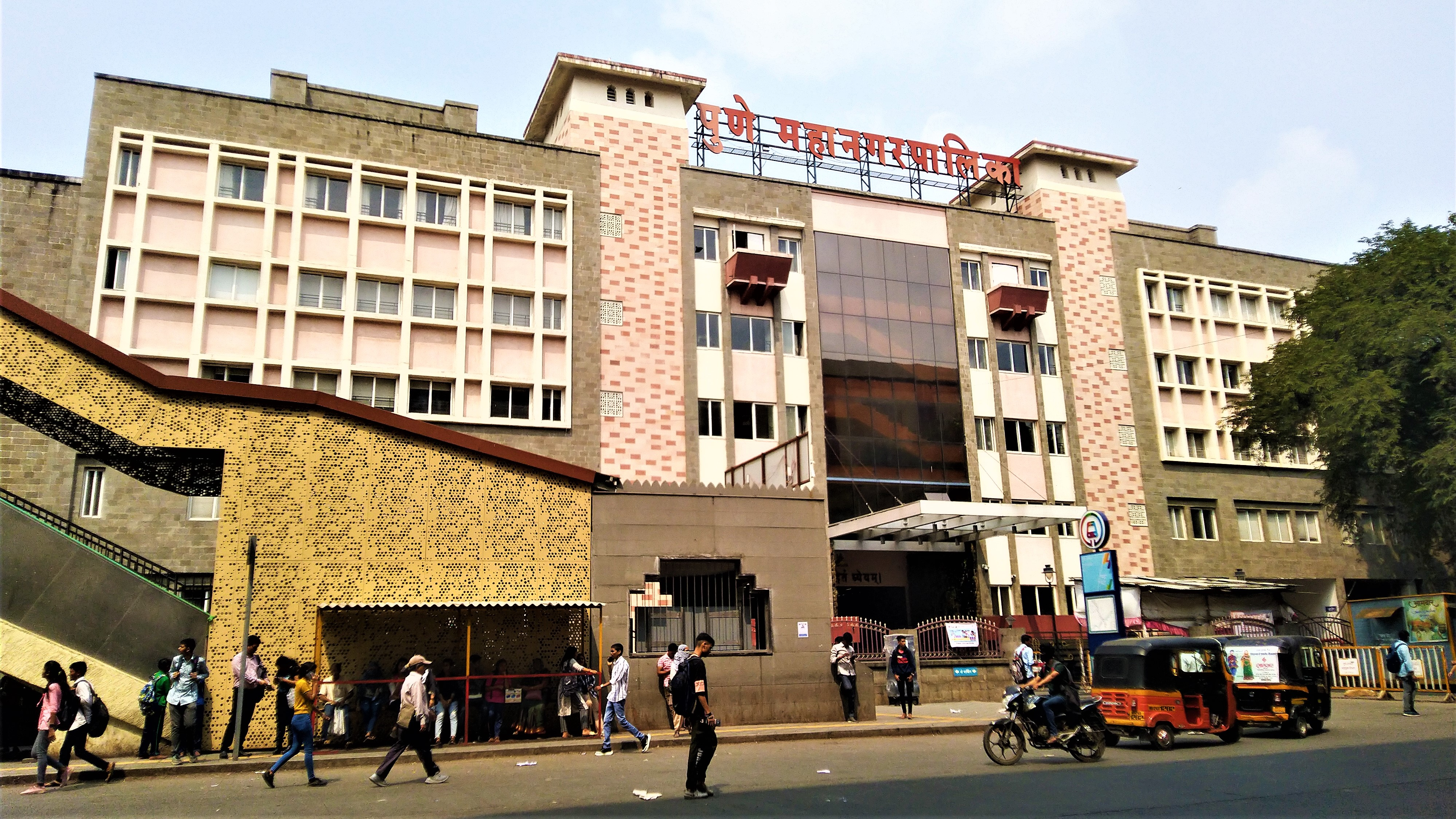
- PMC Building, Shivajinagar, Pune

Website
- pmc.gov.in/en

Pune Municipal Corporation (PMC) is the civic body that governs the city of Pune, situated in the state of Maharashtra, India.

Established on 15 February 1950, the executive power of the PMC is vested in the Municipal Commissioner, an Indian Administrative Service (IAS) officer appointed by the Government of Maharashtra. The position is held by Naval Kishor Ram, IAS. Manjusha Nagpure from BJP was elected as the mayor and Parshuram Wadekar from RPI(A) as the deputy mayor in February 2026.

== Jurisdiction ==
The city comes under the Pune district, Maharashtra. The Collector is in charge of property records and revenue collection for the Central government. Appointed by the State government, the Collector also functions as the election officer and conducts general as well as state elections in the city. The Pune City Police is the law enforcement agency in the city and answers to the Ministry of Home Affairs of the Government of Maharashtra.It is headed by a Police Commissioner, an Indian Police Service (IPS) officer.

In July 2017, eleven villages surrounding the city were merged in PMC bringing an additional area of 80.7 sq. km. and a population of 278,000 under the civic body's jurisdiction. PMC now governs a total area of 331.26 sq. km. The merged villages include: Uruli Devachi, Phursungi, Bavdhan Budruk, Lohegaon (remaining), Hadapsar (Sadesatra Nali), Mundhwa (Keshavnagar area), Shivane (remaining), Dhayari (remaining), Undri, Ambegaon Khurda and Ambegaon Budruk. This merger was preceded by the merger of 23 villages in 1997.

On 23 December 2020, the state government issued a draft notification for the merger of 23 adjoining villages within PMC limits, namely Mhalunge, Sus, Bavdhan Budruk, Kirkatwadi, Pisoli, Kondhwe-Dhawade, Kopre, Nanded, Khadakwasla, Manjari Budruk, Narhe, Holkarwadi, Autade-Handewadi, Wadachiwadi, Shewalewadi, Nandoshi, Sanasnagar, Mangdewadi, Bhilarewadi, Gujar Nimbalkarwadi, Jambhulwadi, Kolewadi and Wagholi. The total area of the PMC would be around 485 sq km, making it the municipal corporation with the largest area in the state.

In Sept 2024, Uruli Devachi-Phursungi went through a demerger process after many residents raised the demand.

The PMC has introduced e-Governance services for citizens. Persistent Systems as contributed to developing the system as part of its corporate social responsibility programme. A public-private partnership is perceived to bring tremendous changes in the future.

== Administration ==
The major responsibility of PMC is to look after the civic and infrastructural needs of the citizens. The administration consists of two major branches: the executive branch headed by the Municipal Commissioner and the deliberative branch headed by the Mayor (Marathi: महापौर).

=== Executive Branch ===
The executive branch is headed by the Municipal Commissioner appointed by the State government from the Indian Administrative Service for a term not exceeding three years according to Section 36 of the Maharashtra Municipal Corporation Act, 1949. Additional Municipal Commissioner(s) assist the Municipal Commissioner in the administration of the departments deputed to them. As of April 2018, there are three Additional Commissioners supervising the general, special and estate administration of the city. Each of these categories consists of several departments. The Municipal Commissioner also serves on the boards of directors of the two public transport companies, PMPML and MahaMetro.

==== Administrative Zones ====
For the convenience of administration, the city is divided into five zones each headed by a Deputy Municipal Commissioner. Each zone consists of three ward offices (Marathi: क्षेत्रिय कार्यालय, IAST: Kṣhetriya Kāryālay) overseen by an Assistant Municipal Commissioner. A ward office typically has jurisdiction over more than one election ward. Ward offices not only coordinate major civic projects in their respective areas but also deal with minor works such as maintenance and repair. Residents can avail municipal services at their local ward office eliminating the need to visit the PMC headquarters.

=== Deliberative Branch ===
The deliberative branch is the elected branch of the PMC headed by the Mayor. The city is divided into 41 multi-member wards (Marathi: प्रभाग, IAST: Prabhāg), 40 of which are represented by four corporators each while 1(Ward No.: 38) is represented by five corporators each. Thus, the general body of the PMC consists of 165 corporators. They are elected for a five year term by adult franchise in municipal elections. All major political parties active in the state contest the elections.

The corporators elect the Mayor, a ceremonial position with limited duties who acts as an ambassador and representative of the city, as well as a Deputy Mayor. The corporators approve the city budget and act as watchdogs on implementation of policy by the staff under the Municipal Commissioner.

==== Committees ====
The corporators form several committees which deliberate on various issues. At present, PMC has the following subject committees: Law, City Development, Women and Child Welfare, and Sports. The Standing Committee is the perhaps the most important committee of the PMC formed according to Section 20 of Maharashtra Municipal Corporation Act, 1949. It consists of 16 members headed by a President appointed at the first meeting of the newly elected Corporation, half of whom retire every succeeding year. A new President is also appointed every year. The Standing Committee along with 15 ward committees are together responsible for financial approvals.

City Officials
Title	Incumbent	Since	Appointed/Elected	References
Municipal Commissioner	Naval Kishore Ram, IAS	31st May 2025	Appointed by the GoM	
Commissioner of Police	Amitesh Kumar, IPS	January 2024	Appointed by the GoM	
Mayor	Manjusha Nagpure (BJP)	February 2026	Elected	
Deputy Mayor	Parshuram Wadekar (BJP)	February 2026	Elected	
Leader of the House	Ganesh Bidkar (BJP)	Dec 2020	Elected	
President of the Standing Committee	Hemant Rasane (BJP)	March 2020	Elected	

== Revenue sources ==
The following are the Income sources for the Corporation from the Central and State Government.

=== Revenue from taxes ===
Following is the Tax related revenue for the corporation.

- Property tax
- Profession tax
- Entertainment tax
- Grants from Central and State Government like Goods and Services Tax
- Advertisement tax

=== Revenue from non-tax sources ===
Following is the Non Tax related revenue for the corporation.

- Water usage charges
- Fees from Documentation services
- Rent received from municipal property
- Funds from municipal bonds

== Municipal elections ==
=== 2012 ===
Municipal elections were held on 16 February 2012 to elect a total of 152 councillors in 76 wards (2 per ward). Vaishali Bankar (NCP) and Deepak Mankar (Congress) were elected as the Mayor and Deputy Mayor respectively.

=== 2017 ===
Municipal Elections were held on 21 February 2017 to elect a total of 162 councillors in 41 wards. The BJP won an absolute majority in the 2017 elections, marking the first time the city got a mayor from the party. Mukta Tilak (BJP) was elected as the mayor and Navanth Kamble (RPI (A)) as the deputy mayor by the newly elected general body in March 2017. Tilak is the first member of the BJP to hold the position. Following Kamble's death while in office, Siddharth Dhende of the RPI (A) was elected as the deputy mayor in June 2017.

==== Bypolls ====
The demise of the Deputy Mayor Navnath Kamble (RPI (A)) in May 2017 necessitated by-elections in the Koregaon Park-Ghorpadi ward. The RPI (A) retained the seat with Himali Kamble elected as the new councillor. Another round of bypolls was held on 4 April 2018 following the death of ex-mayor Chanchala Kodre NCP, who was elected in 2017 from the Mundhwa-Magarpatta ward. NCP retained the seat and Puja Kodre was elected as the new councillor.

=== 2026 ===
Municipal elections were on 15 January 2026 to elect a total of 165 councillors in 41 wards. The BJP won a landslide victory securring 119 seats. Manjusha Nagpure of BJP was elected as the mayor. Parshuram Wadekar of RPI(A) was elected as deputy mayor.

== See also ==
- Pimpri-Chinchwad Municipal Corporation
- Pune Cantonment Board
