= List of Brahmins =

List of notable people who belong to the Brahmin caste

This is a list of notable people who belong to the Hindu Brahmin caste.

== Artist ==
- Kattingeri Krishna Hebbar, artist
- M. V. Dhurandhar, Indian artist known for his postcard arts
- Ravishankar Raval, Indian artist
- S.Rajam, Indian artist and Carnatic musician. He is the older brother of Tamil film director and musician S. Balachander and actress S. Jayalakshmi
- Y.G. Srimati, Indian artist whose painting figures were Hindu mythology and her style was influenced by Nandalal Bose & frescoes of the Ajanta Caves

== Bureaucrats ==
- Brajesh Mishra, India's first National Security advisor, Indian diplomat for Indian Foreign Service and Prime Minister Atal Bihari Vajpayee's principal secretary
- Dhanvanthi Rama Rau, founder and former president of Family Planning Association India
- Durga Prasad Dhar, Indian diplomat who was the Ambassador of India to the Soviet Union, minister in Government of J&K and India
- Hemant Karkare, Indian Police Service who was the chief of Mumbai Anti-Terrorist Squad
- Mannem Nageswara Rao, former-interim director officer Central Bureau of Investigation
- Mokshagundam Visvesvarayya, Indian civil engineer and Diwan of Mysore.He was the chief engineer of Krishna Raja Sagara dam. He is considered "Father of Indian Civil Engineering"
- P. N. Dhar, Indian economist who was the head of Indira Gandhi's secretariat and one of her closest advisers
- P. N. Haksar, first Principal Secretary to the Prime Minister of India (1971–1973) and deputy chairman of the Planning Commission (1975–1977). He was the first chancellor of Jawaharlal Nehru University
- P. V. Gopalan, Indian bureaucrat who served as director of relief measures & refugees in the government of Zambia, advisor to 1st president of Zambia Kenneth Kaunda and as Joint Secretary to the Government of India. He is the grandfather of Kamala Harris
- Ravindra Kaushik, Spy & RAW operative famously known as Black Tiger, He is regarded as India's greatest spy to be engaged in Undercover operation at Pakistan Armed Forces
- R. N. Kao, Indian spymaster and the first founder chief of India's external intelligence agency Research and Analysis Wing.
- Satyendra Dubey, IES officer and was the project director in the National Highways Authority of India at Koderma
- Sukumar Sen, Indian civil servant who was the first Chief Election Commissioner of India & first Chief Election Commissioner in Sudan
- Suresh Tendulkar, Indian economist and former chief of the National Statistical Commission. He was a member of Prime Minister Manmohan Singh's Economic Advisory Council
- T. N. Seshan, Indian bureaucrat who was the 10th Chief Election Commissioner of India & 18th Cabinet Secretary of India
- Vijay Lakshmi Pandit, Indian diplomat who was the first female governor of Maharashtra and first female president of the United Nations General Assembly
- V. K. R. V. Rao, Indian economist and educator who founded the Delhi School of Economics

== Business ==
- Dwarkanath Tagore, first Indian industrialists to form an enterprise with British partners. He is the founder of Carr, Tagore and Company.
- Vijay Shekhar Sharma born 15 July 1978) is an Indian technology entrepreneur and billionaire businessman. He is the chairman, managing director and CEO of One97 Communications and its consumer brand Paytm.
- Indra Nooyi, Indian-American business executive and former CEO of PepsiCo
- Sheela Gautam, founder and owner of Sheela Foam Limited. She was the Member of Parliament (June 1991 – May 2004).
- S. Kasturi Ranga Iyengar was a lawyer, Indian Independence activist and managing director of The Hindu
- Rakesh Shukla (animal welfare activist), is a Bangalore-based entrepreneur, motivational speaker, and animal welfare activist who runs a home for over 700 rescued dogs.
- S. S. Vasan, founder of the Tamil-language magazine Ananda Vikatan and the film production company Gemini Studios
- T. T. Krishnamachari, founder of TTK group and Prestige. He also served as finance minister (1956–1966) and founded NCAER.
- T. V. Ramasubbaiyer, Indian philanthropist & Founder of the popular Tamil daily newspaper Dinamalar
- T. V. Sundaram Iyengar, founder of TVS Co

== Dancers ==
- Rekha Raju, Indian dancer who was specialised in both Bharatnatyam and Mohiniyattam
- Rukmini Devi, Indian Classical Dancer who catalysed the renaissance of Bharatanatyam dance. She was the first woman in Indian to be nominated as member of the Rajya Sabha. She received Padma Bhushan
- Sitara Devi, eminent Indian dancer of classical Kathak style. She received Padma Shri
- Uday Shankar, Indian dancer who is considered as Pioneer of Modern Dance in India. He received Padma Vibhushan
- Vempati Chinna Satyam, Indian dancer who was the guru of the Kuchipudi dance form. He received Padma Bhushan

== Film industry ==
=== Actors ===
- Anoop Kumar, Indian actor
- Anupam Kher, Indian actor
- Ashok Kumar, Indian actor, Dadasaheb Phalke Awardee.
- Atul Agnihotri, Indian Hindi film actor
- Crazy Mohan, Indian actor and comedian
- Dharmavarapu Subramanyam, Indian actor and comedian
- Jayaram, Indian actor who received Padma Shri
- Jeevan
- Major Sundarrajan
- Manoj Bajpayee, Indian actor who received Padma Shri
- Mohit Raina
- Paresh Rawal, Indian actor
- Raaj Kumar, Indian film actor who acted in Oscar nominated movie Mother India.
- R. Madhavan, Indian actor, director and producer
- Sanjeev Kumar, Indian actor who is the seventh greatest actor of Indian cinema of all time in a poll conducted by Rediff.com
- Sharman Joshi
- Shankar Nag
- Sidharth Shukla
- Sunil Dutt, Indian actor and politician
- Uday Kiran
- Unnikrishnan Namboothiri
- Y. V. Rao

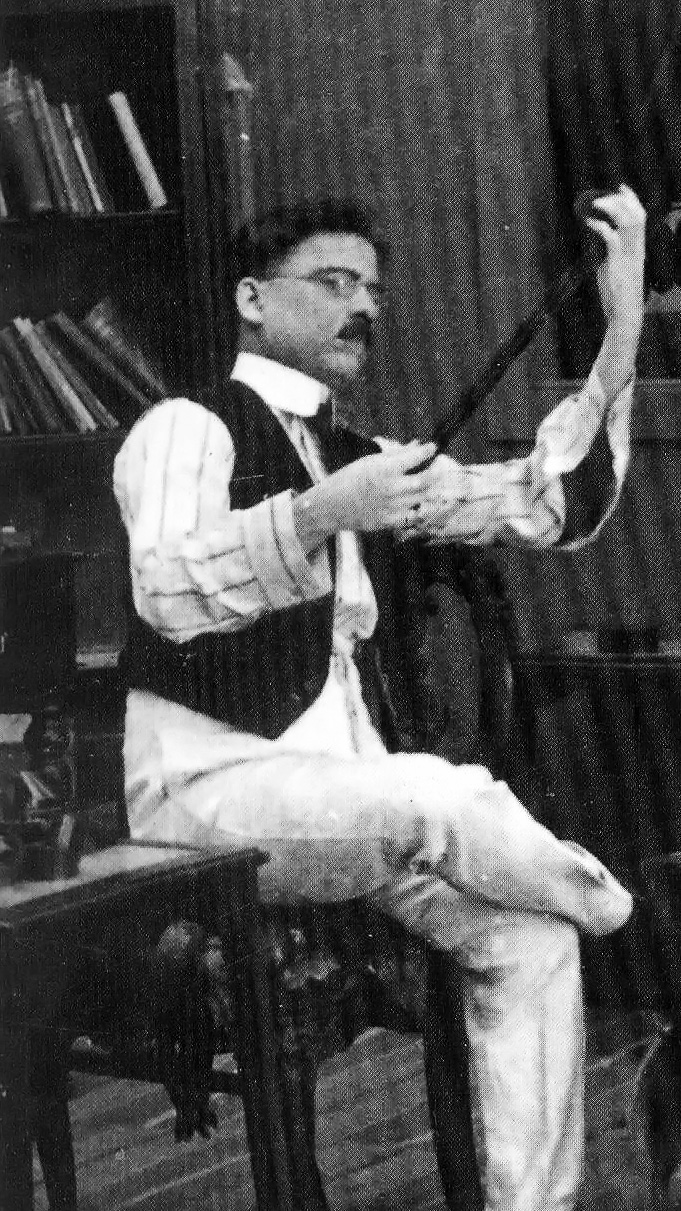
Dadasaheb Phalke

=== Directors, cinematographers and producers ===
- B. V. Karanth, film director who received Padma shri
- Dadasaheb Phalke, producer and Father of Indian Cinema.Dadasaheb Phalke Award named after him for lifetime contribution to cinema and is the highest official recognition for film personalities in the country
- Girish Karnad, film director who received India's top literary prize, the Jnanpith Award, Padma Shri in 1974 and Padma Bhushan in 1992
- G. V. Iyer, Indian film director called "Kannada Bheeshma" who was the only person who made films in Sanskrit
- Hrishikesh Mukherjee, film director who received Golden Bear, Padma Vibhushan, NTR National Award and DadaSaheb Phalke Award. Chairman of the CBFC and NFDC
- K. Viswanath, film director. Recipient of Padma Shri, Raghupathi Venkaiah Award, and Dadasaheb Phalke Award
- K. Balachander, filmmaker who is called Iyakkunar Sigaram (Director Paramount). He received Padma Shri and DadaSaheb Phalke Award
- Kidar Sharma, Indian film director
- K. Subramanyam, Indian film director
- Nanabhai Bhatt, film director and producer who was the first to feature twins in Indian cinema & Patriarch of Bhatt Film Family.
- Puttanna Kanagal, Kannada film director. Puttanna Kanangal Award was named after his contribution
- Vivek Agnihotri, film director
- V. K. Murthy, first cinematographer to be chosen for the Dadasaheb Phalke Award.

=== Actress ===
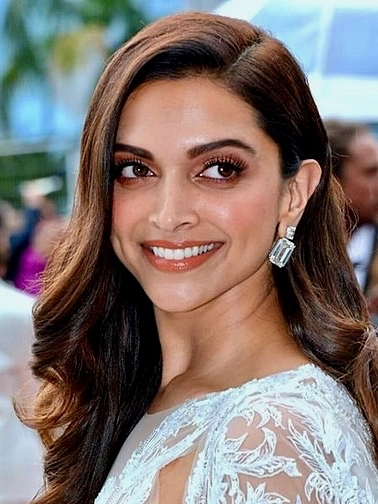
Deepika Padukone

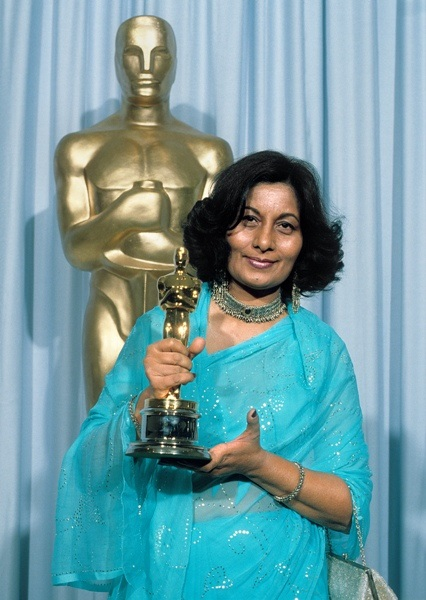
Bhanu Athaiya

- Adah Sharma
- Deepika Padukone
- Divyanka Tripathi, Indian television actress
- Amrita Rao, Indian actress
- Dr. Sharmila, Indian television and Film actress
- Durga bai Kamat, the first female actor in Indian cinema. She is known for being India's first heroine
- Durga Khote, Indian actress who received Padma Shri and Dadasaheb Phalke Award.
- Gayathri Raguram, Indian actress and choreographer
- Hema Malini, Indian actress who received Padma Shri
- Indraja
- Krishna Kumari
- Lakshmy Ramakrishnan
- Lavanya Tripathi
- Leela Chitnis
- Madhuri Dixit, Indian actress who received Padma Shri
- Madhuvanti Arun
- Mamta Kulkarni
- Pallavi Sharda, Indian Australian Actress
- Rashmi Gautam
- Rasika Joshi
- Shanta Apte
- Shruti Haasan
- Sobhita Dhulipala
- Soundarya
- Soundarya Sharma
- Sumitra Devi
- Trisha
- Vasundhara Das
- Vidya Balan, Indian actress who received Padma Shri
- Yami Gautam

=== Fashion models and designers ===
- Bhanu Athaiya, costume designer who was the first Indian to win Oscar award
- Kalpana Iyer, model and actress who became runner-up at Miss India 1978 and Miss World 1978 beauty pageant where she was a top 15 semi-finalist.
- Nethra Raghuraman, Indian model who won Femina Magazine Look of the Year contest 1997.
- Poonam Pandey, erotic model was one of the top 8 contestants of Gladrags 2010 and Kingfisher Calendar Girl Hunt 2011.

== Historians and scholars ==
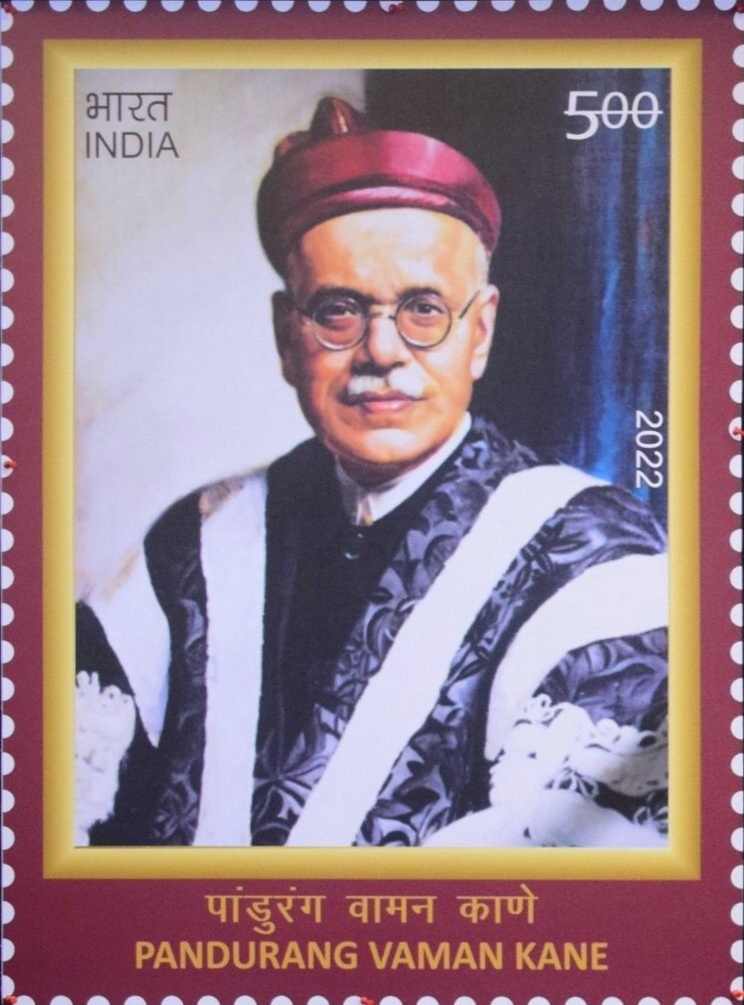
Pandurang Vaman Kane

- Datto Vaman Potdar, Indian historian and orator who was the vice-chancellor of University of Pune. He received Padma Bhushan and said to be Dr. Johnson of Maharashtra or a living encyclopaedia
- K.A. Nilakanta Sastri, Indian historian known for his works on South Indian history. He also received Padma Bhushan.
- Komarraju Venkata Lakshmana Rao, Indian historian
- Madan Mohan Malaviya, Indian scholar and educational reformer. He also received Bharat Ratna
- Natesa Sastri, polyglot, scholar in eighteen languages and authored many books in Tamil, Sanskrit and English
- Pandurang Vaman Kane, Indologist and Sanskrit scholar.He received India's highest civilian award Bharat Ratna
- Ramachandra Guha, Indian historian and writer
- S. Krishnaswami Aiyangar, Indian historian, academician and Dravidologist who earned the title "Dewan Bahadur"
- U. V. Swaminatha Iyer, Tamil Scholar called Tamil Thatha (literally, "Tamil grandfather")

== Historical figures ==
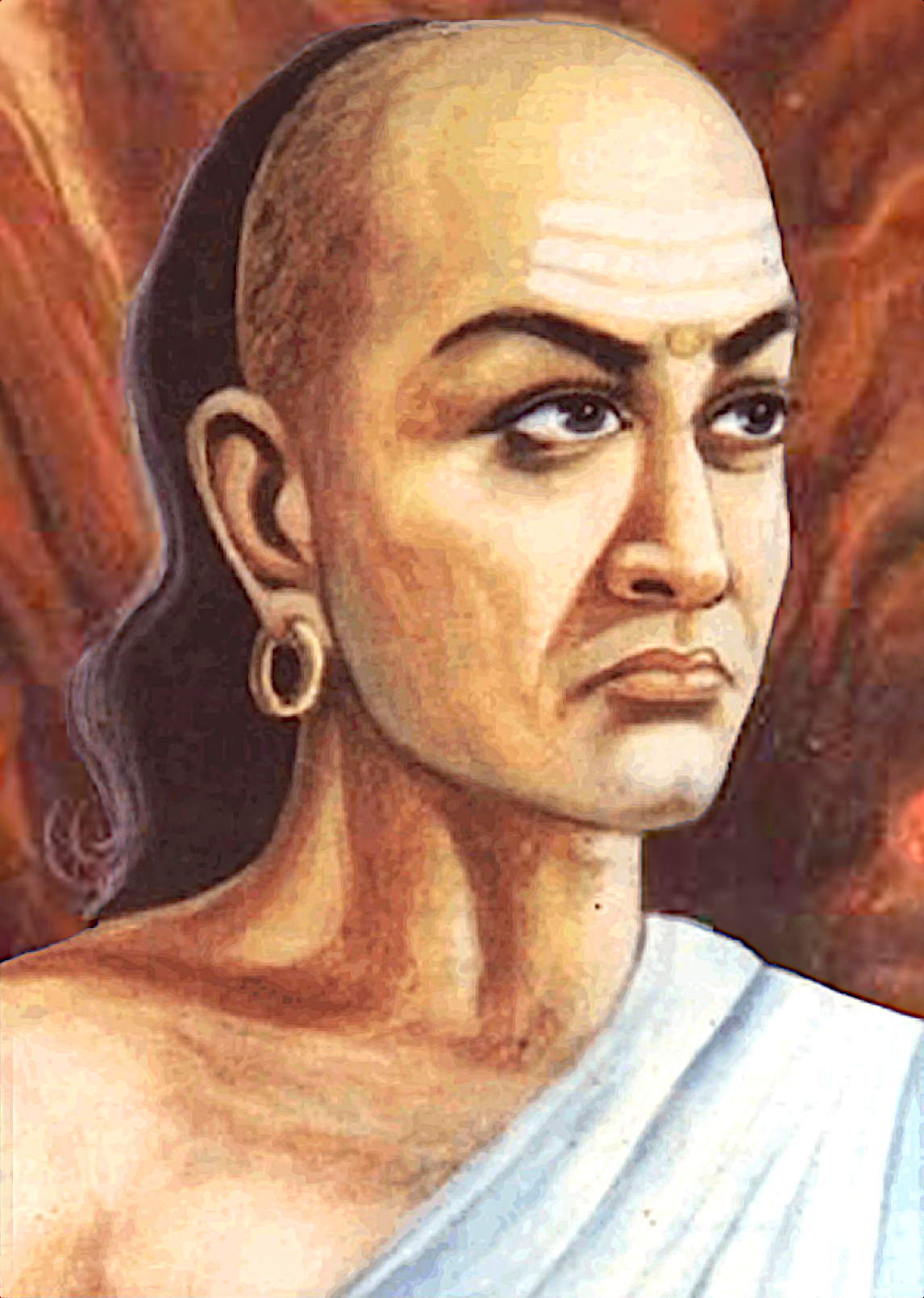
Chanakya

- Charaka an ancient Brahmin physician was one of the principal contributors to Ayurveda, a system of medicine and lifestyle developed in Ancient India.
- Sushruta was an ancient Indian physician. The Sushruta Samhita (Sushruta's Compendium), a treatise ascribed to him, is one of the most important surviving ancient treatises on medicine and is considered a foundational text of Ayurveda.
- Aryabhata (ISO: Āryabhaṭa) or Aryabhata I
- Pāṇini Since the discovery and publication of his work by European scholars in the nineteenth century, Pāṇini has been considered the "first descriptive linguist",[11] and even labelled as "the father of linguistics.
- Varahamihira, a mathematician born around 505 CE and died 587 CE, who was also known for innovation with Pascal's triangle.Varāha or Mihira, was an ancient Indian astrologer, astronomer, and polymath who lived in Ujjain (Madhya Pradesh, India). He was born at Kapitba in a Brahmin family,
- Basava, 12th-century Indian statesman, philosopher, poet, social reformer and Lingayat saint. Basava Jayanthi is celebrated after him
- Bhattadeva (1558–1638), acknowledged as the father of Assamese prose and known for Katha Bhagavat and Katha Gita
- Bhai Mati Das, martyr in Sikh history
- Bhai Sati Das, was martyred with his brother Bhai Mati Das
- Chanakya, teacher of Chandragupta Maurya and also an ancient Indian philosopher, economist, jurist and royal advisor of the Maurya Empire.
- Kaundiya, earliest disciple and follower of Gautama Buddha. He was the first to become an Arhat. Koundiny Asana was named after him
- Kumārila Bhaṭṭa, was a Hindu philosopher and a scholar of Mimamsa school of philosophy from Kamarupa (present-day Assam)
- Mohan Lal Kashmiri, Indian diplomat who played a central role in the First Anglo-Afghan War of 1838–1842
- Nana Fadnavis, Influential minister and Statesman of the Maratha Empire during the Peshwa administration.
- Samarth Ramdas, Indian Hindu saint, philosopher, poet, writer and spiritual master.
- Sariputra, main disciple and First of the Buddha's two chief disciples.
- T. Madhava Rao, Diwan of Baroda Indore and Travancore

== Indian independence movement ==
- Bagha Jatin, Indian independence activist strong man killed a tiger once and British Indian police officers many times
- Chandra Shekhar Azad, freedom fighter and an Indian revolutionary who reorganised the Hindustan Republican Association (HRA)
- Bhai Balmukund (1889 – 11 May 1915) was an Indian revolutionary freedom fighter. He was sentenced to death and hanged by the British Raj for his role in Delhi conspiracy case. He was a cousin of another revolutionary Bhai Parmanand, who was a founder member of Ghadar Party.
- Mangal Pandey, Hero of 1857 sepoy mutiny and started rebellion
- Durgawati Devi, Indian revolutionary and freedom fighter. She is best known for having accompanied Bhagat Singh on the train journey in which he made his escape in disguise after the Saunders killing
- Gopal Krishna Gokhale, political guru of Mahatma Gandhi
- Indulal Yagnik, Indian independence activist who was the leader of All India Kisan Sabha who lead the Mahagujarat movement
- Kamaladevi Chattopadhyay, Indian social reformer and freedom activist. She received Padma Bhushan, Padma Vibhushan and UNESCO honoured her with an award in 1977 for her contribution towards the promotion of handicrafts.
- Krishna Nath Sharma, freedom fighter of Assam who opened schools for Dailts.
- N. S. Hardikar, freedom fighter and founder of Rashtriya Seva Dal, a voluntary cadre based organisation.
- Pingali Venkayya, Indian freedom fighter and who designed Indian first national flag
- Jiban Ghoshal was an Indian independence activist and a member of the armed resistance movement led by Masterda Surya Sen, which carried out the Chittagong armoury raid in 1930.
- Rajendra Lahiri, Indian revolutionary who was the mastermind behind Kakori conspiracy and Dakshineshwar bombing
- Rao Dhansinghji, warrior and freedom fighter born in an Adi-gaur Brahmin family at Charkhi Dadri Haryana fought in the Battle of Nasibpur.
- Shivaram Rajguru, an Indian revolutionary from Maharashtra, known mainly for his involvement in the assassination of a British Raj police officer.
- Vanchinathan, popularly known as Vanchinathan or Vanchi, was an Indian independence activist. He is best remembered for assassinating Robert Ashe, the Tax Collector of Thirunelveli
- Subramaniya Siva
- Bapu Gokhale was army chief (Senapati) of the Marathas in the Third Anglo-Maratha War.
- Tagadur Ramachandra Rao, Indian freedom fighter and social activist
- Tatya Tope, a general in the Indian Rebellion of 1857 and one of its notable leaders.
- Jayi Rajaguru was a prominent figure of the Indian independence movement in the state of Odisha Rajaguru. He was later sentenced to death and executed in Baghitota, Midnapore.
- Vasukaka Joshi
- Bhogilal Pandya was a freedom fighter and social worker from Dungarpur in the Indian state of Rajasthan. On 3 April 1976, the Government of India awarded him the Padma Bhushan for his social services.

== Journalism ==
- Balshastri Jambhekar, Indian Journalist considered to be Father of Marathi journalism for his efforts in starting first marathi newspaper Darpan
- M. V. Kamath, Indian journalist who was the broadcasting executive and chairman of Prasar Bharati. He received Padma Bhushan
- Nidhi Razdan, Indian journalist who was the executive director of NDTV24*7
- Rahul Pandita, Indian journalist and author who was Special stories editor of The Hindu. He was also the co founder of Open Magazine
- Ramananda Chatterjee, Indian journalist who founded the Modern Review. He is considered as Father of Indian Journalism
- Rangaraj Pandey, Indian journalist who was the former editor-in-chief Thanthi TV. He is also the founder of Chanakyaa YouTube Channel

== Law ==
- B. N. Rau, Indian Judge of International Court of Justice. He played a key role in drafting the Constitution of India. He was also the president of the UN Security council and Prime minister of Jammu & Kashmir
- C. P. Ramaswami Iyer, Advocate General of Madras Presidency & Diwan of Travancore (1936–1947)
- T. Muthuswamy Iyer, first Indian to become judge of the Madras High Court
- Sambhunath Pandit, First Indian to become judge of Calcutta High Court in 1863
- Seshadri Srinivasa Iyengar, Indian lawyer who was the Advocate General of Madras Presidency
- Madhukar Narhar Chandurkar, former Chief Justice of Bombay and Madras High Court
- Mahadev Govind Ranade, Indian Judge of Bombay High court. He was one of the founder of Indian national congress & considered as "Father of Indian Economics". He received Rao Bahadur award
- Ganesh Dutt, Indian lawyer who made generous donations from his earnings & development of education in bihar
- Bijan Kumar Mukherjea, 4th Chief Justice of India
- P. B. Gajendragadkar, 7th Chief Justice of India
- Kailas Nath Wanchoo, 10th Chief Justice of India
- Y. V. Chandrachud, 16th Chief Justice of India who is the longest-serving Chief Justice in India
- Ranganath Misra, 21st Chief Justice of India and first chairman of the National Human Rights Commission of India

== Mathematicians ==
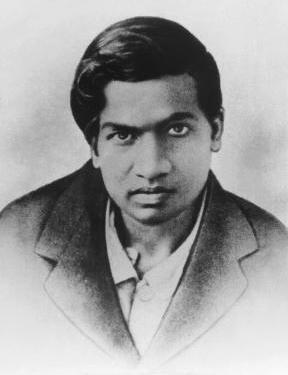
Srinivasa Ramanujan, National Mathematics Day of India is celebrated on 22 December every year to mark his birth anniversary.

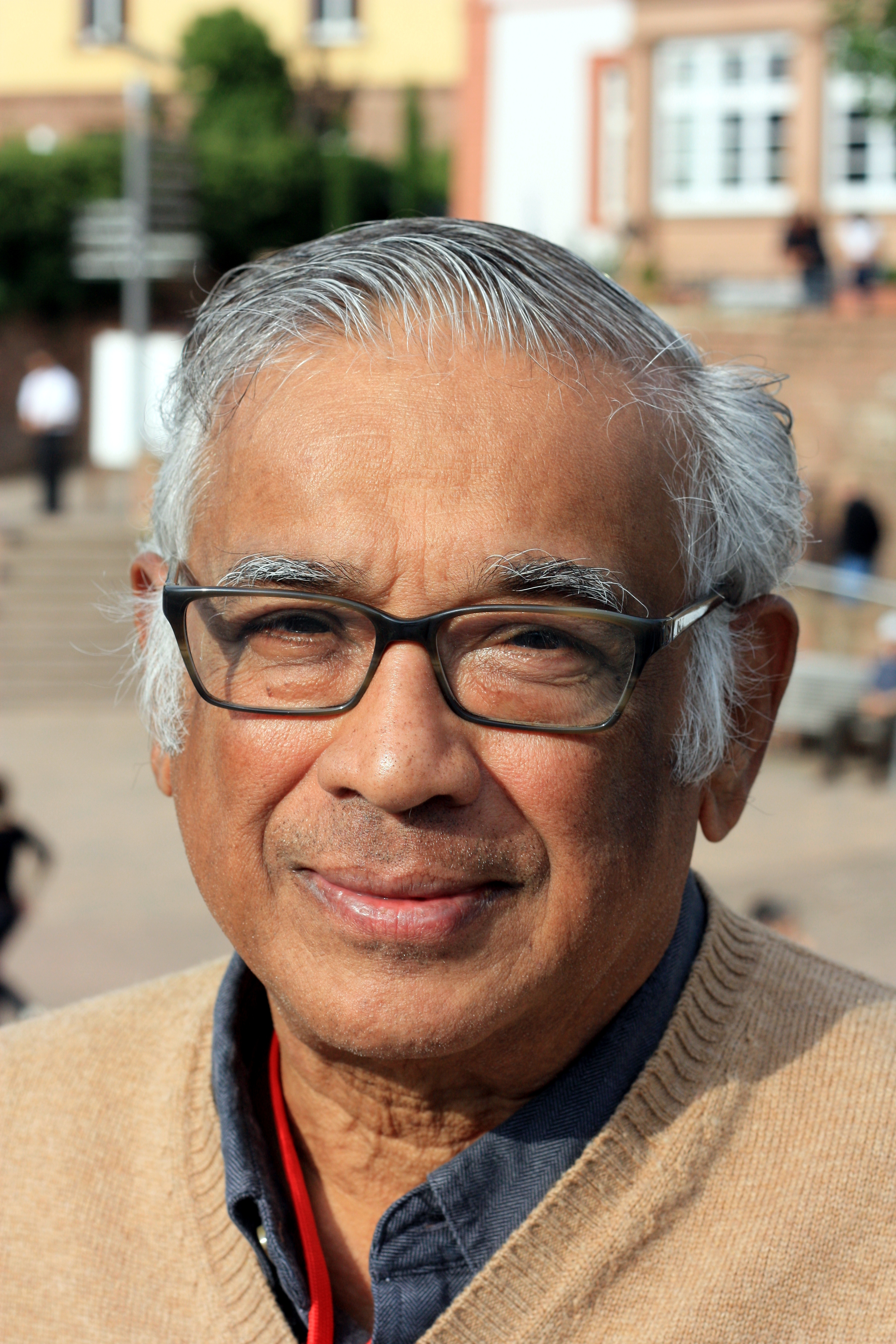
S. R. Srinivasa Varadhan winner of Abel Prize.

- A. A. Krishnaswami Ayyangar, Indian mathematician who wrote an article on the difference between Chakravala method and Continued Fractions.
- Ashutosh Mukherjee, Indian mathematician, known for his proof of the 25th proposition of Euclid's first book.
- Bapudeva Sastri, Indian mathematician who translated the Siddhānta Shiromani.
- Bhāskara II, Indian mathematician and astronomer.
- C. S. Seshadri, Indian mathematician, known for his proof of the Narasimhan–Seshadri theorem.
- Kannan Soundararajan, Indian-American mathematician, professor at Stanford.
- Kiran Kedlaya, three-time Putnam Fellow mathematician, professor at University of California, San Diego.
- K. R. Parthasarathy, Indian mathematician, a pioneer of quantum stochastic calculus and professor emeritus at the Indian Statistical Institute.
- Madhava of Sangamagrama, Indian mathematician known for discovery of power series Expansions of trigonometric Sine, Cosine and Arctangent functions Infinite series summation formulae for π.
- Nilakantha Somayaji, Indian mathematician who discussed infinite series expansions of trigonometric functions and problems of algebra and spherical geometry.
- Parameshvara Nambudiri, Indian mathematician and Astronomer who discovered Drigganita and Parameshvara circumradius formula.
- Rudranath Capildeo, mathematician and politician of Trinidad and Tobago.
- Shakuntala Devi, Indian mathematician popularly known as the "Human Computer".
- Sissa, Indian mathematician who invented Chaturanga, the Indian predecessor of chess.
- Srinivasa Ramanujan, Greatest Indian mathematician who compiled Ramanujan prime, the Ramanujan theta function, partition formulae and mock theta functions and made substantial contributions to mathematical analysis, number theory, infinite series, and continued fractions.
- S. R. Srinivasa Varadhan, Indian-American mathematician who received Abel Prize for his fundamental contributions to probability theory and in particular for creating a unified theory of large deviation.
- Varāhamihira, Indian astronomer and mathematician who discovered a version of Pascal's triangle and worked on Magic squares.

== Military ==
- Bhandari Ram VC (24 July 1919 – 19 May 2002) was an Indian recipient of the Victoria Cross, the highest and most prestigious award for gallantry in the face of the enemy.
- Somnath Sharma, first recipient of India's highest gallantry award Param Vir Chakra
- Captain Lakshmi Sahgal, Officer of the Indian National Army, and the Minister of Women's Affairs in the Azad Hind government. She received Padma Vibushan
- Commodore Kasargod Patnashetti Gopal Rao, Indian Navy officer who received Maha Vir Chakra & Vishisht Seva Medal
- Jayanto Nath Chaudhuri, 5th Chief of Army Staff of Indian Army (1962–1966). After his retirement he served as the Indian High Commissioner to Canada. He received Padma Vibhushan
- Gopal Gurunath Bewoor, 8th Chief of Army Staff (1973–1975). He received Padma Bhushan and Param Vishisht Seva Medal
- Tapishwar Narain Raina, 9th Chief of the Army Staff of Indian Army (1975–1978). He received Padma Bhushan and Maha Vir Chakra
- K. V. Krishna Rao, 11th Chief of Army Staff of Indian Army (1981–1983) and former governor of Jammu and Kahsmir, Nagaland, Manipur and Tripura.He received Param Vishisht Seva Medal
- Krishnaswamy Sundarji, 13th Chief of Army Staff of Indian Army (1986–1988) and last former British Indian Army officer to command the Indian Army. He received Param Vishisht Seva Medal.
- Vishwa Nath Sharma, 14th Chief of the Army Staff of the Indian Army (1988–1990). He received Param Vishisht Seva Medal & Ati Vishisht Seva Medal
- Bipin Chandra Joshi, 16th Chief of Army Staff of the Indian Army (1993–1994). He received Param Vishisht Seva Medal & Ati Vishisht Seva Medal

== Musicians ==
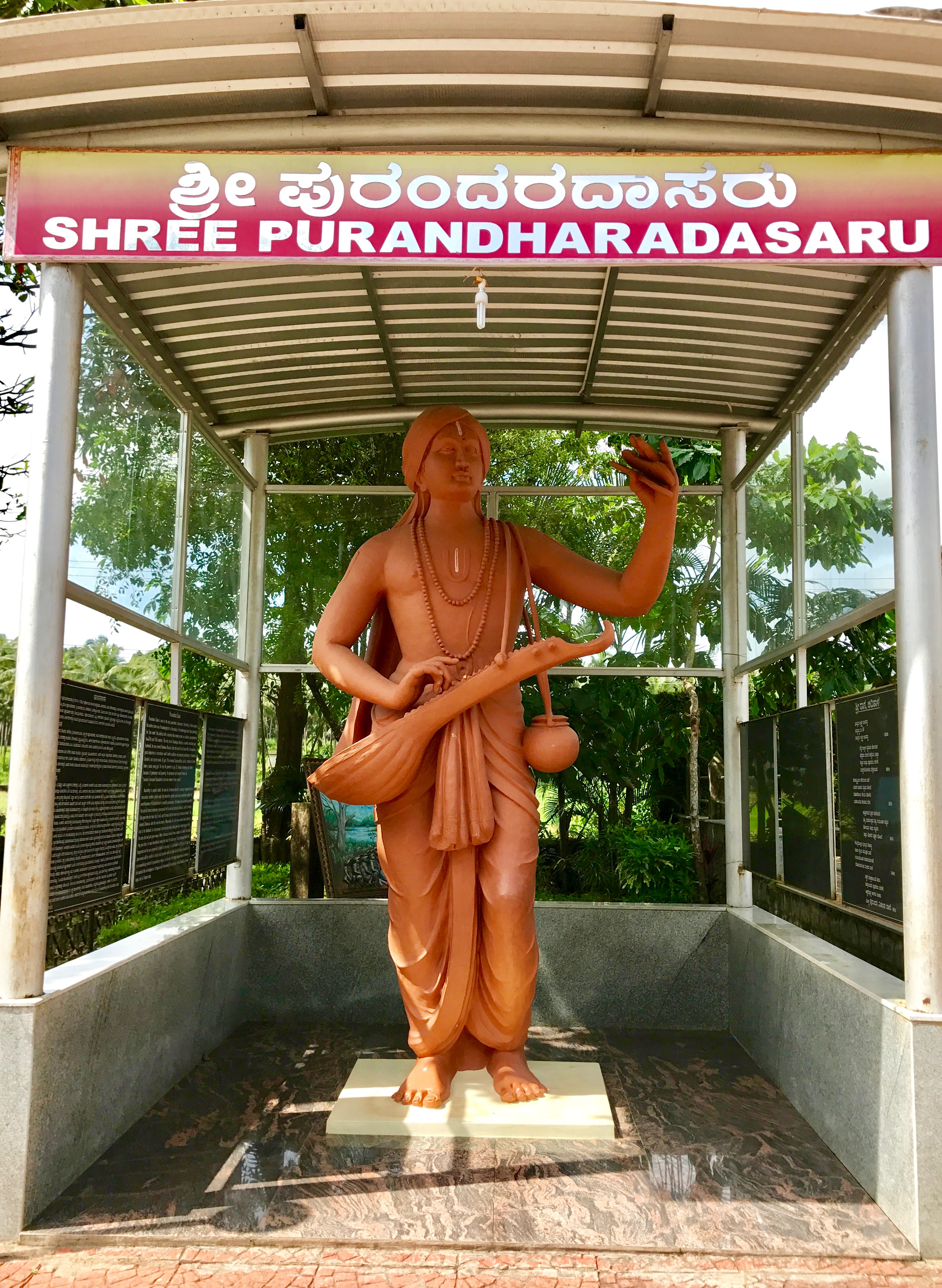
Purandara Dasa

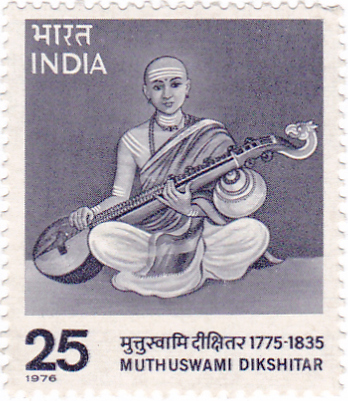
Muthuswamy Dikshitar

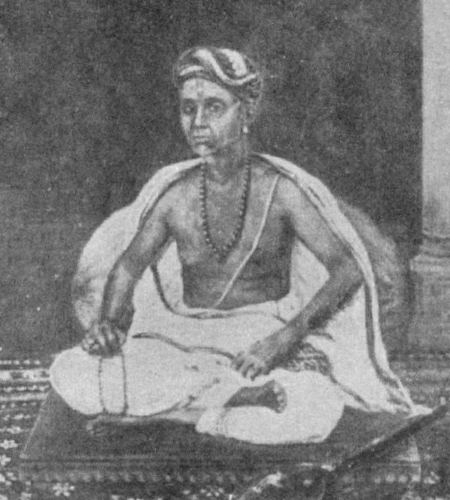
Thyagaraja

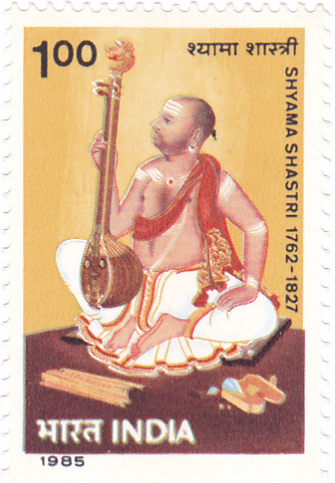
Shyama Shastri

- Bharadwaj, composer
- Bhimsen Joshi, singer
- C. Ramchandra, Indian music director and playback singer
- D. K. Pattammal, Indian Carnatic Musician who was the first woman to have performed Ragam Thanam Pallavi (male stronghold) in concerts. She has received Padma Vibhushan and Padma Bhushan
- Jasraj
- Jitendra Abhisheki, Indian vocalist who received Padma Shri
- Kalki Sadasivam, Indian singer and husband of M. S. Subbulakshmi.
- Kishore Kumar, Indian playback singer and actor
- K. V. Narayanaswamy, Indian musician and carnatic vocalist who received Padma Shri
- M. Balamuralikrishna
- Nandikeshvara, the author of the Abhinaya Darpana lit. 'The Mirror of Gesture'
- Palghat Mani Iyer
- Parassala B. Ponnammal, Indian Carnatic musician who was the first woman student at Swathi Thirunal College of Music. She has received Padma Shri.
- Ravi Shankar, Indian sitar virtuoso and a composer. He received 5 Grammy awards, Padma Bhushan, Padma Vibhushan and Bharat Ratna
- Shankar Mahadevan, singer
- Śārṅgadeva was the 13th-century Indian musicologist who authored Sangita Ratnakara
- S. P. Balasubrahmanyam, singer
- Subbudu, Indian Music and dance critic
- Tansen, Indian musician and composer who was prominent in Hindustani classical music
- Thyagaraja, composer
- T. M. Krishna, Indian Carnatic vocalist, writer, activist and author
- Udit Narayan, Indian playback singer who received Order of Gorkha Dakshina Bahu, Padma Shri and Padma Bhushan
- Vaali, Indian lyricist and poet. He received Padma Shri
- V. Dakshinamoorthy, Carnatic musician, composer and music director
- Venkataramana Bhagavathar, composer of Carnatic music
- Zubeen Garg, singer

== Nobel laureates ==
Year	Image	Laureate	Category	Comment	Citation
1913		Rabindranath Tagore	Literature	First Asian to win Nobel prize in Literature	"because of his profoundly sensitive, fresh and beautiful verse, by which, with consummate skill, he has made his poetic thought, expressed in his own English words, a part of the literature of the West."
1930		Chandrasekhara Venkata Raman	Physics	First Asian to win Nobel prize in Physics	"for his work on the scattering of light and for the discovery of the effect named after him."
2009		Venki Ramakrishnan	Chemistry	First Indian Nobel laureate in Chemistry	"for studies of the structure and function of the ribosome."
2014		Kailash Satyarthi	Peace	First Indian Nobel laureate in Peace	"for their struggle against the suppression of children and young people and for the right of all children to education."

== Poets ==
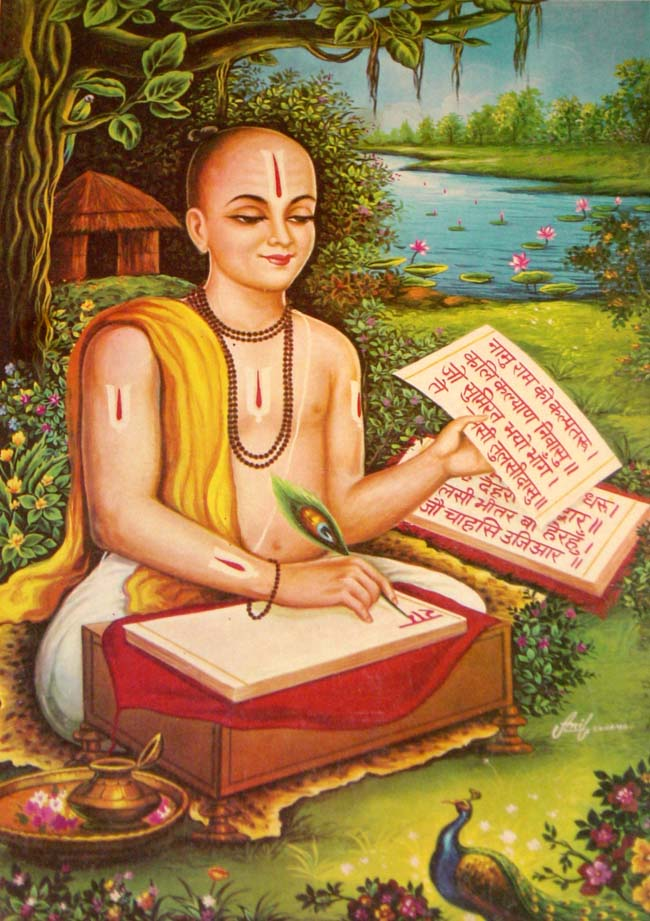
Goswami Tulsidas

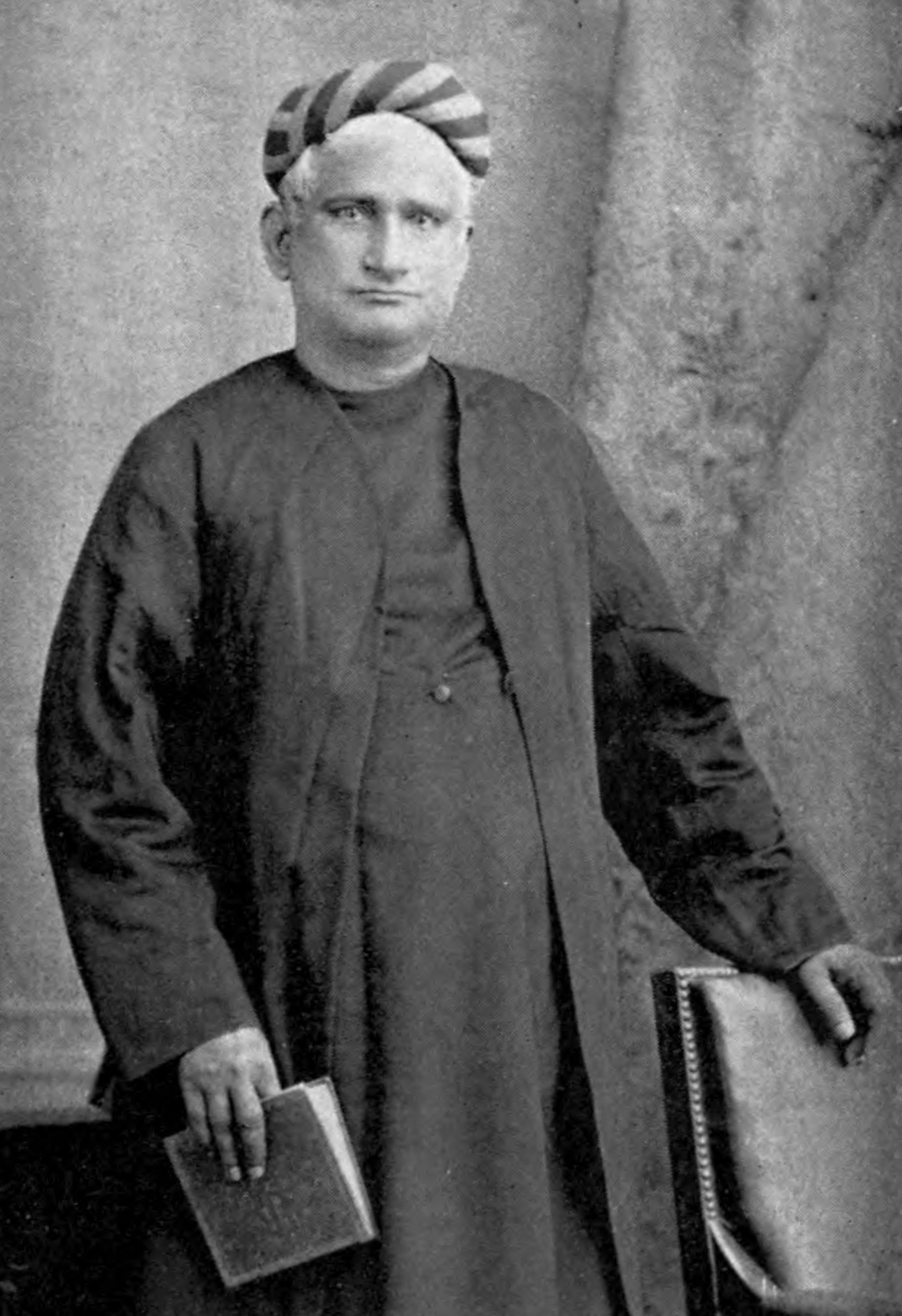
Bankim Chandra Chatterjee

- Agyeya, Indian poet and writer who received Jnanpith Award & Golden Wreath Award
- Banabhatta wrote India's first novel and was a poet in King Harsha's court
- Bankim Chandra Chattopadhyay, Indian Poet who wrote India's national song Vande Matram
- D. R. Bendre
- Garimella Satyanarayana, Telugu poet and freedom fighter
- Gopalakrishna Adiga, Kannada poet who is known as "Pioneer of New style" poetry
- Goswami Tulsidas, the author of the epic poem Ramcharitmanas.
- Jayadeva
- Kapilar, Tamil poet o Sangam period who contributed 10% of Sangam Era classical corpus
- Kavi Pradeep, Indian poet and songwriter who is best known for his patriotic song "Aye Mere Watan Ke Logo". He received Dada Saheb Phalke Award.
- M. Govinda Pai, Kannada poet who received first Rashtrakavi title by the Madras Government
- Muthuswami Dikshitar, Indian poet and composer
- Narsinh Mehta, Gujarati Saint poet who is considered as Adi Kavi. His bhajan Vaishnav Jan To was Mahatma Gandhi's favourite
- Poonthanam Nambudiri, Malayalam poet who is remembered for Jnanappana which means "the song of divine wisdom" in Malayalam
- Rajendra Bhandari, Indian Nepalese poet
- Sambandar, Tamil Shaiva Poet and who was one of the 63 Nayanars who composed 16,000 hymns
- Sri Sri, Indian poet who is known for his works in Telugu literature and anthology Maha Prasthanam
- Subramani Bharathi, Tamil poet popularly known as "Mahakavi Bharathi" ("Great Poet Bharathi"), he was a pioneer of modern Tamil poetry
- Suryakant Tripathi, Indian poet, novelist, essayist and story-writer.
- Tikkana, Telugu poet who was the second poet of the Kavi Trayam that translated Mahabharata into Telugu
- Veturi, Indian poet and lyricist
- Vidyapati, Maithili and Sanskrit poet, composer, writer, courtier and royal priest
- Viswanatha Satyanarayana, Telugu poet who has received Padma Bhushan & Jnanpith Award
- Yogmaya Neupane, Nepali poet considered pioneer of female Nepali poets

== Politicians ==
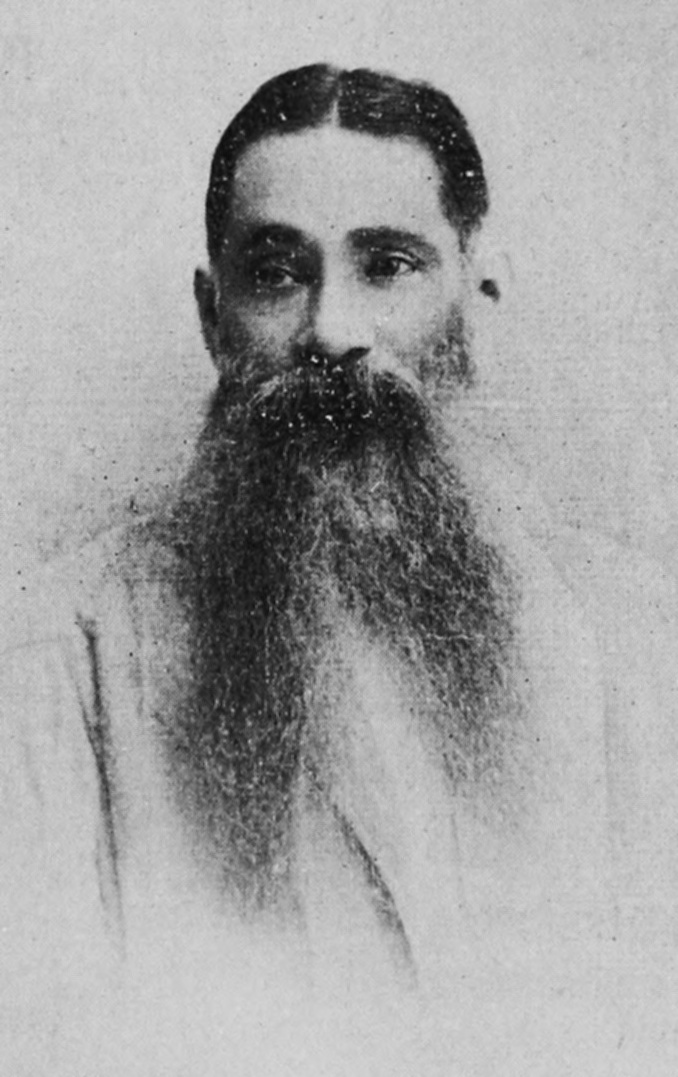
Womesh Chunder Bonnerjee

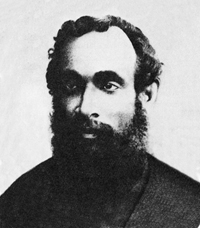
Surendranath Banerjee

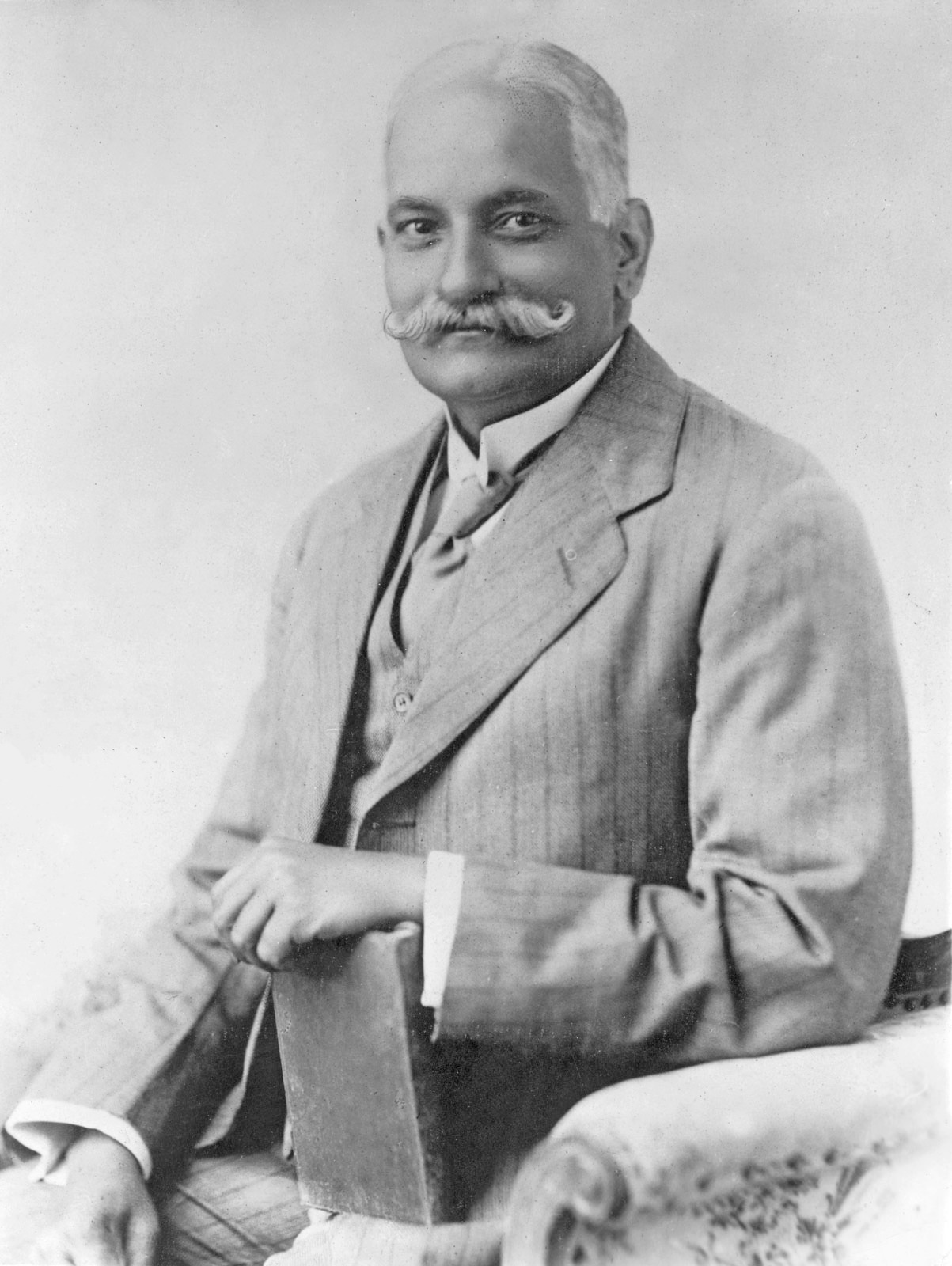
Motilal Nehru

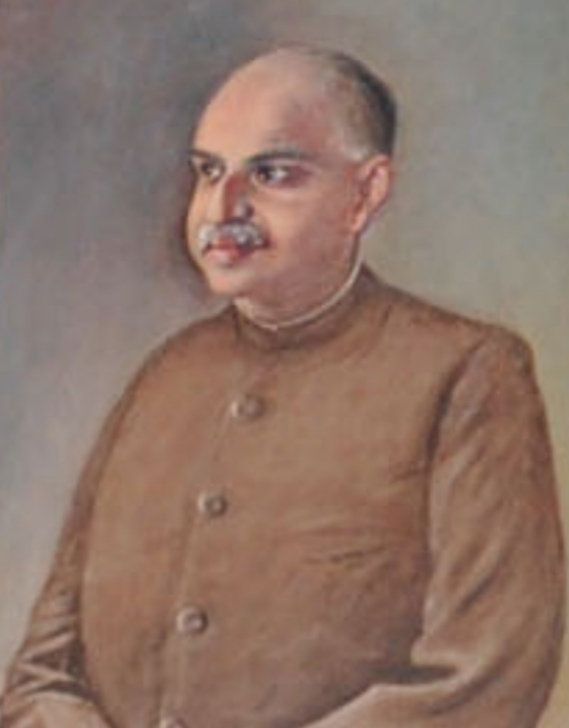
Shyama Prasad Mukherjee

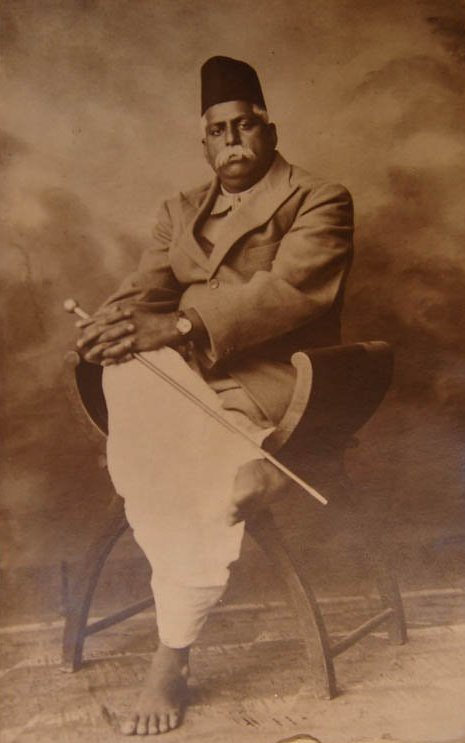
K.B. Hedgewar

=== Political party founders ===
- Kanu Sanyal, Indian politician who was the founding member of Communist Party of India (Marxist–Leninist)
- K. B. Hedgewar, founder of the Rashtriya Swayamsevak Sangh (RSS)
- Motilal Nehru Indian politician who was the 36th president of Indian congress.He co founded Swaraj Party
- Shripad Amrit Dange, co-founder of Communist Party of India. He was the Member of the Indian Parliament for Bombay Central and Central South
- Surendranath Banerjee, Indian politician who was the 11th president of Indian congress. He founded Indian National association and also co founded Indian National congress.He was the First Indian to qualify for Indian Civil Services Examination
- Syama Prasad Mukherjee, minister of industry and supply. He was the founder of Bharathiya Jana Sangh (predecessor of BJP)
- Womesh Chunder Bonnerjee, co-founder and First President of Indian National Congress.

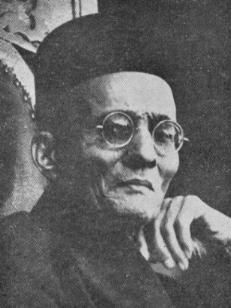
Vinayak Damodar Savarkar

=== Ministers, MPs and MLAs ===
- Arun Jaitley, Indian politician and attorney, Minister of Finance (2014–2019).
- Deendayal Upadhyaya, Indian politician who was the 10th President of Bharatiya Jana Sangh
- Girdhari Lal Bhargava, Indian politician who was the Member of Legislative Assembly and Member of Parliament of Rajasthan
- Gopal Jee Thakur, Indian Politician, Member of Parliament, lok Sabha from Darbhanga, Bihar. (Born. 1969)
- H. R. Bhardwaj, 27th Minister of Law and Justice, former Governor of Karnataka and Kerala
- Jana Krishnamurthi, Indian politician who was the former Union Law minister and 6th president of Bharathiya Janata Party
- Kanaiyalal Maneklal Munshi, Indian politician who was the 3rd Minister of Agriculture and 2nd Governor of Uttar Pradesh. He is the Founder of Bharathiya Vidya Bhavan
- K. S. Sudarshan was the Fifth Chief/Sarsanghachalak of the Rashtriya Swayamsevak Sangh
- Madhukar Dattatraya Deoras popularly known as Balasaheb Deoras, was the third Chief/Sarsanghchalak of Rashtriya Swayamsevak Sangh
- M. S. Golwalkar better known as Guruji was the second Chief/Sarsanghchalak of Rashtriya Swayamsevak Sangh
- P. Ramamurthi, Indian politician who was Member of Parliament and politburo member of Communist Party of India (Marxist)
- Prakash Pant, Indian Politician who was the MLA Speaker & Finance Minister of Uttarakhand Legislative assembly
- Pramod Mahajan, minister in the government of Vajpayee
- Prem Nath Dogra, Leader of Jammu & Kashmir known as Sher-e-Duggar.He was also the president of Bharatiya Jana Sangh (1955)
- Rahul Easwar, Indian right-wing activist, philosophy author and orator
- Rajendra Trivedi, speaker of Gujarat Legislative Assembly
- Sanjay Jha, former national spokesperson for the Indian National Congress
- Satish Sharma, Indian politician who was the Minister of Petroleum & Natural Gas (1993–1996) and MP of Uttar Pradesh (2010–2016)
- Shreedhar Mahadev Joshi, Indian politician who was the Member of Parliament, and leader of Samyukta Maharashtra Samiti
- Somnath Chatterjee, Indian politician who was the 14th Speaker of the Lok Sabha and Member of Parliament (1985–2009)
- Subhas Chakraborty, Indian politician who was the MLA, Minister of Transport, Minister of Sports & Youth Affairs and Minister of Tourism Government of West Bengal
- Subramanian Swamy, Indian politician, Member of Parliament, Rajya Sabha
- Uma Shankar Dikshit, Indian politician who was the 12th Governor of West Bengal, 7th Governor of Karnataka & 10th Minister of Home Affairs. He received Padma Vibhushan
- U. Srinivas Mallya, Indian politician who served as Member of Parliament for an 18-year tenure from 1946 to 1965
- Vasant Sathe, former Union Minister of Information and Broadcasting and he initiated process which led to Indian television moving into colour broadcasting for Asian Games 1982 and Hum Log the first colour Indian soap-opera.
- Vijay Mishra, represents the Gyanpur constituency in the Legislative Assembly of Uttar Pradesh
- Vinayak Damodar Savarkar, Indian politician who played developed the Hindtuva Ideology. He was leading figure in Hindu Mahasabha

=== Chief ministers ===
Photo	Name	State	
	Haribhau Upadhyaya	Ajmer State	
	P. V. Narasimha Rao	Andhra Pradesh	
	Tanguturi Prakasam	Andhra State	
	Gopinath Bordoloi	Assam	
	Shankar Dayal Sharma	Bhopal State	
	Binodanand Jha	Bihar	
	Kedar Pandey	Bihar	
	Jagannath Mishra	Bihar	
	Bindeshwari Dubey	Bihar	
	Bhagwat Jha	Bihar	
	B. G. Kher	Bombay State	
	Morarji Desai	Bombay State	
	Sushma Swaraj	Delhi	
	Sheila Dikshit	Delhi	
	Manohar Parrikar	Goa	
	Hitendra Desai	Gujarat	
	Ghanshyam Oza	Gujarat	
	Bhagwat Dayal Sharma	Haryana	
	Shanta Kumar	Himachal Pradesh	
	Burgula Ramakrishna Rao	Hyderabad State	
	R. Gundu Rao	Karnataka	
	Ramakrishna Hegde	Karnataka	
	E. M. S. Namboodiripad	Kerala	
	Liladhar Joshi	Madhya Bharat	
	Ravishankar Shukla	Madhya Pradesh	
	Bhagwantrao Mandloi	Madhya Pradesh	
	Kailash Nath Katju	Madhya Pradesh	
	Dwarka Prasad Mishra	Madhya Pradesh	
	Shyama Charan Shukla	Madhya Pradesh	
	Kailash Chandra Joshi	Madhya Pradesh	
	Motilal Vora	Madhya Pradesh	
	Manohar Joshi	Maharashtra	
	Devendra Fadnavis	Maharashtra	
	Sadashiva Tripathy	Odisha	
	Bishwanath Das	Odisha	
	Nandini Satpathy	Odisha	
	Binayak Acharya	Odisha	
	Brish Bhan	PEPSU	
	Gopi Chand Bhargava	Punjab	
	Hiralal Shastri	Rajasthan	
	C. S. Venkatachar	Rajasthan	
	Jai Narayan Vyas	Rajasthan	
	Tika Ram Paliwal	Rajasthan	
	Hari Dev Joshi	Rajasthan	
	C. Rajagopalachari	Tamil Nadu	
	V. N. Janaki	Tamil Nadu	
	J. Jayalalithaa	Tamil Nadu	
	Govind Ballabh Pant	Uttar Pradesh	
	Kamalapati Tripathi	Uttar Pradesh	
	Hemwati Nandan Bahuguna	Uttar Pradesh	
	Sripati Mishra	Uttar Pradesh	
	Nityanand Swami	Uttar Pradesh	Uttarakhand
	N. D. Tiwari		Uttarakhand
	Ajoy Mukherjee	West Bengal	
	Mamata Banerjee	West Bengal	
	Suvendu Adhikari	West Bengal	

=== Presidents of India ===
Photo	Name	Born	Death	Brahmin Sub-Cast	In Office
Sarvepalli Radhakrishnan	Sarvepalli Radhakrishnan	5 September 1888	17 April 1975	Niyogi Brahmin	Second President (13 May 1962 – 13 May 1967)
	V. V. Giri	10 August 1894	24 June 1980	Niyogi Brahmin	fourth president 24 August 1969 to 24 August 1974
	Ramaswamy Venkataraman	4 December 1910	27 January 2009	Iyer Brahmin	Eighth president 25 July 1987 to 25 July 1992
Shankar Dayal Sharma	Shankar Dayal Sharma	19 August 1918	26 December 1999	Gaur Brahmin	Ninth President (25 June 1992 – 25 July 1997)
Pranab Mukherjee	Pranab Mukherjee	11 December 1935	31 August 2020	Kulin Brahmin	Thirteenth President (25 July 2012 – 25 July 2017)

=== Prime Ministers of India ===
Photo	Name	Born	Death	Brahmin Sub-Cast	In Office
	Jawaharlal Nehru	14 November 1889	27 May 1964	Saraswat Brahmin (Kashmiri Pandit)	First PM (15 August 1947 – 27 May 1964)
	Indira Gandhi	19 November 1917	31 October 1984	Saraswat Brahmin (Kashmiri Pandit)	Third PM (24 January 1964 – 24 March 1977 and 14 January 1980 – 31 October 1984)
Morarji Desai	Morarji Desai	29 February 1896	10 April 1995	Anavil Brahmin	Fourth PM (24 March 1977 – 28 July 1979)
P.V.Narasimha Rao	P. V. Narasimha Rao	28 June 1921	23 December 2004	Niyogi Brahmin	Ninth Prime Minister (21 June 1991 – 16 May 1996 )
Atal Bihari Vajpayee	Atal Bihari Vajpayee	25 December 1924	16 August 2018	Kanyakubja Brahmin	Tenth Prime Minister (16 May 1996 – 1 June 1996 and 19 March 1998 – 22 May 2004)

== Professionals ==
- Anant Pai (Uncle Pai), pioneer of Indian Comics whose famous work includes Amar Chitra Katha and Tinkle
- Daya Nayak, Indian police inspector and detective who is fame for being Encounter specialist. He has gunned down more than 80 criminals in Mumbai Underworld.
- Dhan Gopal Mukerji, Indian Man of Letters who was the first Indian in United States to win Newbery Medal in 1928
- Ganapati Chakraborty, Indian magician who is considered to be the pioneer of Bengal modern magic. He was the mentor of P. C. Sorcar & K Lal
- Kanaka Murthy, Indian sculptor who received Jakanachari Award
- R. K. Laxman, Indian cartoonist
- Samay Raina, Indian YouTuber and Stand – Up Comedian
- Shashi Kant, IPS officer and former DGP of Punjab. He played a major role against Illegal drug trade

== Rishi (Sages) ==
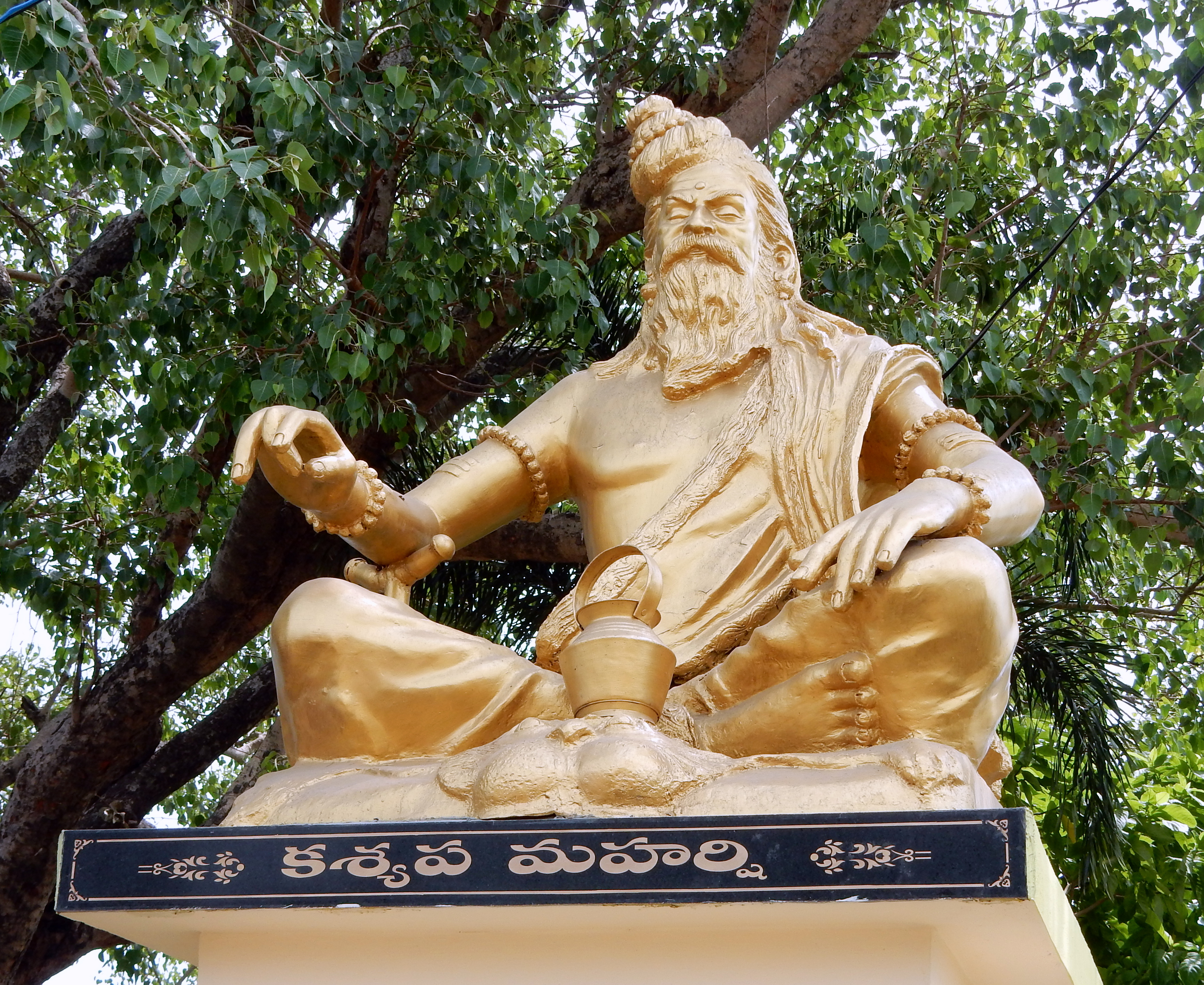
Statue of Kashyapa

- Bharadvaja, one of the Saptrishi
- Bharata Muni, Vedic sage who wrote Natya Shastra and regarded as the father of Indian theatrical art forms
- Bhrigu, The first compiler of predictive astrology, and also the author of the Bhrigu Samhita, the astrological classic.
- Chandrashekarendra Saraswati known as the "Sage of Kanchi" or Mahaperiyava (meaning "The great elder')
- Jaimini, Vedic sage and founder of the Mimamsa philosophy
- Kashyapa, Rigvedic sage
- Marichi, Father of Kashyapa and the founder of Vedanta
- Valmiki, attributed author of the Ramayana
- Vashishta, the first rishi of Vedanta
- Vishvamitra, a Rigvedic sage who was the chief author of Mandala 3 of the Rigveda
- Vyasa, attributed author of the Mahabharata and the Puranas

== Rulers and warriors ==
=== Rulers ===
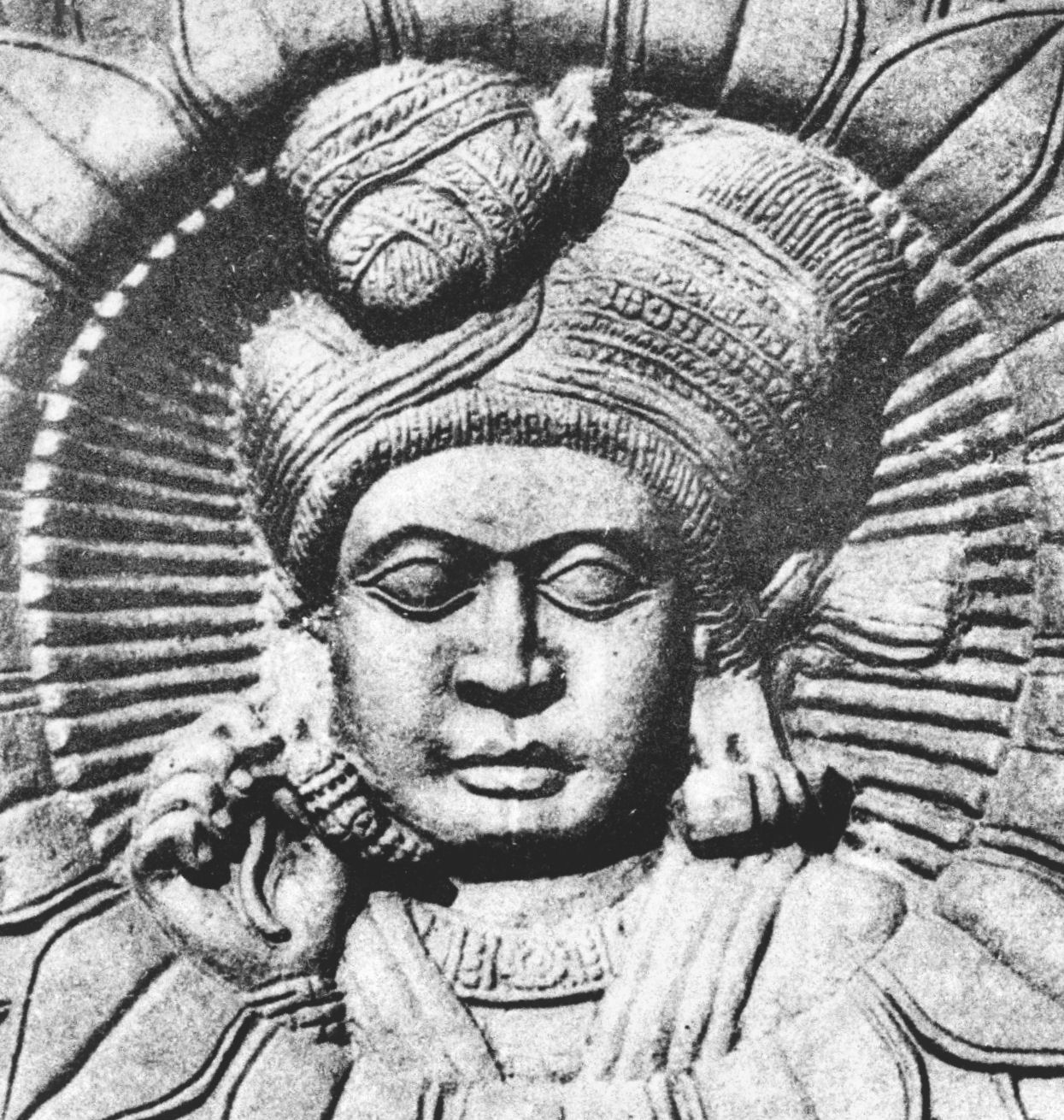
Pushyamitra Shunga, Emperor of North India

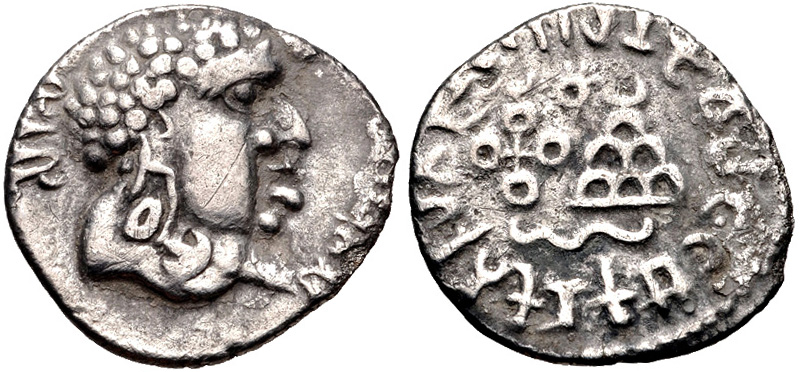
Coin of Gautamiputra Satakarni, The lord of Dakshinapatha

- Pushyamitra Shunga – founder and first ruler of the Shunga Empire.
- Gautamiputra Satakarni, A Satavahana Emperor.
- Kaundinya I founder of Funan
- Chach of Alor – Hindu king of Sindh and was the founder of Brahman dynasty.
- Raja Dahir – last Brahmin king of Sindh who sacrificed his life fighting for Hindustan against Arab invasion
- Hemu – Indian king who fought Afghan rebels and Mughal forces of Humayun and Akbar
- Kulasekara Cinkaiariyan – the first of the Aryacakravarti dynasty kings.
- Bhavashankari – Rani/Queen of Bhurishrestha
- Cankili II – the self-proclaimed last king of the Jaffna kingdom
- Devabhuti – last ruler of Shunga empire
- Maharaja Gangadhar Rao, 5th Maharaja of Jhansi and Newalkar dynasty
- Gangu – Brahmin ruler of the Deccan.
- Lakshmibai – Rani/Queen of Jhansi
- Mayurasharma – founder of the Kadamba dynasty.
- Rani Bhabani – Rani/Queen of Natore
- Raja Ganesha – founder of Ganesha dynasty. He ended the first Ilyas Shahi Dynasty and started Hindu Empire in Bengal
- Rudranarayan – Maharaja of Bhurishrestha
- Singai Pararasasegaram most powerful and well known king of Aryacakravarti dynasty.
- Vasudeva Kanva – founder of the Brahmin Kanva dynasty
- Vindhyashakti – founder of the Vakataka dynasty

=== Warriors ===
- Dadoji Konddeo – administrator of Shahaji's fiefdom and mentor to Shivaji.
- Gopana – was the General of Kumara Kampana II who was the son of Bukka Raya the founder of Vijayanagara Empire
- Mahan Singh Mirpuri – famous general in the Khalsa Army, and was the second-in-command general to General Sardar Hari Singh Nalwa.
- Khushal Singh Jamadar – was a Military officer and Chamberlain of Sikh Empire
- Misr Diwan Chand – A famous general in Khalsa Army of Maharaja Ranjit Singh.
- Moropant Trimbak Pingle – Pingle was the Peshwe in Shivaji Maharaj reign excellent warrior and architect accompanied him in many campaigns.
- Baji Rao I – Peshwa of Maratha Empire.

== Science, technology, engineering ==
- Anandi Gopal Joshi, one of the first Indian female doctors who practised with a degree in Western medicine
- Dwarkanath Kotnis (1910–1949), Indian physician and one of the five Indian physicians dispatched to China to provide medical assistance during the Second Sino-Japanese War in 1938.
- Iravatham Mahadevan, Indian epigraphist known for his decipherment of Tamil-Brahmi inscriptions and for his expertise of Indus Valley civilisation
- Irawati Karve, first woman Anthropologist of India
- Janaki Ammal, Indian botanist whose notable work involved studies on sugarcane and the eggplant. She received Padma Shri
- Kadambini Ganguly, one of the first Indian female doctors who practised with a degree in Western medicine
- K. S. Krishnan, Indian physicist who was the co-discoverer of Raman scattering and mentor of C. V. Raman. He also received Padma Bhushan
- Shyamala Gopalan, Indian American biomedical scientist and mother of vice-president of United States Kamala Harris
- Udupi Ramachandra Rao, former ISRO chairman and one of the pioneer of Indian satellite development programme (developed India's first satellite Aryabhata)

== Social sciences ==
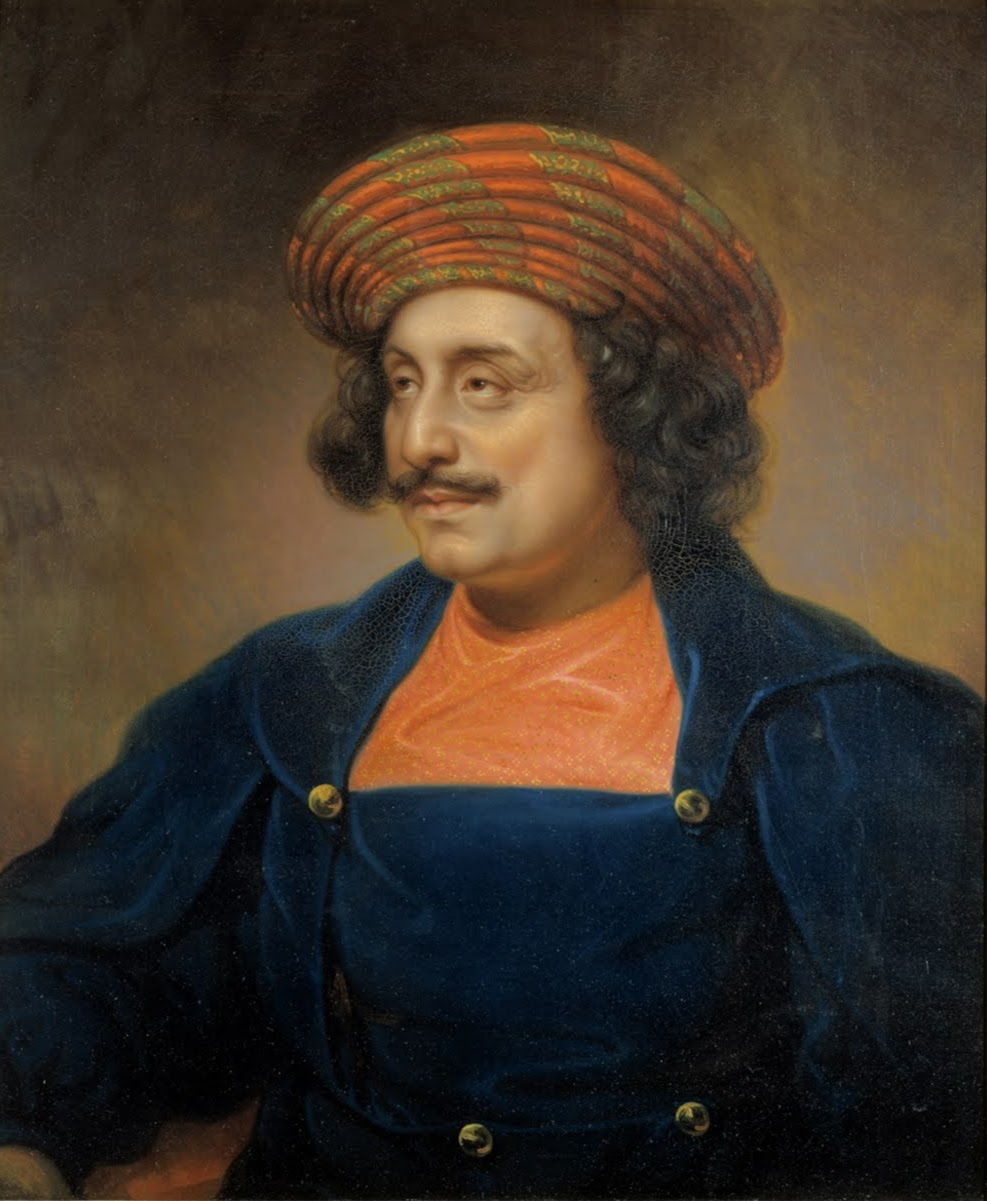
Raja Ram Mohan Roy

- Agnivesh, Indian social activist and the founder of Arya Sabha
- Arya Pallam, Social reformer, communist, feminist from Kerala who fought against the oppression of upper class (Brahman) women
- Dhondo Keshav Karve, social reformer who built India's first school for widows and first university for women. He also received Bharat Ratna.
- Girish Prabhune, Indian social worker whose works included towards upliftment of the nomadic Pardhi community. He received Padma Shri
- G. S. Ghurye, Sociology Professor & considered Founder of Indian Sociology
- Ishwar Chandra Vidyasagar, Indian educator and social reformer considered the "father of Bengali prose".
- Jaya Arunachalam, Indian social worker and the founder of Working Women's Forum. She received Padma Shri.
- Jiddu Krishnamurti, Indian philosopher, speaker and writer
- Jnanadanandini Devi, social reformer who influenced the earliest phase of women's empowerment in 19th century Bengal
- Laxmi Narayan Tripathi, Indian LGBT activist who was the first transgender person to represent Asia Pacific in the UN in 2008 and also the Acharya Mahamandaleshwar of
- Nanaji Deshmukh, social reformer and politician. He received Padma Vibhushan and Bharat Ratna
- Shiv Narayan Agnihotri, founder of Dev Samaj
- Priyamvada Gopal, professor at University of Cambridge
- Ram Mohan Roy, co-founder of the Brahmo Sabha and the precursor of the Brahmo Samaj,
- R. S. Subbalakshmi (Sister Subbalakshmi) Indian Social Reformer who received Padma Shri
- T. M. A. Pai, founder of India's first private medical school Kasturba Medical College who established Manipal Institute of Technology. He received Padma Shri
- Traffic Ramaswamy
- U. G. Krishnamurti, Indian speaker and spiritual writer

== Spiritual gurus ==
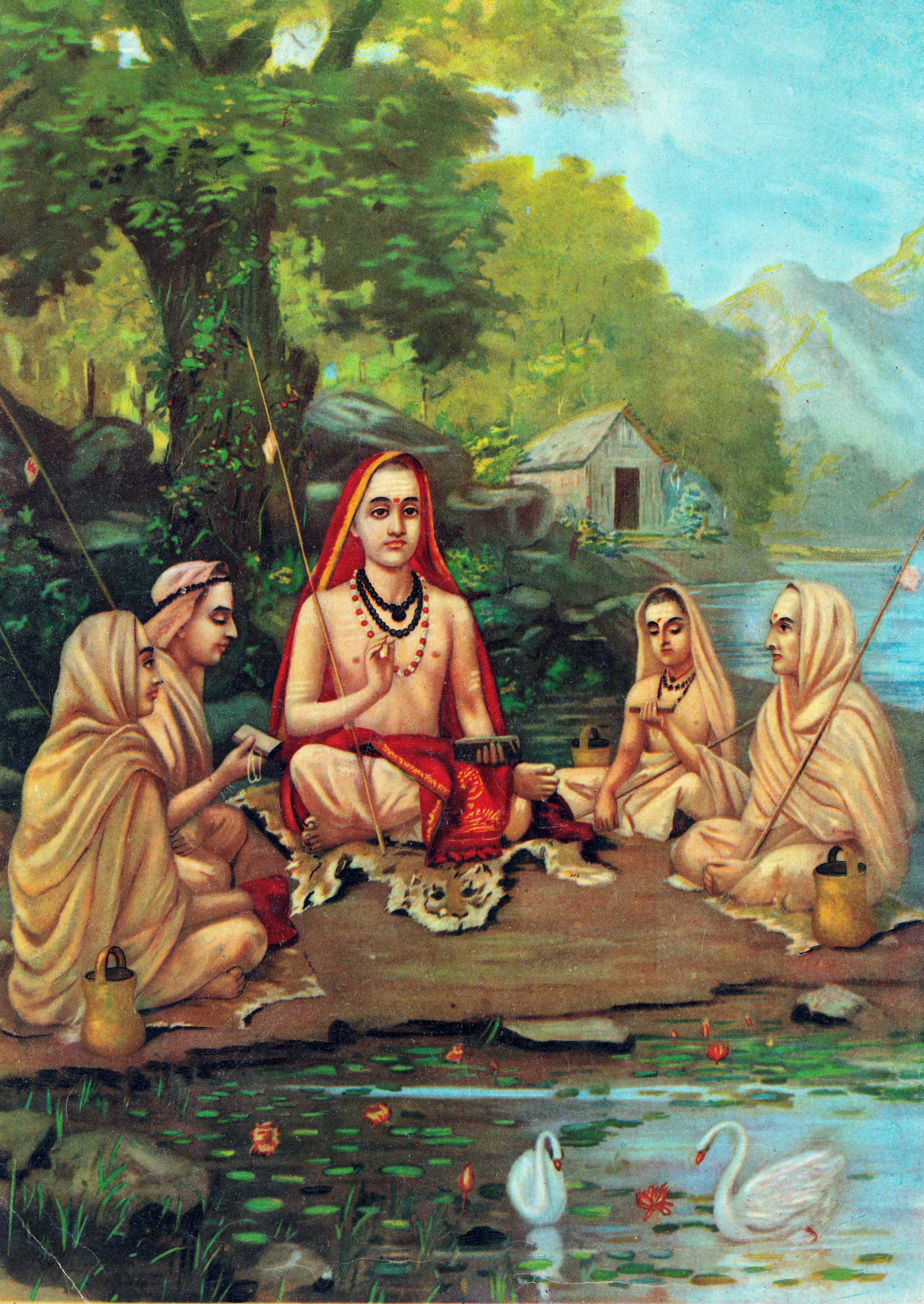
Adi Shankaracharya

- Adi Shankara
- Abhinavagupta, Kashmiri shaiv philosopher
- Bhava Brihaspati, 12th Century Pashupata ascetic
- Anukulchandra Chakravarty, Indian Guru who was the founder Satsang (Deoghar)
- Brahmananda Saraswati
- Chaitanya Mahaprabhu considered to be Avatar of Radhe Krishna.He founded Gaudiya Vaishnavism & composed Shikshashtakam
- Dayanand Saraswati, founder of Arya Samaj
- Eknath, according to legend
- Dyaneshwar
- Gopalanand Swami
- Krishnananda Saraswati
- Mandan Mishra, Mimansic philosopher who debated with adi shankara
- Madhvacharya
- Nagarjuna, one of the most important buddhist philosopher
- Neem Karoli Baba
- Nimbarkacharya, Vaishnav vedantic philosopher
- Raghavan N. Iyer
- Ramakrishna
- Ramananda, founder of Ramanandi/Vairagi Samprada and prominent saint of Bhakti movement.
- Ramanujacharya
- Sarada Devi
- Sitaramdas Omkarnath said to be Divine Incarnate/Avatar of Kali Yuga
- Sri Chinmoy, Indian guru who established first meditation center in Queens, New York.He started the Peace Run movement
- Swami Haridas, Vaishnav saint who established Bankey Bihari temple.
- Swami Ramanand
- Upasni Maharaj
- Vallabha Acharya, founder of Pushtimarg Samprada

== Sports ==
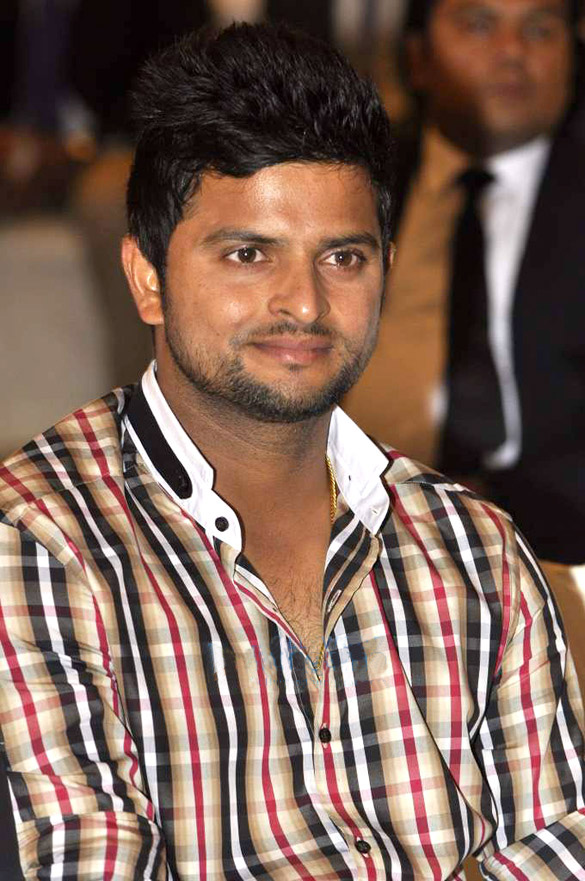
Suresh Raina

- D. B. Deodhar, former Indian cricketer
- Dilip Sardesai, Indian cricketer; father of journalist Rajdeep Sardesai
- Kirti Azad, Indian cricketer turned politician who was a Member of Parliament Lok Sabha
- Mihir Sen, first Indian to swim the English Channel
- Mukundrao Pai, Indian cricketer and captain during 1911 tour of England
- Prakash Padukone, Indian badminton player who was the World no.1 player in 1980
- Subramanian Badrinath
- Suresh Raina, Indian cricketer

== Writers ==
- Abburi Chayadevi, Telugu fictional writer
- Gurajada Apparao, Indian playwright who was given title Kavisekhara and Abyudaya Kavitha Pithamahudu
- Hazari Prasad Dwivedi – Hindi author, novelist, literary historian, essayist, critic and scholar. He received Padma Bhushan
- Kalhana, Indian author of Rajatarangini (River of Kings), an account of the History of Kashmir.
- Kandukuri Veeresalingam, Indian writer who is considered Father of Telugu Renaissance movement
- Kalki Krishnamurthy, Indian writer whose notable works include Ponniyin Selvan and Sivagamiyin Sabadham
- Lalithambika Antharjanam, Indian author and social reformer best known for her literary works in Malayalam language
- Mahasweta Devi, Indian writer who received Jnanpith Award, Ramon Magsaysay Award, Padma Shri and Padma Vibhushan
- Mamoni Raisom Goswami, Indian writer who received Padma Shri, Jnanpith Award and Prince Claus Fund
- Manilal Nabhubhai Dwivedi, Gujarati-language writer, philosopher, and social thinker from British India
- Masti Venkatesha Iyengar
- Padma Lakshmi, Indian American author and Television Host.
- Parithimar Kalaignar, Tamil professor who was the first to campaign Tamil as Classical language and first to use the term Kumari Kandam
- P. N. Oak, Indian writer
- Pralhad Keshav Atre, Indian writer popularly known as Acharya Atre
- Rahul Sankrityayan, Indian author who spent 45 years of his life on travels away from home & considered "Father of Indian travelogue" He received Padma Bhushan
- Rajam Krishnan
- R. K. Narayan, Indian writer who received Benson Medal, Padma Bhushan and Padma Vibhushan
- Seepersad Naipaul, Indo-Trinidadian writer
- Shardha Ram Phillauri – Indian writer of the Hindu religious hymn "Om Jai Jagdish Hare" and Bhagyawati, one of the first Hindi novels.
- Shivaram Karanth, Indian polymath and novelist
- Somadeva, Indian writer who was the author of a famous compendium of Indian legends, fairy tales and folk tales – the Kathasaritsagara
- Vishnubhat Godse, Indian travelogue writer known for Maza Pravas

== Yogi ==
- B.K.S. Iyengar, Indian Yoga guru who founded "Iyengar Yoga style".He received Padma Shri, Padma Bhushan & Padma Vibhushan
- Chidananda Saraswati, Indian yogi who was president of the Divine Life Society
- Dhirendra Brahmachari
- K. Pattabhi Jois
- Lahiri Mahasaya
- Sivananda Saraswati
- Swaminarayan
- Swami Rama
- Tirumalai Krishnamacharya, Indian yoga guru who is considered as "Father of Modern Yoga"

== See also ==
- List of Brahmin dynasties and states
- List of Bengali Brahmins
- List of Chitpawan Brahmins
- List of Saraswat Brahmins
- List of Deshastha Brahmins
- List of Gaud Saraswat Brahmins
- List of Gaur Brahmins
- List of Iyengars
- List of Iyers
- List of Kanyakubja Brahmins
- List of Karhade Brahmins
- List of Kashmiri Brahmins
- List of Madhva Brahmins
- List of Maithil Brahmins
- List of Saraswat Brahmins
- List of Tamil Brahmins
- List of Telugu Brahmins

== Bibliography ==
- Bhai Parmanand (2009). The Story Of My Life. Prabhat Prakashan. ISBN 978-81-87100-38-6.
- Duff, James Grant (1921), Stephen Meredyth Edwardes (ed.), A History of the Mahrattas, vol. 2, London: H. Milford, Oxford University Press, OCLC 61585379
