= Shashikant =

Shashikant or Shashi Kant or Shashi Kanta are given names. People with the names include:

- Shashikant Shinde
- Shashikant Garware
- Shashikant Sutar
- Shashikant Khurana
- Shashikant Dhotre
- Shashikant Khandkar
- Shashikant Narsingrao Khedekar
- Shashi Kant Seth
- Shashi Kant
- Shashi Kant Sharma
- Shashi Kanta Verma
