= Parvathi Nenmenimangalam =

Indian social reformer (1911–1947)

Parvathi Nenmenimangalam (1911–1947) was an Indian social reformer from Kerala.

Nenmenimangalam was born in 1911 to Vishnu Namboothiri and Saraswathi Antharjanam at Irigalakkuda, Nadavarabathu Nalloor illam.

Nenmenimangalam played an important role in organizing a social reform movement among the Namboodiri women. She along with Arya Pallam lead a movement to boycott cadjan umbrellas (Marakkuda) which was considered as a symbol of chastity among Namboodiri women and conducted a procession without cadjan umbrella. She was the president of the women's conference at Yogakhema sabha.

Nenmenimangalam was responsible for the first widow remarriage in Namboothiri caste. She died in 1947.
