= Arya Pallam =

Indian social reformer, communist and feminist

Arya Pallam was a social reformer, communist, feminist from Kerala who fought against the oppression of Brahmin women.

== Reform activities ==
Arya, along with Kanjoor Gauri Antherjanam, Kanjoor Kali Antherjanam participated in Yachanayatra (Begging march) led by V.T.Bhattathirippad which motivated Brahmin women to boycott their veil (Ghosha). In a meeting of Yogakshema Sabha, an organisation founded by V. T. Battathirippad for upliftment of Savarna and Brahman women, at V.T. Battathiripad's house a resolution was passed under the leadership of Arya Pallam and Parvathi Nenmenimangalam to boycott cadjan umbrellas (Marakkuda) which was considered as a symbol of chastity among Brahman women and conducted a procession without cadjan umbrella. It was repeated in the Taliparamba session where, Parvathi Nenmanimangalam, Aryapallam and Devaki Narikkattari boycotted Ghosha (veil) and declared that chastity was not in "marakkuda" and they broke it. They also started wearing sari like other Indian women.

At Pazhoor session of Yogakshema Sabha, presided by K N Kuttan Namboodiri, Arya introduced a resolution called 'Anthapura Mardananeesanam'; which literarily translates to Stopping of oppressions inside the house. She along with P. Priyadatta, E.S. Saraswati, I.C. Priyadatta, Rema Thampuratti and Indhira Thampuratti played an important role in Paliyam Satyagraha (1947–48).

Arya Pallam was an elected member of the Malabar district board. She was also a leader of Kathumuri Movement.

She was instrumental in making the arrangements for the first widow remarriage that took place among the Kerala Brahman and savarna women community. M.R. Bhattathiripad and wife stayed with the Pallam family for quite some time after their marriage took place.

== Personal life ==
Arya Pallam was married to Krishnan Namboothiri. He was a full-time Communist party worker. She had four children, three girls and a boy. The boy died in childhood.
