= Gangu (ruler) =

Brahmin ruler of the Deccan

Gangu or Gangadhar Shastri Wabale was a Brahmin ruler of the Deccan. A popular legend claims that Ala-ud-din Hasan Bahman Shah, the founder of the Bahmani Sultanate, was a servant and general in his service, but historians generally reject this as unfounded.

== Biography ==
Gangu was a Brahmin ruler of the Deccan. There is a popular legend regarding him narrated by the 17th century poet Ferishta, which says that Hasan Gangu (Ala-ud-Din Bahman Shah) was a servant of a brahmin ruler named Gangu (hence the name Hasan Gangu), who educated Hasan in Hinduism and made him a general in his army. Historians have not found any corroboration for the legend.
