= Rekha Raju =

Indian classical dancer

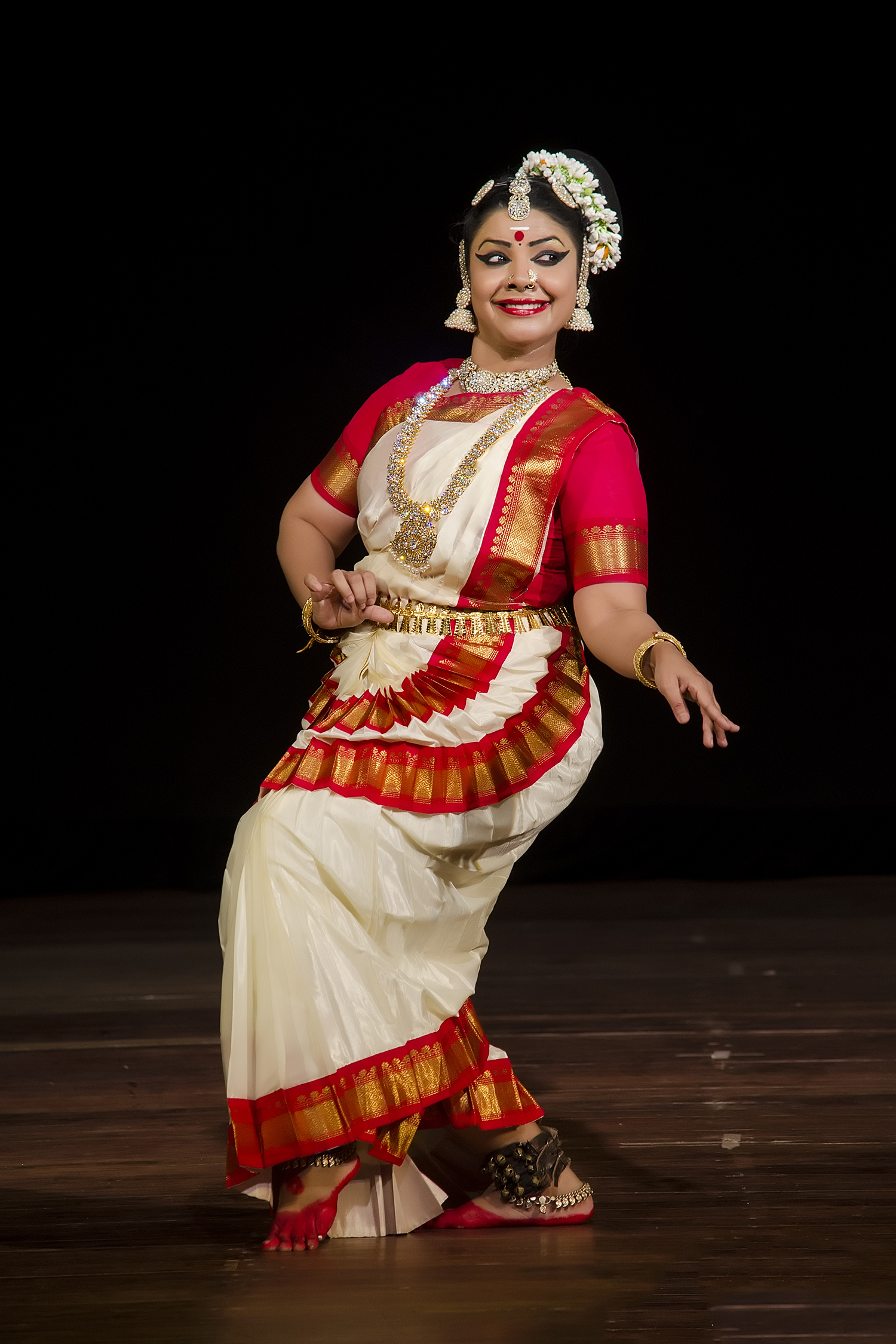
- Raju performing Mohiniyattam
- Born: 10 April 1989 (age 37); Kalpathi, Palakkad, Kerala
- Education: PhD in Fine Arts
- Alma mater: Bangalore University
- Occupations: Dancer, Choreographer
- Years active: 2003–present
- Known for: Mohiniyattam and Bharatanatyam
- Website: rekharaju.com

Rekha Raju is an Indian classical dance performer and teacher from Bangalore, Karnataka. She specialises in the Bharatnatyam and Mohiniyattam dance forms.

== Early life and education ==
Rekha was born to M.R.Raju and Jayalakshmi Raghavan and brought up in Bangalore. She started learning classical dance at the age of four. She trained intensively under various gurus, including Kalamandalam Usha Datar, Raju Datar, Gopika Varma and Janardhanan. She started her college education pursuing a degree in commerce, while she studied Administration in Human Resource & Accounts and Performing of Art for her master's degree. She completed her Ph.D. in Fine Arts from Heidelberg University, Germany. She is a distinction holder of master's degree in Bharathnatyam and rank holder of the Vidwath proficiency.

== Career ==
She made her stage debut (Arangetram) in 2003 at Ravindra Kalakshetra in Bangalore. She has been performing on various stages in India and abroad from the age of four and performed as a soloist for many respected institutions of dance in India, including Yuva Sourabha, organized by the Kannada Culture Department, programme at the Indian Council for Cultural Relations, Institute of World Culture, Delhi International Festival, Poona Dance Festival, Kajuraho Dance Festival, Konark Dance Festival, Purana Quila, Chennai Seasonal Dance Festival, Chidambaram Dance Festival, Vishwa Kannada Sammelan at Belgaum, Andhra Music & Dance Festival etc. She has received much critical acclaim for both her solo and group choreography. Presently Raju is working as an assistant dance teacher at Bangalore Tamil Sangam and as a guest lecturer in dance at the International Center for Management & Indian Studies where the foreign students trained to improvise Indian culture. She is an auditioned artiste at the Bangalore Doordarshan and an empanelled artiste for the Indian Council for Cultural Relations. She also heads a dance institution named Nrithya Dhama, where she trains kids from minority backgrounds, and is also associated with the Freedom Foundation, a volunteer group that rehabilitates children with HIV. Raju has participated at the Tanjore Dance Festival where 1000 dancers performed, securing entrance in the Limca Book of Records. She has been honoured by the Bangolre Tamil sangam as the Best Young Dancer to promote Indian Art. She has also been given the title Swarna Mukhi by the Kalahalli Temple Trust.

== Awards and credentials ==
Nandikeshwar Award -2025 ITDC Award - 2024

- Ustad Bismillah Khan 2020 - Central Sangeet Natak Academy( overall contribution to performing arts )
- Kalayogi from Bangalore ICCR - 2018
- Krishna Gana Sabha Endowment Award by Krishna Gana Sabha - 2016
- Yuva Kala Prathibha by Bangalore Club for Kathakali and The Arts - 2014
- Abhinava Bharathi - 2013
- Yuva Kala Bharathi by Bharat Kalachar - 2013
- Natya Veda Award by Natraj Dance Academy - 2013
- Nrithya Kaumudhi title by Government of Andhra Pradesh - 2012
- Nrithya Vibhushan by Bogadi Murthy - 2012
- Nrithya Rejini title by Kannur Arts Academy - 2011
- Swara Mukhi title by Kalhalli Temple Trust - 2010
- Best Young Dancer by Bangalore Tamil Sangam - 2009
