= Jaya Arunachalam =

Indian social worker and activist (1935–2019)

- Jaya Arunachalam in 2018

Founder, Working Women's Forum
- Succeeded by: Nandini Azad

Personal details
- Born: 8 February 1935 Tamil Nadu, India
- Died: 29 June 2019 (aged 84) Chennai, Tamil Nadu, India
- Occupation: Social worker
- Awards: Padma Shri, Stree Shakti Puraskar

Jaya Arunachalam was an Indian social worker and the founder of Working Women's Forum, a non-governmental organization based in the Indian state of Tamil Nadu, working for the welfare of marginalized women. Starting in 1978, she channeled her activities under the aegis of the forum for organizing poor working women and provided them with seed capital to start their small business or to develop their existing business.

Arunachalam was born on 8 February 1935 in Tamil Nadu in a Brahmin family and has a master's degree in economics and geography. She was a member of the governing council of the Society for International Development, Rome, and was recognized as the first South Asian woman to join the council.

Arunachalam also served as the vice president of the Tamil Nadu Congress Committee and a member of the All India Congress Committee, along with several committees related to women's welfare and development across India.

== Working Women's Forum (WWF) ==
In 1978, Arunachalam founded the Working Women's Forum, an organization that aims to organize and unite women working in the informal sector, especially small-scale traders and sellers. By doing so, the WWF is able to identify and address the problems faced by women in unorganized professions, with a view to make policy decisions and empower these women through the provision of facilities such as training, credit, material inputs, etc. In line with any other worker union, the WWF allows women to collectively demand better working conditions, social and political rights.

Hillary Clinton visiting the Working Women's Forum in July 2011.

The WWF is an apolitical organization, and is secular, anti-case and anti-dowry. It exclusively focuses on women's economic mobilization. According to Arunachalam, the forum was created "to develop the total human resource potential of very poor women workers in the informal sector."

== Indian Cooperative Network For Women (ICNW) ==
In 1981, Arunachalam initiated India's first cooperative organization for poor women, the Indian Cooperative Network for Women. This was established as an attempt to create an informal banking structure for women working in an informal setting. It works in sync with the Working Women's Forum, to provide loans and financial assistance to poor women.

The ICNW in its underlying principles holds that intersectionality is extremely important to understand while understanding poverty and oppression among women. According to its website, "Five interwoven threads of oppression can be discerned as class exploitation, caste inferiority, male dominance, isolation in a closed world and physical weakness".

Not only does the ICNW provide loans and extensions, it also assists the beneficiaries with insurance, legal awareness and digitalized coverage of the credit and income operations. Along with the efforts of the WWF, the ICNW has provided financial aid to over 700,000 women in over 3,000 villages and 1,600 slums.

== Awards ==
She is a recipient of many awards such as Global Leadership Award for Economic Development from Vital Voices, International Activist Award (2003) from the Gliestman Foundation, California, and the Rashtriya Ekta Award from the National Awareness Forum, India. The Government of India awarded her the fourth highest civilian award of Padma Shri in 1987 by the Union Government of India and the Stree Shakti Puraskar by the State Government of Tamil Nadu in 2002. She received the Jamnalal Bajaj Award in 2009. In 2010, she was chosen for the Social Lifetime Achievement Award in the Godfrey Philips National Bravery Awards.

== Personal life ==
Arunachalam was born on 8 February 1935 in Tamil Nadu, India, to a Brahmin family. After obtaining her master's degree, in 1955 she married a Chettiar man who, despite being educated, was not approved of by her parents. She was shunned by her family, including her parents and six sisters, who after the death of her mother reconciled with her.

Her daughter, Nandini Azad, is now the president of the ICNW and has taken over all operations of the WWF from her.

Arunachalam died on June 29, 2019, after an illness that lasted for two weeks. She spent her last days in Chennai, Tamil Nadu.

== See also ==
- Working Women's Forum
- Society for International Development
- Vital Voices
