= Girish Prabhune =

Indian social worker

Girish Y. Prabhune (born 1952 in Pune, Maharashtra) is an Indian social worker and social activist known particularly for his work towards upliftment of the nomadic Pardhi community and their children since 1970. He was conferred the Padma Shri in 2021 in Social Work category.

== Work ==
Prabhune began his career as a social worker in early 1970s. He initially started working with Srikant G. Majgaokar in the Gramayan NGO during the 1972 Maharashtra drought. He also ran a periodical called Asidhara, but this endeavor left him in debt.

Prabhune lived in Nimgaon Mhalungi village in Pune district for nearly 10 years working with the locals. His stay at this village allowed him to observe and interact with the nomadic communities including the Pardhi, Waddar, Kaikadi, Davari Gosavi, Gondhali, dombari, Kolhati, Lambadi, and Pothuraju.

Prabhune started discussions with Laxman Mane to start the Bhatke Wimukt Vikas Parishad organisation for uplifting the nomadic communities. Via this organization, he organized the nomadic tribes in Beed, Osmanabad, Solapur, Parbhani, Nanded, and Pune districts, advancing their political power. He also fought court battles arguing for nomadic rights. Prabhune, a Rashtriya Swayamsevak Sangh volunteer since young age, effectively persuaded 50,000 fed-up Dalits who had intended to leave Hinduism for Buddhism at Deekshabhoomi in Nagpur.

In 1993, he started a school in rural Yamgarwadi village in Tuljapur Tahsil, Osmanabad district for the children of the nomadic tribes, which still continues to this date.

In later part of his life he started the Punarutthan Samarasata Gurukulam, a NGO run by Krantiveer Chapekar Smarak Samiti, in Chinchwad, Pune. This NGO and runs schools and residential facility for the Pardhi children.

== Awards ==
- 2021 - Padma Shri in Social work category
- 2015 - Samajik Seva Jivan Gaurav Puraskar
- 2000 - Antyodaya Puraskar by Rambhau Mhalgi Prabodhini

== Personal life ==
Prabhune was born in 1952 in a Brahmin family. He lives in Chinchwad with his wife Arundhati and their 3 children.
