= Working Women's Forum =

Women's organisation in India

The Working Women's Forum (WWF) is a women's organisation in southern India. It was founded in 1978 by Jaya Arunachalam in Madras (Chennai). The WWF aims to empower poor women in southern India by providing microcredit, a trade union, health care and training. It works with the poor women working in the informal sector, such as street vendors, silkworm growers and silk weavers, handicraft producers, washerwomen and fisherwomen.

7,00,000 plus women have been brought together through WWF through the issue of credit and other services were also added such as that of child care, family planning, and education.

One of the main reasons for women to join the WWF is to receive access to credit, since the amount of credit they receive is higher than that of informal lending, along with a reasonable interest rate.

There are two organisations closely related to the WWF:

- Indian Co-operative Network for Women (ICNW), provides loans
- National Union of Working Women (NUWW), a trade union

The WWF follows strong ideological positions as follows;

Pro Women: Exclusively catering to women of the informal sector who provide support to their families and welfare.

Anti-Dowry: To eradicate the practice of dowry through mass demonstration against such practices involving rape and divorce.

Anti-Caste and Pro-Secularism: Supporting women regardless of their castes and religious beliefs and inter-caste weddings.

Anti-Politics: Avoiding involving the areas related to political parties and agendas.

== History ==
WWF initially started with 30 women who were involved in petty trading, during the mid-70s, and formed themselves into a group with the assistance of Jaya Arunchalam, who was then a social/political worker in Madras. The group of women approached a bank for a loan, and received a sum of ₹300 for each member. Each day since then the repayment amount was collected from the women, and the repayment reached sum reached 95%.

By April 1978, about 800 women were involved into this activity, formed into 40 groups and began receiving loans. This led to the emergence of Working Women's Forum.

Since then the WWF has received massive recognition, as former US state secretary Hillary Clinton conducted a visit to the WWF during her visit to India in July 2011.

Through the years WWF has helped women with their everyday lives, prevented them from committing suicide due to financial burdens, social pressures, objectification and discrimination against women and also health problems.

== Objectives ==
WWF has few socioeconomic and political objectives such as:

- To form organized groups of women who are employed in the informal or unorganized sector
- To build and improve the entrepreneurial skills of women through credit, training and extension services
- To identify the women involved in working in the informal sector and provide aid
- To mobilize credit and working women for joint action demanding their political and social rights

== Publications ==
'Reaching out to poor women through Grassroots initiatives: An Indian Experiment' - 1992.

'Dynamic Agents of population control and change process: An Indian Experiment' - 1992

'Indian Co-operative Network for Women - An Innovative Approach to Micro - Credit' - 1995

'National Union of Working Women - Breaking the Legacy of Invisibility' - 1995

'Social platform through social innovations - A coalition with women in the informal sector - WWF(I)' - 2000.

"Structuring a movement and spreading it on" History and growth of the Working Women's Forum (India) 1978-2003 Jaya Arunachalam / Brunhild Landwehr (eds.) IKO-Verlag für Interkulturelle Kommunikation Frankfurt am Main. London, 2003 ISBN 3-88939-658-5

Women's Equality - A Struggle for Survival by Jaya Arunachalam Articles, Paper, Speeches of Jaya Arunachalam presented at various conferences GYAN BOOKS P. LTD 5 Ansari Road, Darya Ganj, New Delhi 110 002 Phone 23282060,

Mr. Bill Clinton on the Forum in his Latest Book GIVING published in 2007 - Former President of US Mr. Bill Clinton reference in his book GIVING published in September 2007 aptly testifies the services of the Founder, President WWF ‘Jaya Arunachalam’ who has empowered 800,000 women over the last 29 years through microcredit, political involvement, access to education and healthcare for their children.

== See also ==
- Jaya Arunachalam
- Hillary Clinton
