= Cadjan =

Woven mats made from coconut palm leaves

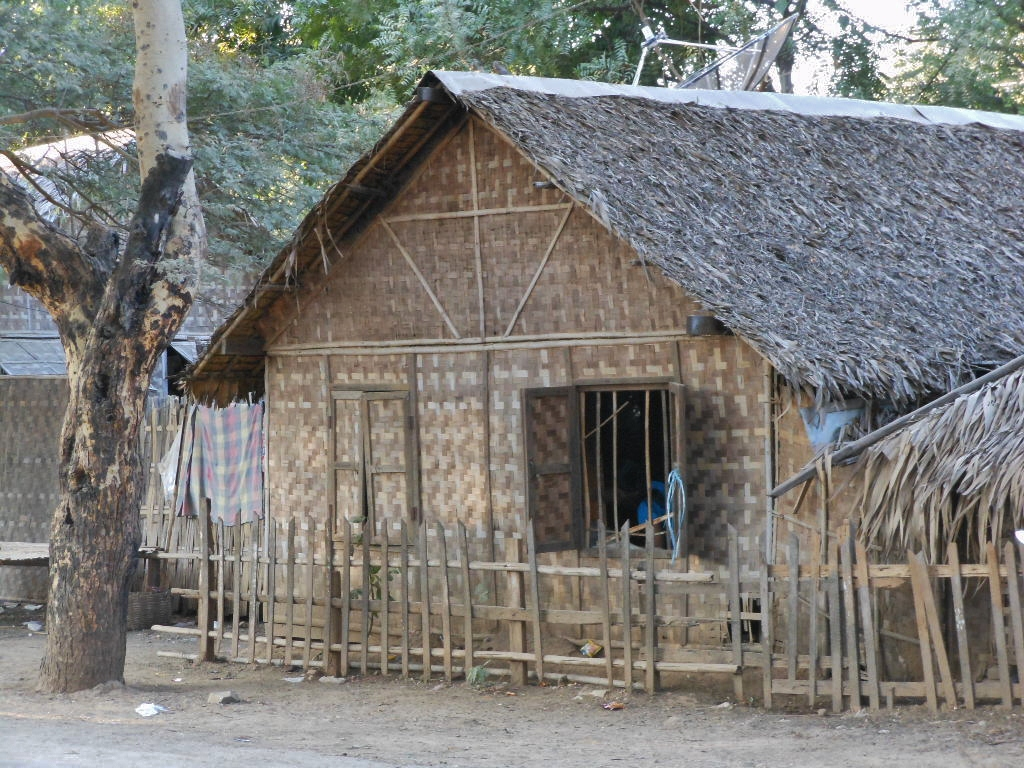
A cadjan house in Myanmar

Cadjan are woven mats made from coconut palm leaves, used for roofing and walls. Cadjan houses were available in many Asian countries in past, but with development these houses are now limited to very rural areas in India, Sri Lanka and a few other Asian countries.

Dwellings constructed from cadjan has been shown to be worse at preventing mosquitos, and thus increasing the risk of malaria, when compared to more expensive building materials.

The material is used in the construction of kilns for drying copra. Used instead of brickwork or sheet metal because it allows a more even flow of air, when compared to using ventilation holes.
