= Shashi Kant =

Director General (Prisons) Punjab Police
- In office 28 October 2011 – 30 June 2012

Director General (Armed Forces) Punjab Police
- In office 11 January 2011 – 28 October 2011

Director General (Home Guard) Punjab Police
- In office 27 November 2009 – 11 January 2011

Director General (Central Police Office) Punjab Police
- In office 6 November 2009 – 27 November 2009

Personal details
- Born: 24 June 1954 (age 71) Bareilly, India
- Occupation: Bureaucrat & Social Activist
- Known for: opposing narcotics and corruption

Shashi Kant is a 1977 batch, Punjab cadre Indian Police Service (IPS) officer who has served in several positions in his career before retiring in 2012 as Director General of Police (DGP). He was the Director General (Prisons), Punjab, India from October 2011 to June 2012.

== Post-retirement ==
The former DGP is known for his crusade against Illegal drug trade in the state of Punjab and has named several senior Ministers who are patronizing drugs. In 2012 he took part in the Indian anti-corruption movement led by social activist Anna Hazare.
