= Pune Metro =

Rapid transit in Pune

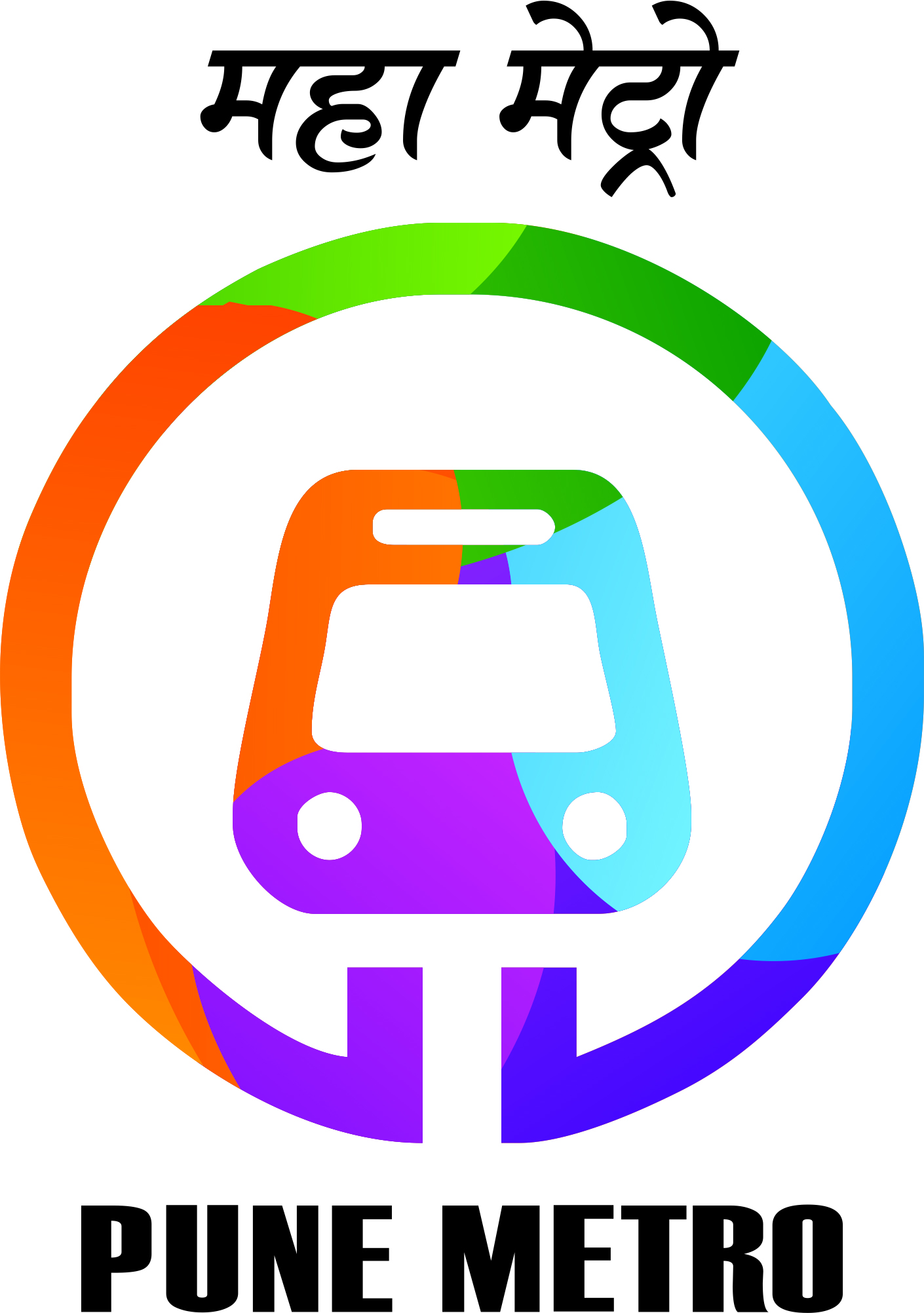

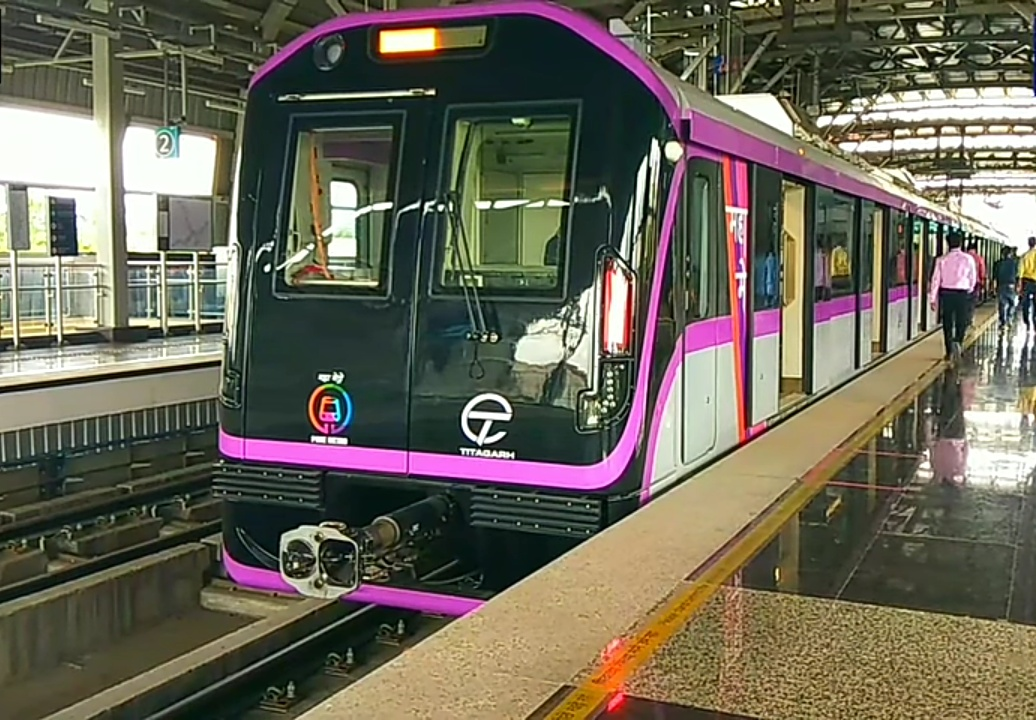
- An aluminium train set manufactured by Titagarh Rail Systems for the Pune Metro.

Overview
- Owner: Maha Metro
- Area served: Pune Metropolitan Region
- Locale: Pune
- Transit type: Rapid Transit
- Number of lines: Operational: 3; Under-construction: 1
- Line number: 1 2 3
- Number of stations: Operational: 44 (Note: Interchange stations are counted only once. There is 1 triple interchange station. If added the number goes up to 46 stations); Under construction: 56
- Annual ridership: 9,302,891 (2023)
- Chief executive: Maha Metro: Shravan Hardikar, MD; PMRDA: Suhas Diwase, IAS, CEO; Pune Metro: Alok Kapoor, CEO
- Website: Maha Metro: punemetrorail.org; PMRDA: punerimetro.in

Operation
- Began operation: 6 March 2022; 4 years ago
- Operator: Maharashtra Metro Rail Corporation Limited
- Character: Elevated and Underground
- Number of vehicles: 34
- Train length: 3 coaches

Technical
- System length: Total Operational: 56.3 km Maha Metro: 33.1 km PMRDA: 23.2 km; Under Construction: 54.53 km (33.88 mi); Proposed: 62.21 km (38.66 mi)
- Track gauge: 1,435 mm (4 ft 8 1/2 in) standard gauge
- Electrification: 25 kV 50 Hz AC overhead catenary (Purple and Aqua Line); 750 V DC Third rail (Pink Line)
- Average speed: 40 km/h (estd.)
- Top speed: 80 km/h

Pune Metro is a mass rapid transit system serving the city of Pune and the Pune Metropolitan Region in India. As of November 2026, the system consists of three lines with a combined length of 56.3 km (35.0 mi). It is the eighth-largest metro network in India and second largest in the state of Maharashtra, behind Mumbai Metro serving 44 stations.

Pune Metro was inaugurated on 6 March 2022. The 16.59 km (10.31 mi) Purple Line from PCMC Bhavan to Swargate runs on an elevated viaduct between PCMC Bhavan and Range Hills, from where it goes underground. The Aqua Line runs from Vanaz to Ramwadi covering a distance of 14.66 km (9.11 mi) on an elevated viaduct. The 23.2 km (14.4 mi) elevated Line 3 Puneri Metro runs from the Rajiv Gandhi Infotech Park in Hinjawadi via Balewadi to Civil Court. All three lines interchange at District Court station.

The foundation stone for the Purple and Aqua lines was laid by prime minister Narendra Modi in December 2016. The two lines with a combined length of 32.97 km (20.49 mi) are being implemented by the Maharashtra Metro Rail Corporation Limited (MahaMetro), a 50:50 joint venture of the state and central governments. Sections of the purple and aqua lines were inaugurated in March 2022. Additional sections on both lines became operational in August 2023. Line 3 Puneri Metro is being implemented by Pune Metropolitan Region Development Authority (PMRDA) and is a joint venture of Tata Projects and Siemens Pune IT City Metro Rail Limited on a public–private partnership basis. While the foundation stone for Line 3 was laid in December 2018, construction could only commence in November 2021 due to delays in land acquisition. Prime Minister Narendra Modi laid the foundation stone of Phase-II of Pune Metro, to be developed at an estimated cost of around ₹13,500 crore on 3rd November 2026. Phase-II comprises Pune Metro Lines 2A, 2B, 4 and 4A.

Currently Maha Metro provides service on two major routes: from Swargate to PCMC and from Vanaz to Ramwadi. During the busy morning and evening periods (8-11 AM and 4-8 PM), the wait time between trains has been reduced from 7.5 to 7 minutes. This change adds four additional trips to each route, bringing the total to 117 trips on the Pimpri Chinchwad to District Court route and 118 trips on the Vanaz to Ramwadi route.

== Background ==
Pune has witnessed enormous industrial growth since the 1990s. Rapid urbanisation in the recent past has put the city's travel infrastructure in stress. With an increase in small scale, medium scale as well as heavy industries, the traffic in the city is rising at alarming rates. The roads in the city, cater to various kinds of vehicles simultaneously. Such roads, at an optimum can carry 8,000 peak hour peak direction traffic (PHPDT). Being a densely populated area, Pune's traffic needs cannot be met by road-based system and additional flyovers. Pune Mahanagar Parivahan Mahamandal Ltd. (PMPML), the public transport provider that operates buses and BRT services in Pune has failed to meet the transport needs. This has mainly contributed to an unhealthy growth of vehicles on roads. According to reports published in April 2018, the number of vehicles registered in the city stands at 3.62 million surpassing the population of the city. Such a high density of traffic has put the urban transport system in Pune under severe stress leading to longer travel time, increased air pollution and rise in number of road accidents. In light of this, a strong public transport system has been discussed in Pune since the early 2000s. Initially, Skybus Metro, a prototype suspended railway system developed by the Konkan Railways, was being considered on a 7.5 km (4.66 mi) route between Swargate and Pune Railway Station. However, following a tragic mishap in September 2004, the project took a back seat.

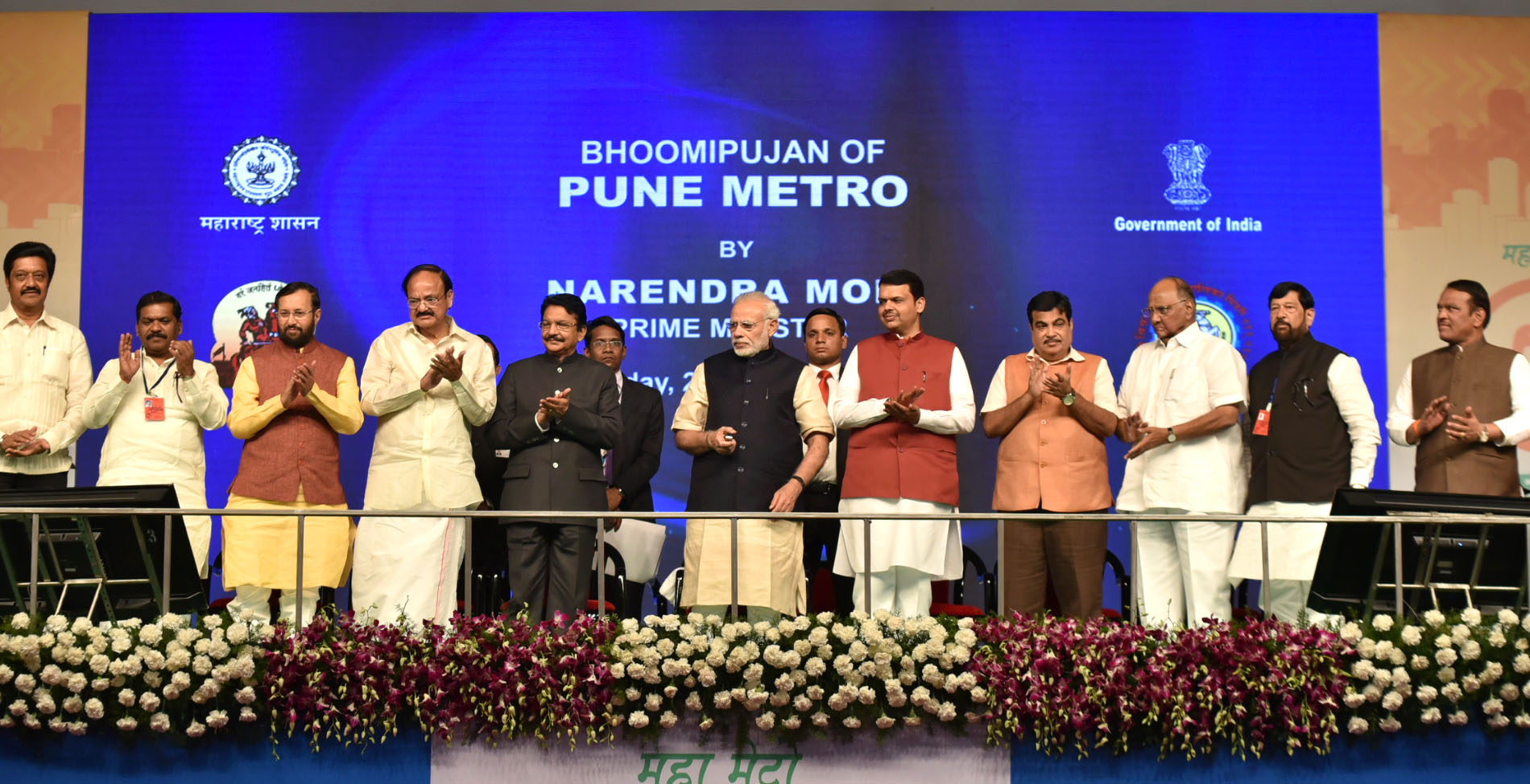
Prime minister Narendra Modi laying foundation stone of the Pune Metro Project (Phase 1) in 2016.

On 15 August 2008, the preparation of Detailed Project Report (DPR) work was undertaken by the Delhi Metro Rail Corporation (DMRC) and submitted their report. In 2010, the Pune Municipal Corporation (PMC) delayed submitting the proposal to the Union government to make provisions in the annual budget for the project. The initial project consisting of two lines with a combined length of 31.25 km (19.42 mi) was approved by the State in June 2012. However, it received the final approval from the Central Government only on 7 December 2016, almost 4.5 years later. PM Narendra Modi laid the foundation stone on 24 December 2016. MahaMetro is implementing the two lines, viz. the partly elevated and partly underground Purple line from Pimpri & Chinchwad to Swargate and the completely elevated Aqua line from Vanaz to Ramwadi. MahaMetro expects to complete the project in 2021. Days after the foundation stone for the MahaMetro lines was laid, PMRDA approved Line 3 (Hinjawadi Phase-I, II, III - Shivajinagar) on 29 December 2016. The project will be implemented by PMRDA on a PPP basis. It was approved by the State on 2 January 2018 and by the Centre on 7 March 2018.

== Construction Phases ==
=== Phase 1 ===
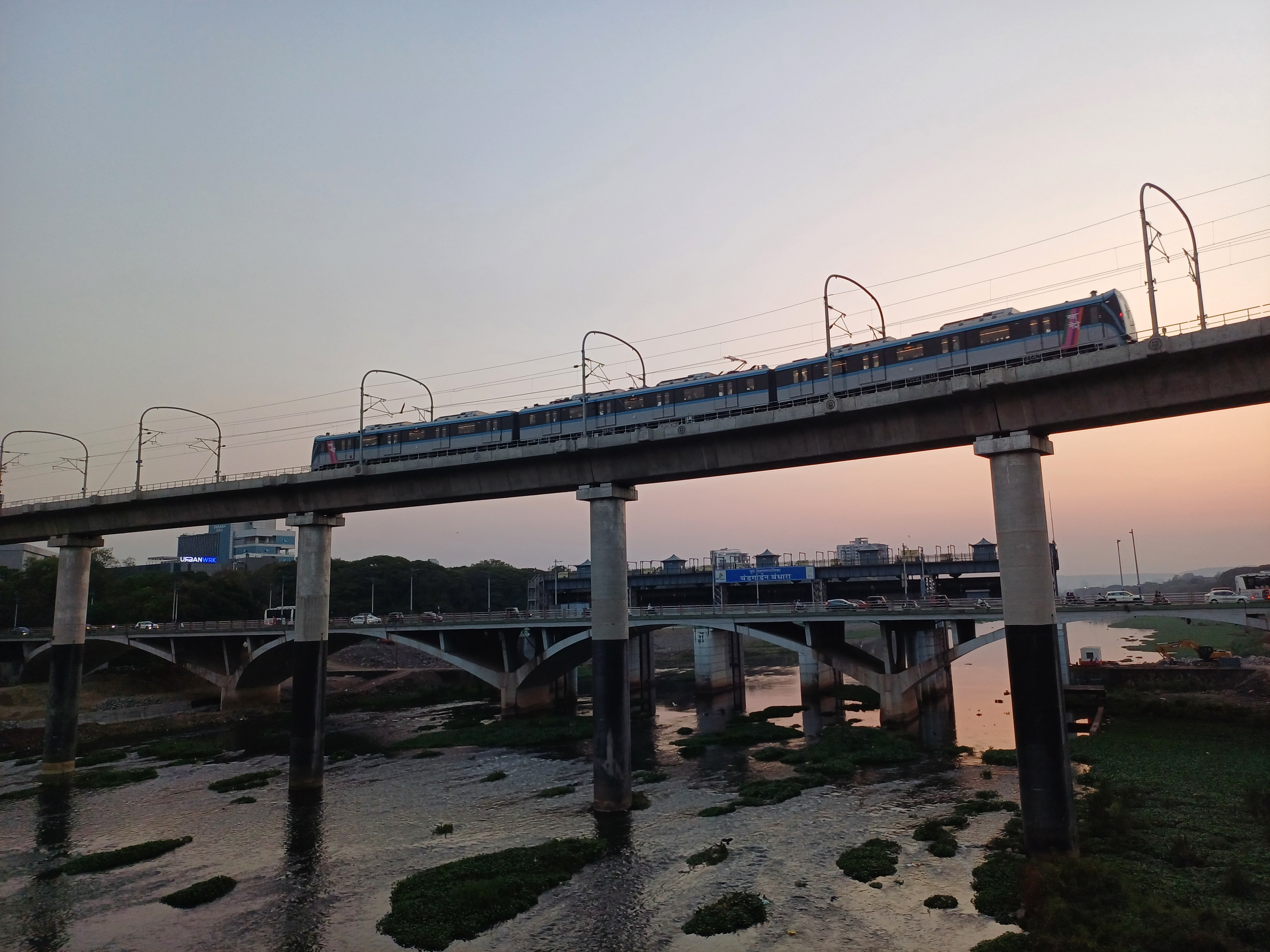
Metro as seen from Fitzgerald Bridge, Pune

The Delhi Metro Rail Cooperation (DMRC) began preparing a Detailed Project Report (DPR) for Pune Metro Phase 1. The DPR was submitted to the state government in July 2009 and received approval from the government on 12 June 2012. However, the project immediately ran into problems with various organizations demanding the alignment to be changed and environmental problems. At an event in 2013 during his tour of the city, E. Sreedharan blamed the people involved in planning and implementing the project for the long delay, stating that "Pune lost five valuable years in unnecessary discussions instead of executing the project." In light of the various issues and revisions in cost the DPR was revised January 2013, August 2014, and once again in November 2015 to reflect current prices.

The project received a final approval from the Union Government’s Cabinet on 7 December 2016 and in January 2017, Nagpur Metro Rail Corporation Ltd. (NMRCL) was renamed to Maharashtra Metro Rail Corporation Ltd. (Maha-Metro) to execute Pune Metro’s Phase 1 project.

Phase 1 consists of two lines, the Purple line, running from PCMC Bhavan to Swargate, and the Aqua line, running from Vanaz to Ramwadi. The estimated cost for Phase 1, then spanning a length of 31.254 km (19.420 mi) was ₹11,420 crore (equivalent to ₹150 billion or US$1.7 billion in 2026). The two lines comprise a total of 42.84 km (26.62 mi) (including approved extensions).

==== Line 1 (Purple Line) ====
The construction officially commenced in May 2017. The maintenance depot for this line will be located near the Range Hills station on the land acquired from the College of Agriculture. The 5.09 km (3.16 mi) long underground section of Purple Line from Agriculture College to Swargate is being carried out in two packages: 1. Agriculture college to Budhwar Peth; 2. Budhwar Peth to Swargate. Mahametro has invited separate tenders for these two packages each involving the design and construction of the stations and associated tunnels. The following firms submitted bids: L&T, Tata Projects-Gulermark JV, Shanghai Tunnel Engineering, J Kumar and Afcons. The underground station at Swargate will be a part of a multimodal transit hub integrating intra- and inter-city bus services run by PMPML and MSRTC, autorickshaws, as well as parking facility for private vehicles. The project is being undertaken by MahaMetro on a PPP basis at a cost of ₹1,600 crore (equivalent to ₹23 billion or US$250 million in 2026). In August 2018, J Kumar Infraprojects was awarded the contract for the hub. In April 2018, MahaMetro began construction in the Kharalwadi and Morwadi area on the elevated stretch of the line between PCMC Bhavan and Range Hills. For the construction, the barricades on the newly built BRTS lane were removed. MahaMetro claimed it to be temporary and revealed that an earlier plan to construct the pillars on the footpath was dropped due to utility lines running below the surface. However, the PCMC conducted trials on the BRTS route in April 2018 and intended to launch services soon and therefore ordered MahaMetro to stop construction. As a result, MahaMetro revised the alignment in May 2018, one month after construction began on the line.

===== Line 1A (Purple Line Extension) =====
Ever since the Centre gave its nod for the first two metro corridors, there has been a demand for extending the Purple line from PCMC Bhavan to Bhakti Shakti Chowk, Nigdi. In light of these demands, PCMC decided to prepare DPRs for the extensions in their respective jurisdictions and bear the cost for it. However, on 18 January 2018, MLA and Pune's Guardian Minister Girish Bapat announced in his speech at the ground-breaking ceremony for the first metro station at Sant Tukaram Nagar that work on the extension would be taken up only in the "second phase" of the project without mentioning a timeline. As a result, confusion ensued and social organizations in Pimpri, Chinchwad, Akurdi held a token hunger strike in February 2018 to press their demand for extension. In April 2018, PCMC earmarked a sum of ₹50 crore (equivalent to ₹73 crore or US$7.8 million in 2026) so that MahaMetro could prepare a DPR for the Nigdi extension. In October 2018, MahaMetro submitted the DPR for the 4.5 km (2.80 mi) long extension to the PCMC with an estimated cost of ₹947 crore (US$100 million). The DPR was approved by the state in February 2021 was awaiting the nod from the centre. In October 2023, the centre approved the extension of the route from PCMC to Bhakti Shakti Chowk in Nigdi. MahaMetro had started the soil testing and basic works for setup of foundation pillars by June 2024. The work on the extension is expected to be completed by mid 2027.

===== Line 1B (Purple Line Extension) =====
There have also been demands for extending the line from Swargate to Katraj. The DPR prepared by MahaMetro for the 5.4 km (3.36 mi) long extension was approved by the PMC in September 2021. The extension is planned to be entirely underground and will have 3 stations at Gultekdi market yard, Padmavati and Katraj. The extension was expected to cost ₹4,020 crore (US$430 million). On 16 August 2024, the extension from Swargate to Katraj was approved by the Government of India. Named as Line–1B, this section will include three underground stations on a 5.46 km long route and is estimated to cost ₹2,954.53 crore (US$320 million). The official ground breaking ceremony took place on 29 September 2024 and is anticipated to be completed by February 2029. In December 2024, the Pune Municipal Corporation and MahaMetro mutually decided to construct a fourth metro station on this route at Balajinagar.

==== Line 2 (Aqua Line) ====
The maintenance depot for the Aqua line is located near the Vanaz station on the former garbage depot land. In November 2015, a revised proposal submitted to the PMC by the DMRC suggested realigning the route along the Mutha river as against the earlier alignment along Jangali Maharaj Road to reduce the project cost. The route length now is 14.66 km (9.11 mi), reducing the length by 260 m (853 ft 0 in). The alignment of Line 2 was once again revised in January 2018 due to Indian Railways' expansion plans. In September 2018, the National Monument Authority rejected permission sought by MahaMetro to build near Aga Khan Palace in the prohibited area of the monument. No construction is permitted within 100 m (328 ft 1 in) of a monument under AMASR Act, 1958. This led to a third revision in the alignment of line 2, for which MahaMetro has suggested the PMC three alternative alignments for the Civil Court to Ramwadi section near the monument. A diversion from Kalyani Nagar which increased the route length by 60 m (196 ft 10 in) and the cost by ₹135 crore (equivalent to ₹197 crore or US$21 million in 2026) was approved. Although the Aqua line currently terminates at Vanaz in the west, it was decided to extend the line till Chandani Chowk. The decision came in February 2018, when a longstanding dispute over the erstwhile garbage depot land in Kothrud was resolved by allotting it to MahaMetro for the development of a metro depot. A permanent exhibition depicting the life of Shivaji - the Shivsrushti (Marathi: शिवसृष्टी) project - which was also planned at the same location, will instead be built on the land reserved for a biodiversity park near Chandani Chowk. The station at Chandani Chowk will bear the name of the Shivsrushti project. A DPR is being prepared for the 2 km (1.24 mi) long extension and an additional station between Vanaz and Shivsrushti (Chandani Chowk) at Bhusari Colony is being contemplated. MahaMetro will bear the costs for this extension. There have been demands for the extension of the line from Ramwadi to the Pune International Airport.

==== Line 3 (Pink Line) ====
The construction will be taken up in three phases, the section between Hinjawadi and Balewadi is expected to be taken up first followed by the section between Balewadi and Civil Court, Shivajinagar. A metro car shed will be built in Maan, Hinjawadi. The MIDC will provide 55 acres (22 ha) of land in Hinjawadi for setting up a Metro rail depot. The line will also connect to the multimodal transit hub planned along the National Highway 48 in Balewadi which will integrate the inter- and intra-city bus services and BRTS operated by the MSRTC and PMPML. The hub will be constructed on a PPP basis under the Smart City mission and is expected to cost ₹1,251 crore (US$130 million). The hub will consist of a built-up space of 1,900,000 square feet (176,516 m^{2}) including 1,750,000 square feet (162,580 m^{2}) of commercial office space, parking space for 80 buses, 1942 cars and 3884 two-wheelers. As of October 2018, offers from international and national real estate developers have been invited for the hub and the PMC is in the process of land transfer to the executing agency, Pune Smart City Development Corporation Ltd. (PSCDCL). PMRDA has announced that the line would be extended from the Civil Court intersection up to Phursungi IT Park via Hadapsar. The DPR for the extension is being prepared by DMRC. This would add another 11.8 km (7.33 mi) of elevated corridor to the network and 12 additional stations.

Phase 1 network (includes Ph 1 extension)
| No. | Line Name | Terminals | | Stations | Length | Status | Opening Date |
|---|---|---|---|---|---|---|---|
| 1 | Purple Line | | | | | | |
| 1 | Purple Line | Bhakti Shakti | PCMC Bhavan | 4 | 4.5 km (2.8 mi) | Under Construction | 2027 |
| 1 | Purple Line | PCMC Bhavan | Phugewadi | 5 | 5.87 km (3.65 mi) | Completed | 6 March 2022 |
| 1 | Purple Line | Phugewadi | District Court | 4 | 8.03 km (4.99 mi) | Completed | 1 August 2023 |
| 1 | Purple Line | Khadki | | 1 | 8.03 km (4.99 mi) | Completed | 21 June 2025 |
| 1 | Purple Line | Range Hills | | 1 | 8.03 km (4.99 mi) | Under Construction | January 2027 |
| 1 | Purple Line | District Court | Swargate | 3 | 3.33 km (2.07 mi) | Completed | 29 September 2024 |
| 1 | Purple Line | Swargate | Katraj | 5 | 5.46 km (3.39 mi) | Under construction | 2028 |
| 2 | Aqua Line | Vanaz | Garware College | 5 | 4.35 km (2.70 mi) | Completed | 6 March 2022 |
| 2 | Aqua Line | Garware College | Ruby Hall Clinic | 7 | 5.45 km (3.39 mi) | Completed | 1 August 2023 |
| 2 | Aqua Line | Ruby Hall Clinic | Ramwadi | 3 | 5.94 km (3.69 mi) | Completed | 6 March 2024 |
| 2 | Aqua Line | Yerwada | | 1 | 5.94 km (3.69 mi) | Completed | 21 August 2024 |
| 3 | Pink Line | Maan | District Court | 17 | 23.2 km (14.4 mi) | Completed | 3 November 2026 |
| 3 | Pink Line | Balewadi Phata; Baner Gaon; Shivaji Nagar | | 3 | 23.2 km (14.4 mi) | Under Construction | December 2026 |
| 3 | Pink Line | Balewadi High Street; Baner Pashan Link Road; Bhosalenagar-RBI | | 3 | 23.2 km (14.4 mi) | Under Construction | 2027 |
| Total | | | | 62 | 66.3 km (41.2 mi) | | |

=== Phase 2 ===
Pune Metro has started the preparation for the second phase of the metro. The routes from Khadakwasla to Kharadi via Swargate and Hadapsar metro rail route (25.862 km (16.070 mi)), Paudphata to Manikbaug via Warje route (6.118 km (3.802 mi)), Vanaz to Chandni Chowk route of (1.112) km and Ramwadi to Wagholi route of (11.633 km (7.228 mi)) have been approved by Pune Municipal Corporation. The Detailed Project Report is further sent to state and center government for approval.

The Union Cabinet approved Pune Metro Phase 2 in June 2025, comprising two elevated corridors, Line 2A from Vanaz to Chandani Chowk and Line 2B from Ramwadi to Wagholi/Vitthalwadi ,spanning 12.75 km with 13 stations at an estimated cost of ₹3,626.24 crore.

Phase 2 network
| No. | Line Name | Terminals | | Stations | Distance | Status | Opening Date |
|---|---|---|---|---|---|---|---|
| 1 | Aqua Line | Chandni Chowk | Vanaz | 2 | 1.12 km (0.70 mi) | Under construction | 2029 |
| 1 | Aqua Line | Ramwadi | Vitthalwadi | 11 | 11.63 km (7.23 mi) | Approved | 2029 |
| 2 | Orange Line | Khadakwasla | Kharadi | 22 | 25.8 km (16.0 mi) | Approved | |
| 3 | Orange Line A | Nal Stop | Warje | 6 | 6 km (3.7 mi) | Approved | |
| 4 | Orange Line B | Hadapsar | Loni Kalbhor | 10 | 11.35 km (7.05 mi) | State Approved | |
| 5 | Orange Line C | Hadapsar Bus Depot | Saswad Railway | 4 | 5.57 km (3.46 mi) | State Approved | |
| 6 | Line 5 | Bhakti Shakti | Chakan | 31 | 41 km (25 mi) | DPR Submitted | |
| Total | | | | 86 | 102.47 km (63.67 mi) | | |

== Lines ==
=== Maha Metro and PMRDA ===
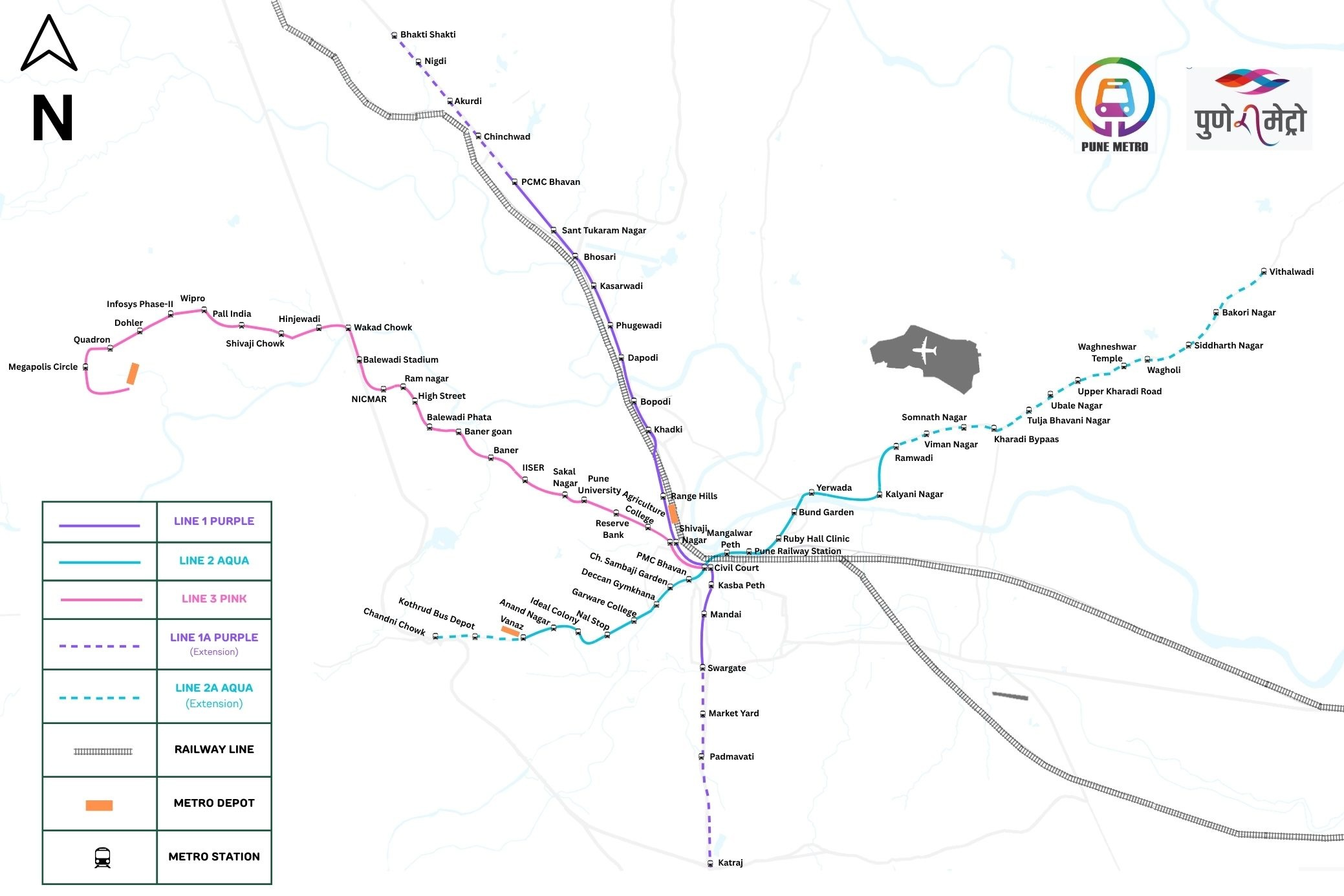
Metro map of Pune

In Pune's metro rail development, PMRDA and Maha Metro are two separate entities with different roles and responsibilities, which is why they operate separately. The Pune Metropolitan Region Development Authority (PMRDA) had proposed to take over the Metro project, which was declined by the PMC and PCMC. The opposing representatives said that the Metro rail is going to be implemented by Special Purpose Vehicle. Instead, the civic bodies suggested inclusion of PMRDA in the SPV to increase the reach of the Metro rail. PMRDA will execute only Line 3 i.e. Shivajinagar to Hinjawadi (Phase-I, II, III) line. They will follow PPP model for the project. For the implementation of the initial two lines, the former Nagpur Metro Rail Corporation was reconstituted to form Maharashtra Metro Rail Corporation Limited (MahaMetro). Maha Metro operates in core urban areas (within PMC and PCMC), while PMRDA covers wider metropolitan areas.

=== Purple Line (Line 1) ===
Purple Line runs from PCMC Bhavan in Pimpri to Swargate. The 16.59 km (10.31 mi) line is elevated till Range Hills with 9 stations and goes underground up to Swargate with 5 stations. This line was designed to connect the industrial and residential zones of Pimpri-Chinchwad in the northwest with the central business districts of Shivaji Nagar and Swargate in Pune. The route begins at PCMC Bhavan station in Pimpri-Chinchwad and passes through key areas such as Sant Tukaram Nagar, Nashik Phata, Kasarwadi, Bhosari, Khadki, Range Hills, and Shivajinagar, before entering the underground stretch that leads to the terminal station at Swargate. This line is crucial for easing traffic congestion on the Old Mumbai–Pune Highway (NH-48) and improving connectivity between the twin cities of Pune and Pimpri-Chinchwad. As of 2024, several sections of the line are operational, with the remainder expected to be completed in phases. This route runs via Nashik Phata, Khadki and Shivaji Nagar.

Selection of Purple Line stations

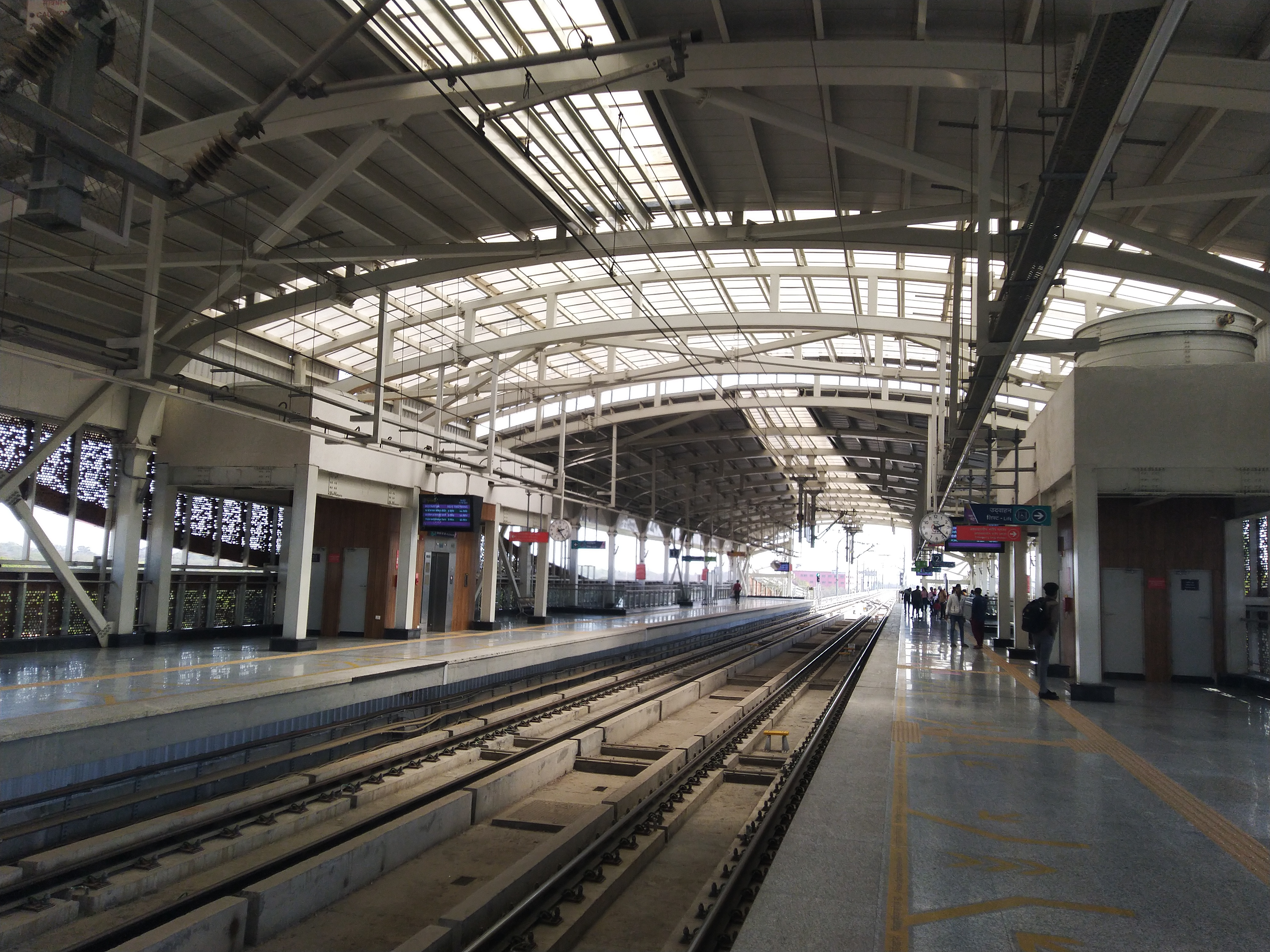
Phugewadi station
(Elevated)

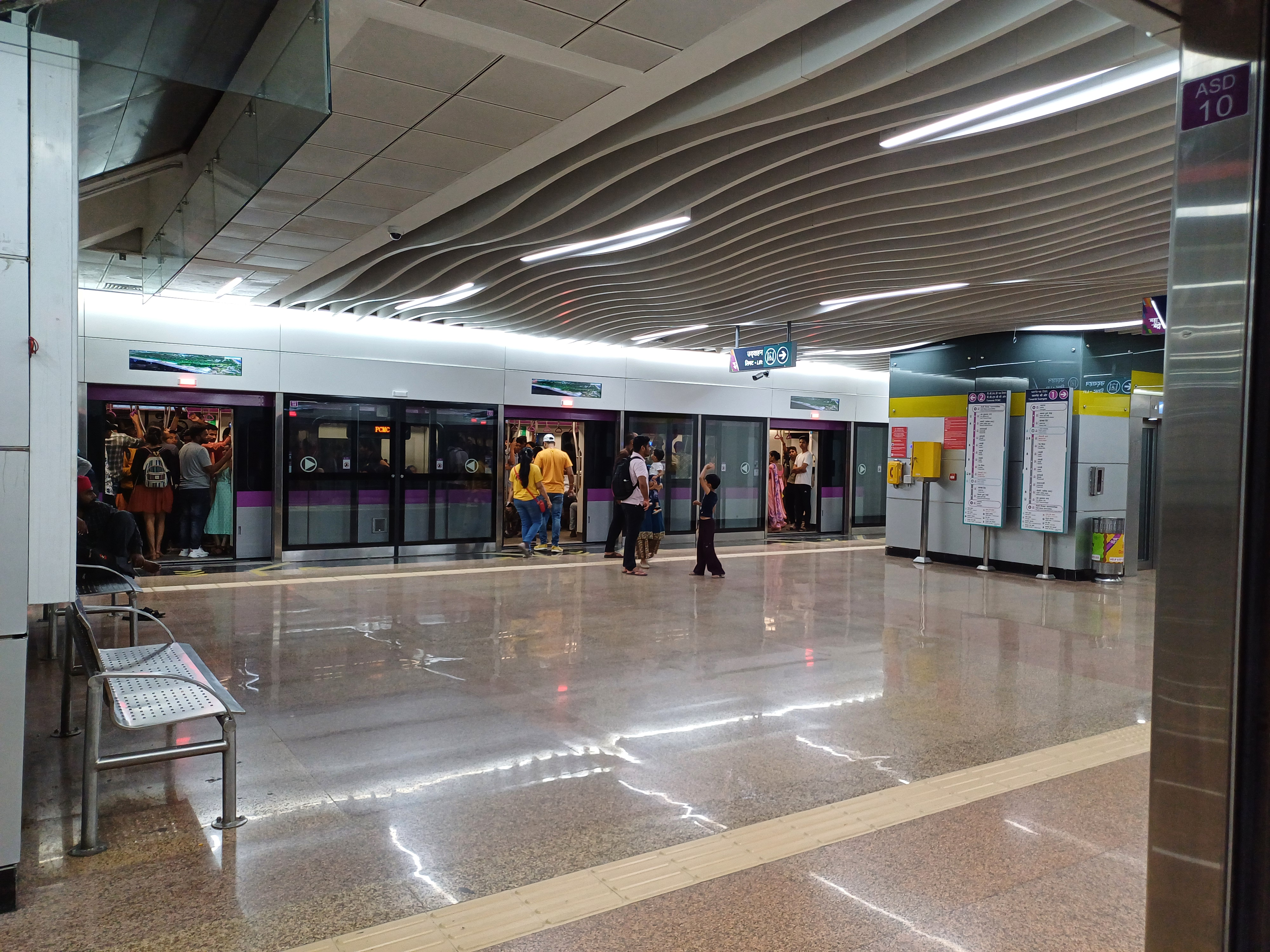
Shivaji Nagar station
(Underground)

District Court Pune station
(Underground)

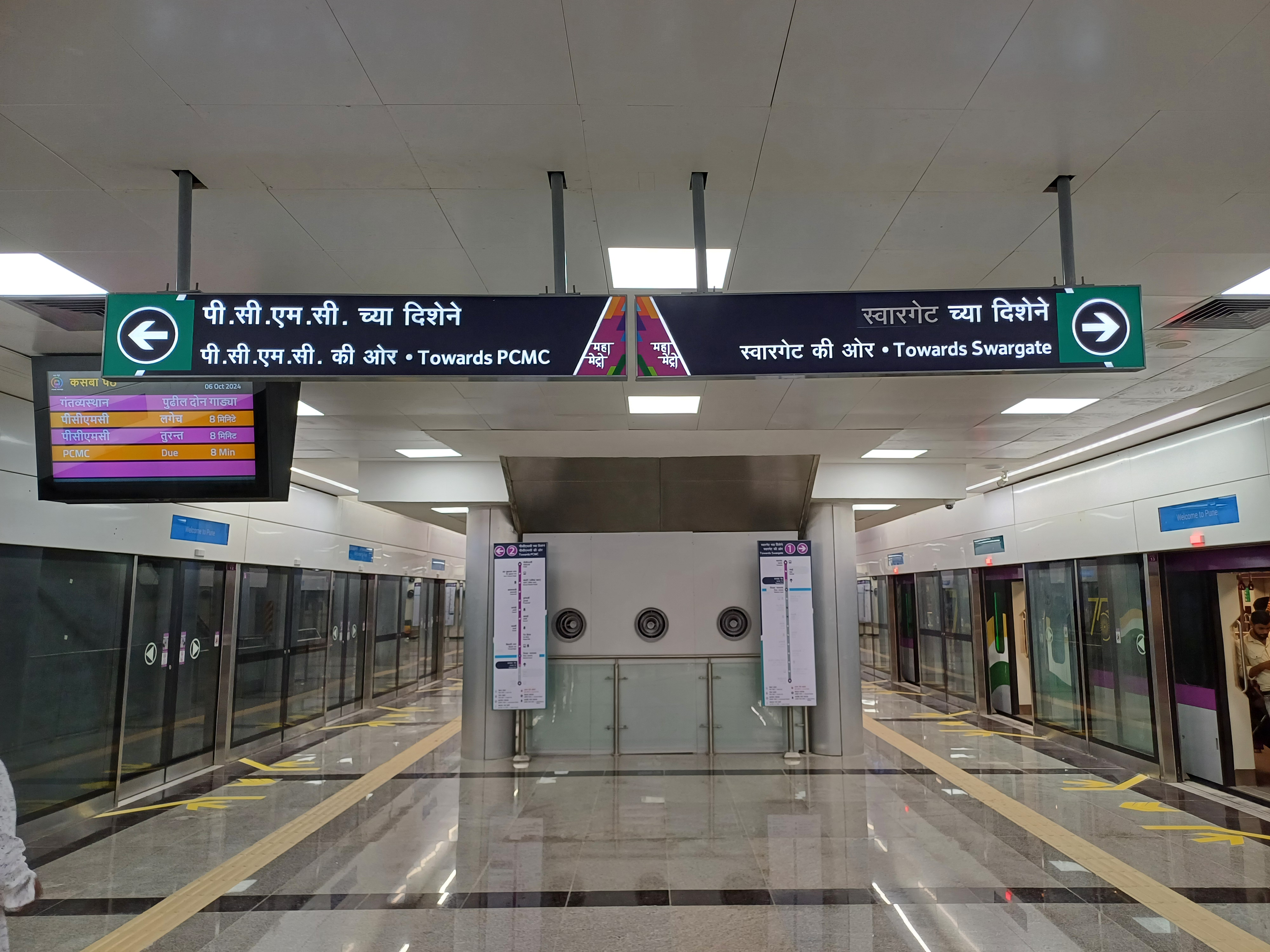
Kasba Peth station
(Underground)

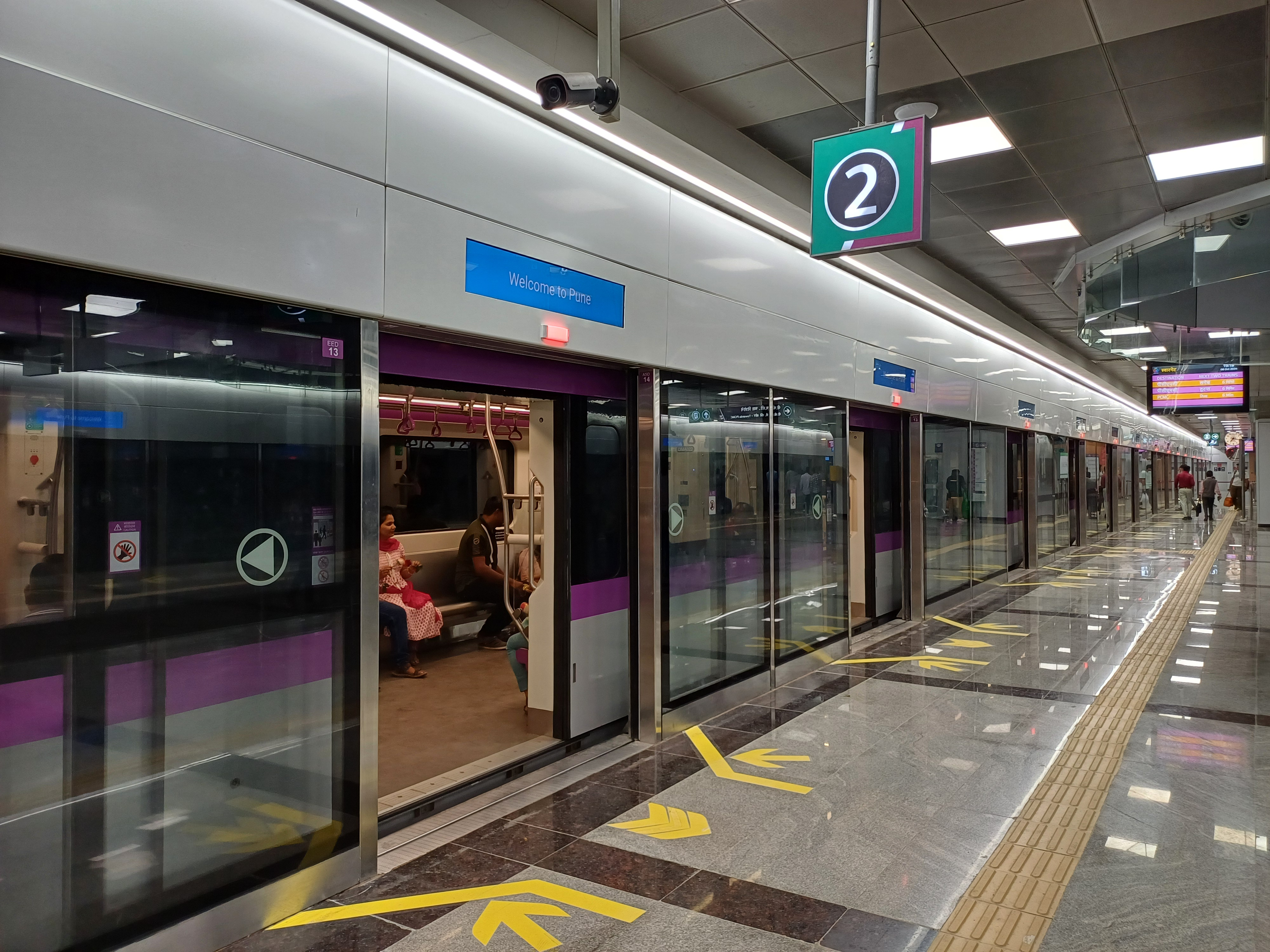
Swargate station
(Underground)

Stations

Here is a list of stations on this Line 1 (Purple Line) with interchange.

Purple Line
| # | Station Name | | Opening | Connections | Layout |
| # | English | Marathi | Opening | Connections | Layout |
|---|---|---|---|---|---|
| 1 | Bhakti Shakti | भक्ती शक्ती | Under Construction | Rainbow BRTS & Line 5 | Elevated |
| 2 | Nigdi | निगडी | Under Construction | Rainbow BRTS | Elevated |
| 3 | Akurdi | आकुर्डी | Under Construction | Akurdi; Rainbow BRTS | Elevated |
| 4 | Chinchwad | चिंचवड | Under Construction | Chinchwad Rainbow BRTS | Elevated |
| 5 | PCMC Bhavan | पिंपरी-चिंचवड महानगरपालिका भवन | 6 March 2022 | Rainbow BRTS | Elevated |
| 6 | Sant Tukaram Nagar | संत तुकाराम नगर | 6 March 2022 | Rainbow BRTS Vallabhnagar MSRTC Bus Station | Elevated |
| 7 | Nashik Phata | नाशिक फाटा | 6 March 2022 | Rainbow BRTS & Line 5 | Elevated |
| 8 | Kasarwadi | कासारवाडी | 6 March 2022 | Kasarwadi Rainbow BRTS | Elevated |
| 9 | Phugewadi | फुगेवाडी | 6 March 2022 | Rainbow BRTS | Elevated |
| 10 | Dapodi | दापोडी | 1 August 2023 | Dapodi Rainbow BRTS | Elevated |
| 11 | Bopodi | बोपोडी | 1 August 2023 | None | Elevated |
| 12 | Khadki | खडकी | 21 June 2025 | Khadki | Elevated |
| 13 | Range Hills | रेंज हिल्स | Under Construction | None | Elevated |
| 14 | Shivaji Nagar | शिवाजी नगर | 1 August 2023 | Shivaji Nagar Shivaji Nagar MSRTC Bus Station & Pink Line (Under Construction) | Underground |
| 15 | District Court Pune | जिल्हा न्यायालय पुणे | 1 August 2023 | Aqua Line & Pink Line | Underground |
| 16 | Kasba Peth | कसबा पेठ | 29 September 2024 | None | Underground |
| 17 | Mahatma Phule Mandai | महात्मा फुले मंडई | 29 September 2024 | None | Underground |
| 18 | Swargate | स्वारगेट | 29 September 2024 | Rainbow BRTS Swargate Bus Station & Line 4 | Underground |
| 19 | Market Yard | मार्केट यार्ड | Under Construction | None | Underground |
| 20 | Bibwewadi | बिबवेवाडी | Under Construction | None | Underground |
| 21 | Padmavati | पद्मावती | Under Construction | None | Underground |
| 22 | Balaji Nagar | बालाजी नगर | Under Construction | None | Underground |
| 23 | Katraj | कात्रज | Under Construction | None | Underground |

=== Aqua Line (Line 2) ===
Aqua line runs from Ramwadi to Vanaz via Mangalwar Peth and Deccan Gymkhana. The line is so named because a section of it passes through the Mula-Mutha river bed. The elevated line covers a distance of 14.66 km (9.11 mi) and has 16 stations. It connects with the Purple line and Pink Line at the District Court interchange station.

Selection of Aqua Line stations

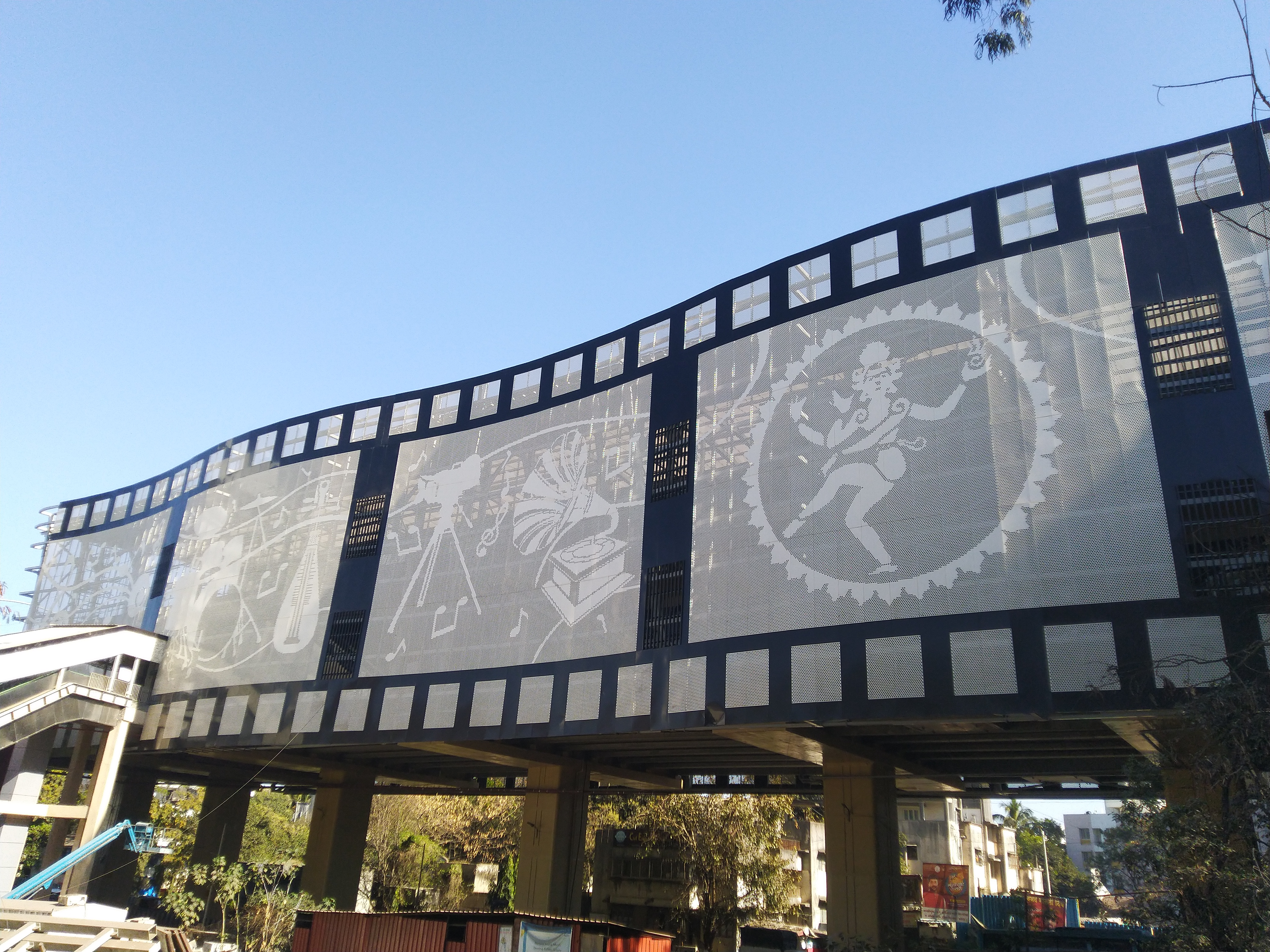
Nal Stop station
(Elevated)

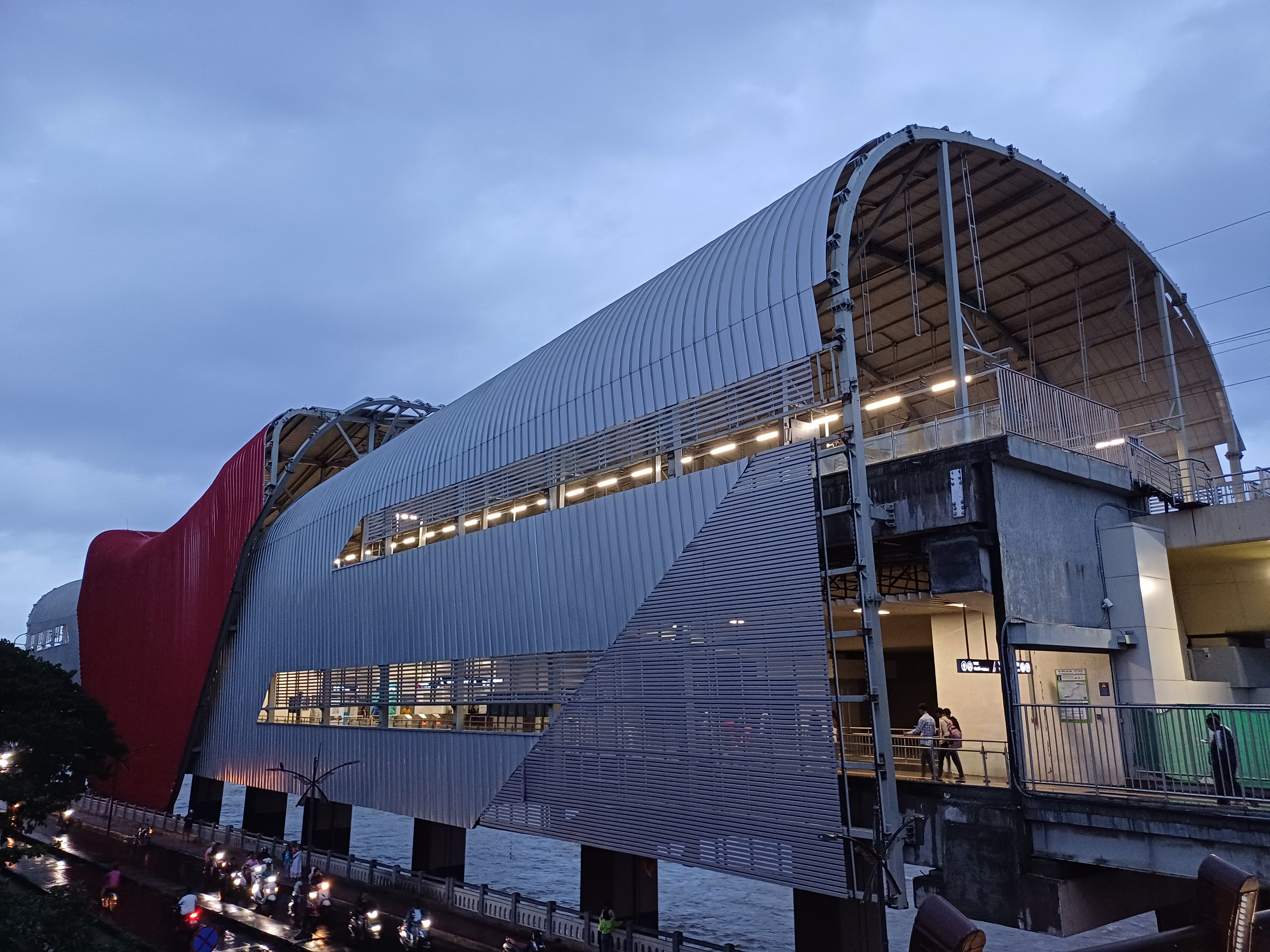
Deccan Gymkhana station
(Elevated)

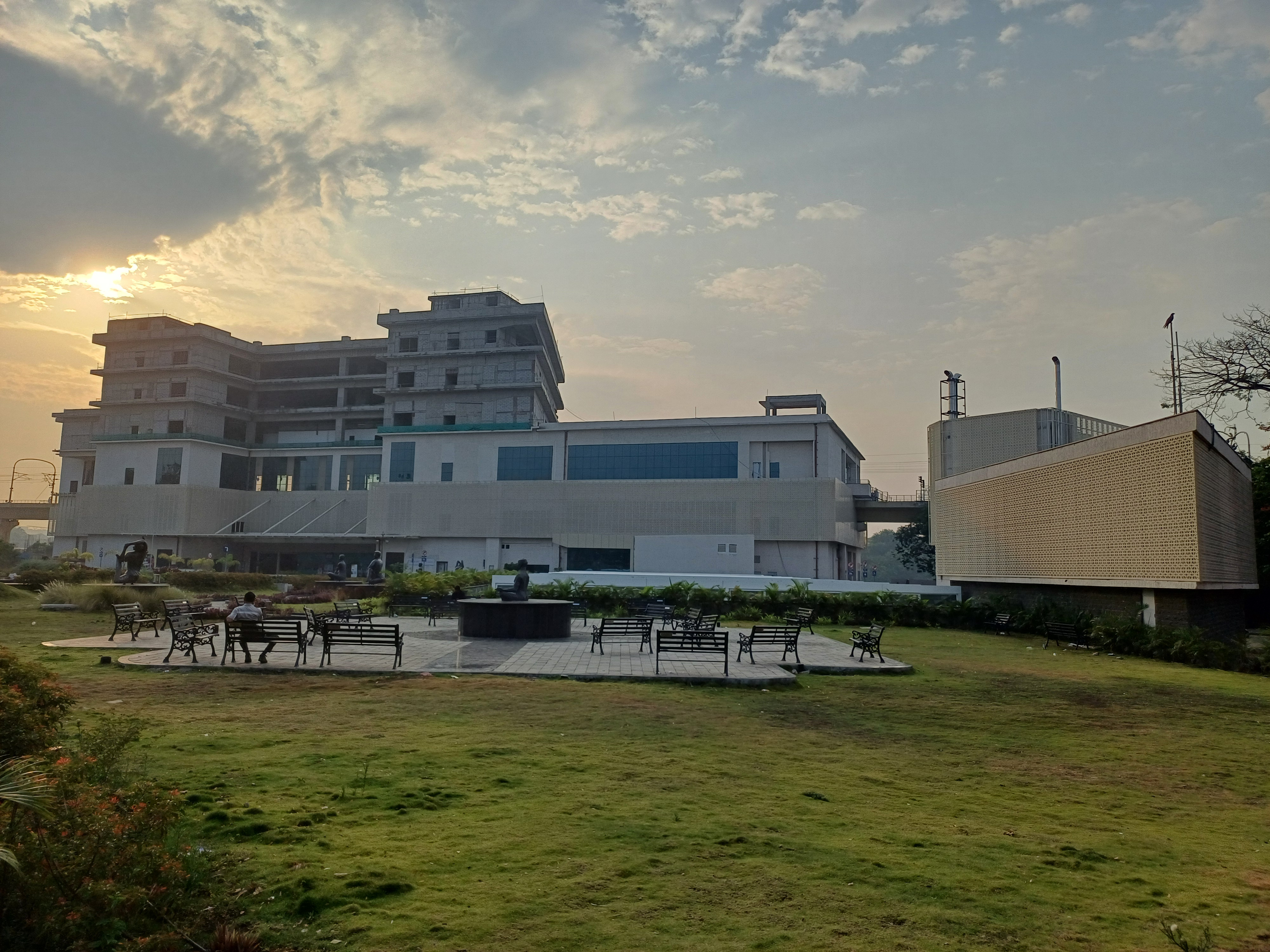
District Court station
(Elevated)

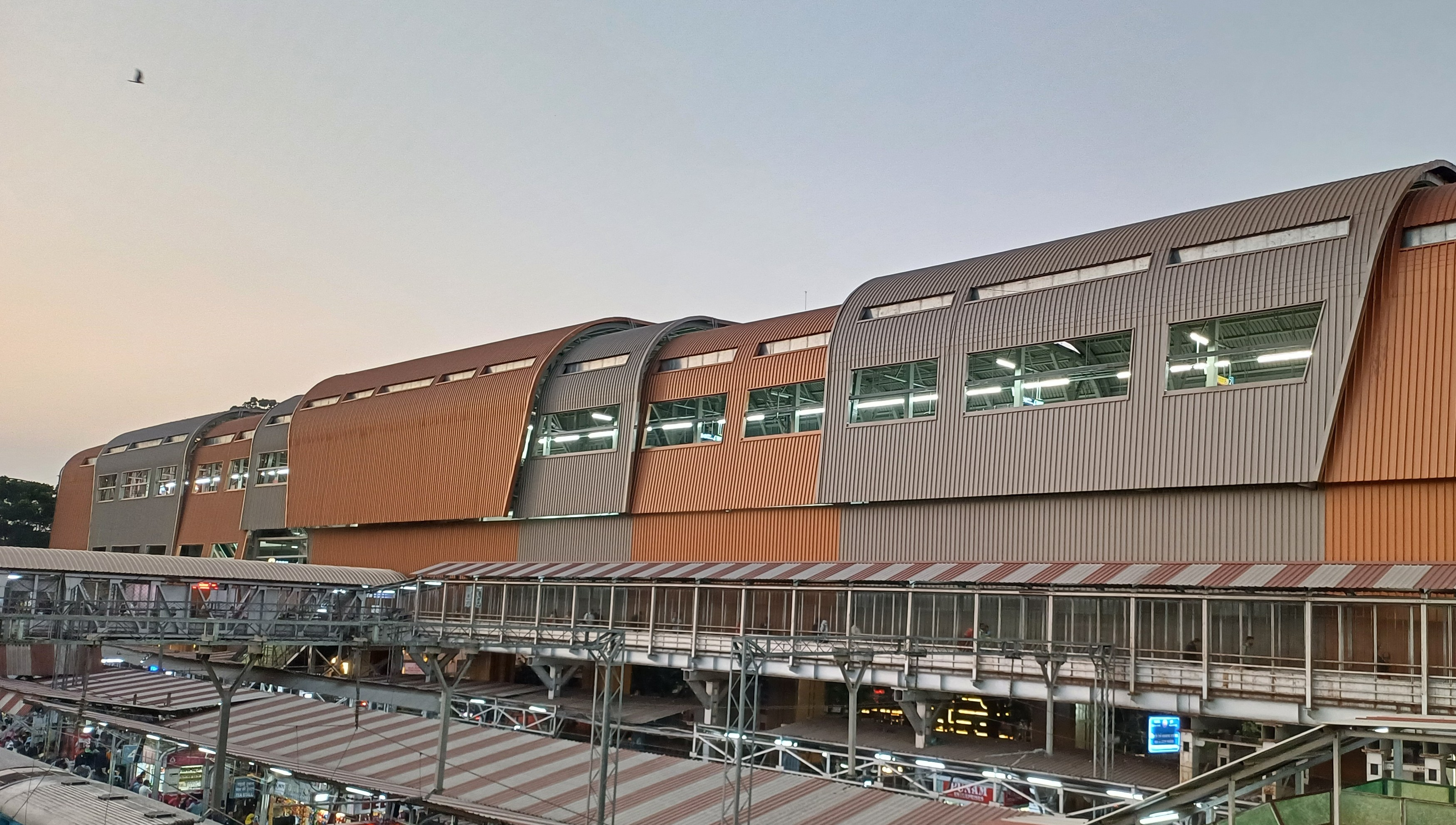
Pune Railway station
(Elevated)

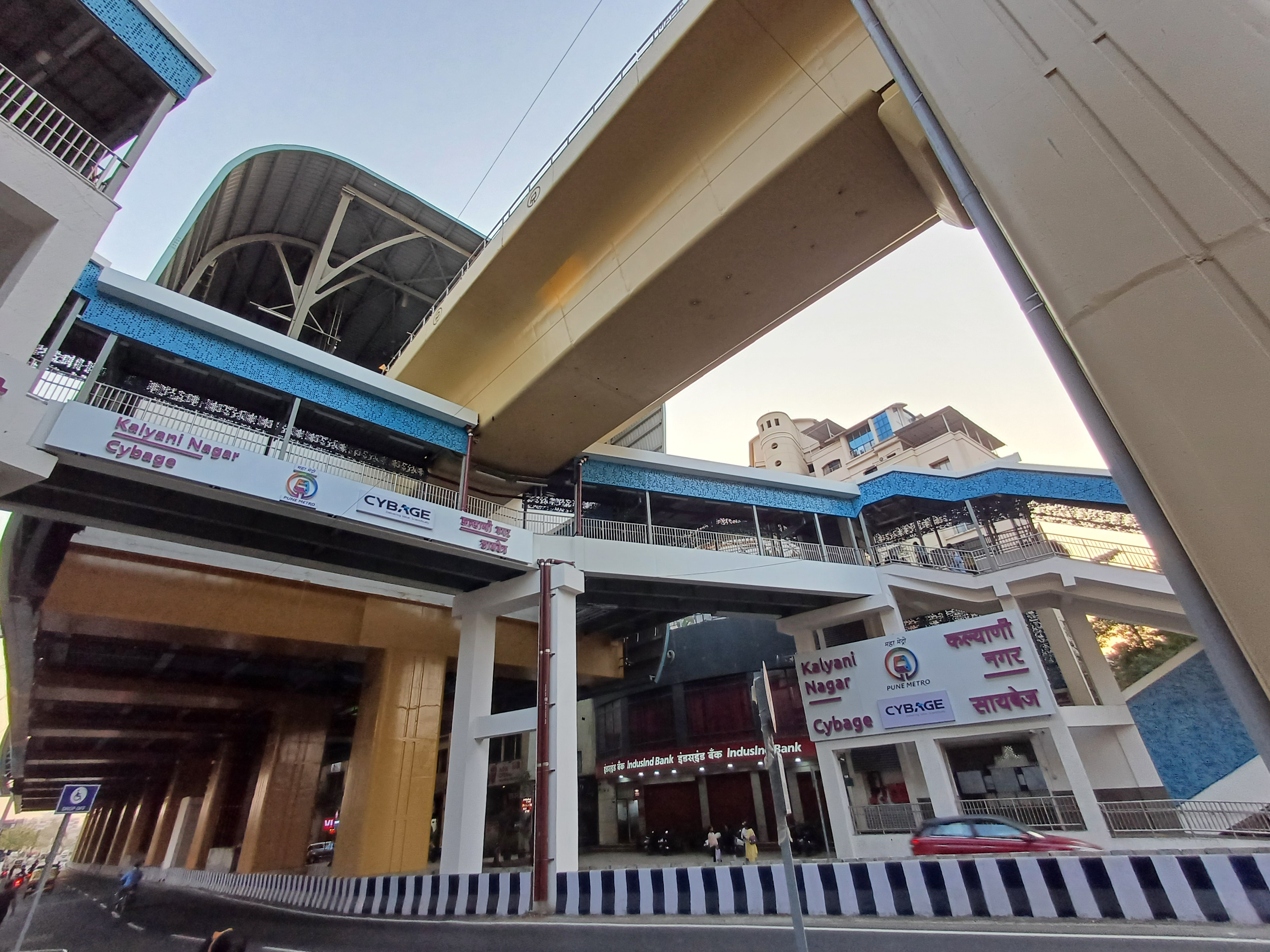
Kalyani Nagar station
(Elevated)

Stations

Here is a list of stations on this Line 2 (Aqua Line) with interchange.

Aqua Line
| # | Station name | | Opening | Connections | Layout |
| # | English | Marathi | Opening | Connections | Layout |
|---|---|---|---|---|---|
| 1 | Chandni Chowk | चांदणी चौक | Under construction | None | Elevated |
| 2 | Kothrud Bus Depot | कोथरूड बस डेपो | Under construction | PMPML | Elevated |
| 3 | Vanaz | वनाझ | 6 March 2022 | None | Elevated |
| 4 | Anand Nagar | आनंद नगर | 6 March 2022 | None | Elevated |
| 5 | Paud Phata | पौड फाटा | 6 March 2022 | None | Elevated |
| 6 | SNDT College | एसएनडीटी कॉलेज | 6 March 2022 | Line 4A | Elevated |
| 7 | Garware College | गरवारे महाविद्यालय | 6 March 2022 | None | Elevated |
| 8 | Deccan Gymkhana | डेक्कन जिमखाना | 1 August 2023 | Deccan Gymkhana PMPML Bus Station | Elevated |
| 9 | Chhatrapati Sambhaji Udyan | छत्रपती संभाजी उद्यान | 1 August 2023 | None | Elevated |
| 10 | PMC Bhavan | पुणे महानगरपालिका भवन | 1 August 2023 | None | Elevated |
| 11 | District Court Pune | जिल्हा न्यायालय पुणे | 1 August 2023 | Purple Line; Pink Line | Elevated |
| 12 | Mangalwar Peth | मंगळवार पेठ | 1 August 2023 | None | Elevated |
| 13 | Pune Railway Station | पुणे रेल्वे स्थानक | 1 August 2023 | Pune Junction | Elevated |
| 14 | Ruby Hall Clinic | रुबी हॉल क्लिनिक | 1 August 2023 | Ruby Hall Clinic PMPML Bus Station | Elevated |
| 15 | Bund Garden | बंड गार्डन | 6 March 2024 | None | Elevated |
| 16 | Yerwada | येरवडा | 21 August 2024 | Rainbow BRTS | Elevated |
| 17 | Kalyani Nagar | कल्याणी नगर | 6 March 2024 | None | Elevated |
| 18 | Ramwadi | रामवाडी | 6 March 2024 | Rainbow BRTS | Elevated |
| 19 | Viman Nagar | विमान नगर | Approved | None | Elevated |
| 20 | Somnath Nagar | सोमनाथ नगर | Approved | None | Elevated |
| 21 | Kharadi Bypass | खराडी बायपास | Approved | Line 4 | Elevated |
| 22 | Tulaja Bhavani Nagar | तुळजा भवानी नगर | Approved | None | Elevated |
| 23 | Ubale Nagar | उबाळे नगर | Approved | None | Elevated |
| 24 | Upper Kharadi Road | अप्पर खराडी रस्ता | Approved | None | Elevated |
| 25 | Wagheshwar Temple | वाघेश्वर मंदिर | Approved | None | Elevated |
| 26 | Wagholi | वाघोली | Approved | None | Elevated |
| 27 | Siddharth Nagar | सिद्धार्थ नगर | Approved | None | Elevated |
| 28 | Bakori Phata | बकोरी फाटा | Approved | None | Elevated |
| 29 | Vithalawadi | विठ्ठलवाडी | Approved | None | Elevated |

=== Pink Line (Line 3) ===
Line 3 aka Pink Metro is under construction by Pune IT City Metro Rail Limited and will run from District Court, Pune to Megapolis Pune (including Maan and Bhoirwadi) in Hinjawadi. The 23.2 km (14.42 mi) line will be completely elevated and with 23 stations and will connect with the Purple line and Aqua Line at the District Court interchange station.

Stations

Here is a list of stations on this Line 3 (Pink Line) with interchange.

Pink Line
| # | Station Name | | Opening | Connections | Station Layout |
| # | English | Marathi | Opening | Connections | Station Layout |
|---|---|---|---|---|---|
| 1 | Maan | माण | 03 November 2026 | | Elevated |
| 2 | Maan - MIDC Circle Phase-II | माण - एमआयडीसी सर्कल, फेज २ | 03 November 2026 | | Elevated |
| 3 | Maan Bus Depot | माण बस डेपो | 03 November 2026 | | Elevated |
| 4 | Hinjawadi Phase-II Circle-II | हिंजवडी फेज २ सर्कल २ | 03 November 2026 | | Elevated |
| 5 | Hinjawadi Phase-II Circle-I | हिंजवडी फेज २ सर्कल १ | 03 November 2026 | | Elevated |
| 6 | Padmabhushan Chowk | पद्मभूषण चौक | 03 November 2026 | | Elevated |
| 7 | Hinjawadi Phase-I | श्री शिवछत्रपती शिवाजी महाराज चौक हिंजवडी | 03 November 2026 | | Elevated |
| 8 | Hinjawadi Phase-I | हिंजवडी फेज १ | 03 November 2026 | | Elevated |
| 9 | Wakad Chowk | वाकड चौक | 03 November 2026 | | Elevated |
| 10 | Shree Shiv Chhatrapati Sports Complex Mahalunge | श्री शिवछत्रपती क्रीडा संकुल महाळुंगे | 03 November 2026 | | Elevated |
| 11 | Mitcon Balewadi | मिटकॉन बालेवाडी | 03 November 2026 | | Elevated |
| 12 | R K Laxman Museum Balewadi | आर.के. लक्ष्मण संग्रहालय बालेवाडी | 03 November 2026 | | Elevated |
| 13 | Balewadi High Street | बालेवाडी हायस्ट्रीट | December 2026 | | Elevated |
| 14 | Balewadi Phata | बालेवाडी फाटा | December 2026 | | Elevated |
| 15 | Baner Gaon | बाणेर गाव | January 2027 | | Elevated |
| 16 | Baner Pashan Link Road | बाणेर पाषाण जोडरस्ता | January 2027 | | Elevated |
| 17 | Aundh | औंध | 03 November 2026 | | Elevated |
| 18 | Sakal Nagar | सकाळ नगर | 03 November 2026 | | Elevated |
| 19 | Savitribai Phule Pune University | सावित्रीबाई फुले पुणे विद्यापीठ | 03 November 2026 | | Elevated |
| 20 | Bhosalenagar - RBI | भोसलेनगर - आरबीआय | Januray 2027 | | Elevated |
| 21 | Agriculture College | कृषी महाविद्यालय | 03 November 2026 | | Elevated |
| 22 | Shivaji Nagar | शिवाजी नगर | Januray 2027 | Purple Line | Elevated |
| 23 | District Court Pune | जिल्हा न्यायालय पुणे | 03 November 2026 | Purple Line; Aqua Line | Elevated |

=== Orange Line (Line 4) ===
Line 4 will run from Khadakwasla to Kharadi Bypass metro station on Ramwadi to Vithalwadi extension of Aqua line.This will have a spur line (Line 4A) which will branch from Manikbaug metro station & will connect Nal stop on Aqua line via Warje. This line will have interchange with Purple line, Swargate MSRTC stand and Swargate PMPML depot at Swargate, Hadapsar metro station/Hadapsar chowk on this line will be starting point for Hadapsar to Loni Kalbhor metro line and Hadapsar bus depot metro station on Hadapsar - Loni Kalbhor metro line will be start point Hadapsar to Saswad metro line, so commuters heading towards Loni Kalbhor/Saswad can interchange here and another important station is Hadapsar railway station metro station which will link with Hadapsar Terminal for long distance Indian railways trains. This line will connect Magarpatta cyber city a major IT centre in Pune by three stations Magarpatta South, Magarpatta Main and Magarpatta North. The main line is 25.64 km (15.93 mi) long and the spur line is 6.12 km (3.80 mi) long. There will be 22 stations on main line and 6 stations on the spur line. The proposed depot for this line is at Central Water & Power Research Station (CWPRS) in Khadakwasla. The total cost estimated is around ₹ 9,857.85 crore.

Stations

Here is a list of stations on this line with interchange. Spur line will start from Manikbaug.

Orange Line
| # | Station Name | | Expected Opening | Connections | Station Layout |
| # | English | Marathi | Expected Opening | Connections | Station Layout |
|---|---|---|---|---|---|
| 1 | Khadakwasla | खडकवासला | Approved | | Elevated |
| 2 | Dalvewadi | डालवेवाडी | Approved | | Elevated |
| 3 | Nanded City | नांदेड सिटी | Approved | | Elevated |
| 4 | Dhayari Phata | धायरी फाटा | Approved | | Elevated |
| 5 | Manik Baug | माणिक बाग | Approved | Line 4A | Elevated |
| 6 | Hingne Chowk | हिंगणे चौक | Approved | | Elevated |
| 7 | Rajaram Bridge | राजाराम पुल | Approved | | Elevated |
| 8 | P L Deshpande Udyan | पु.ल. देशपांडे उद्यान | Approved | | Elevated |
| 9 | Dandekar Bridge | दांडेकर पुल | Approved | | Elevated |
| 10 | Swargate North | स्वारगेट उत्तर | Approved | Purple Line at Swargate, Swargate MSRTC stand and Swargate PMPML depot | Elevated |
| 11 | 7 Loves Chowk | 7 लवज चौक | Approved | | Elevated |
| 12 | Pune Cantonment Board (PCB) | पुणे छावणी मंडळ (पी.सी.बी.) | Approved | | Elevated |
| 13 | Race Course | रेस कोर्स | Approved | | Elevated |
| 14 | Fatimanagar | फातिमानगर | Approved | | Elevated |
| 15 | Ramtekdi | रामटेकडी | Approved | | Elevated |
| 16 | Hadapasar/Hadapsar Chowk | हडपसर/हडपसर चौक | Approved | Line 4B at Hadapsar Phata Metro Station | Elevated |
| 17 | Magarpatta South | मगरपट्टा दक्षिण | Approved | for Magarpatta cyber city | Elevated |
| 18 | Magarpatta Main | मगरपट्टा मुख्य | Approved | for Magarpatta cyber city | Elevated |
| 19 | Magarpatta North | मगरपट्टा उत्तर | Approved | for Magarpatta cyber city | Elevated |
| 20 | Hadapsar Railway Station | हडपसर रेल्वे स्थानक | Approved | Hadapsar Terminal | Elevated |
| 21 | Sant Nagar Chowk | संत नगर चौक | Approved | | Elevated |
| 22 | Kharadi Chowk | खराडी चौक | Approved | Aqua Line at Kharadi Bypass | Elevated |
Orange Line A (Spur Line)
| 0 | Manik Baug | माणिक बाग | Approved | Line 4 | Elevated |
| 1 | Daulat Nagar | दौलत नगर | Approved | | Elevated |
| 2 | Warje | वारजे | Approved | | Elevated |
| 3 | Karve Nagar | कर्वे नगर | Approved | | Elevated |
| 4 | Dahanukar Colony | डहाणूकर काॅलनी | Approved | | Elevated |
| 5 | Karve Putala | कर्वे पुतळा | Approved | | Elevated |
| 6 | SNDT | एस.एन.डी.टी. | Approved | Aqua Line at Nal Stop | Elevated |
Orange Line B (Spur Line)
| 0 | Hadapsar Phata | हडपसर फाटा | Approved | Line 4 at Hadapsar Metro Station | Elevated |
| 1 | Hadapsar Bus Depot | हडपसर बस डेपो | Approved | Line 4C | Elevated |
| 2 | Akashwani–Hadapsar | आकाशवाणी-हडपसर | Approved | | Elevated |
| 3 | Laxmi Colony | लक्ष्मी कॉलनी | Approved | | Elevated |
| 4 | Stud Farm | स्टड फार्म | Approved | | Elevated |
| 5 | Manjari Phata | मांजरी फाटा | Approved | | Elevated |
| 6 | Draksha Baug | द्राक्ष बाग | Approved | | Elevated |
| 7 | Toll Naka | टोल नाका | Approved | | Elevated |
| 8 | Wak Vasti | वाक वस्ती | Approved | | Elevated |
| 9 | Loni Kalbhor | लोणी काळभोर | Approved | | Elevated |
Orange Line C (Spur Line)
| 0 | Hadapsar Bus Depot (Gadital) | हडपसर बस डेपो (गाडीतळ) | Approved | Line 4B | Elevated |
| 1 | Hadapsar Gliding Club | हडपसर ग्लायडिंग क्लब | Approved | | Elevated |
| 2 | Phursungi IT Park | फुरसुंगी आयटी पार्क | Approved | | Elevated |
| 3 | Sulabh Garden | सुलभ गार्डन | Approved | | Elevated |
| 4 | Sasvad Road Railway Station | सासवड रोड रेल्वे स्थानक | Approved | Sasvad Road | Elevated |

=== Line 5 ===
Line 5 will run through Bhakti Shakti-Wakad-Nashik Phata-Chakan. The elevated line covers a distance of 45.29 km (28.14 mi) and has 31 stations. This line will have interchange with the Purple line at Bhakti Shakti, Nashik Phata and Sant Tukaram Nagar, and interchange with the Pink Line at Wakad Chowk.

Stations

Here is a list of stations on this line with interchange.

Line 5
| # | Station Name | | Expected Opening | Connections | Station Layout |
| # | English | Marathi | Expected Opening | Connections | Station Layout |
|---|---|---|---|---|---|
| 1 | Bhakti Shakti | भक्ती शक्ती | DPR submitted | Purple Line at Bhakti Shakti Rainbow BRTS | Elevated |
| 2 | Transport Nagar | ट्रान्सपोर्ट नगर | DPR submitted | | Elevated |
| 3 | Ganesh Nagar | गणेश नगर | DPR submitted | | Elevated |
| 4 | Mukai Chowk | मुकाई चौक | DPR submitted | | Elevated |
| 5 | Ravet | रावेत | DPR submitted | | Elevated |
| 6 | Punawale Gaon | पुनावळे गाव | DPR submitted | | Elevated |
| 7 | Punawale | पुनावळे | DPR submitted | | Elevated |
| 8 | Tathawade Gaon | ताथवडे गाव | DPR submitted | | Elevated |
| 9 | Tathawade | ताथवडे | DPR submitted | | Elevated |
| 10 | Bhumar Chowk | भुमर चौक | DPR submitted | | Elevated |
| 11 | Bhujbal Chowk | भुजबळ चौक | DPR submitted | | Elevated |
| 12 | Wakad | वाकड | DPR submitted | Pink Line at Wakad Chowk | Elevated |
| 13 | Kokane Chowk | कोकणे चौक | DPR submitted | | Elevated |
| 14 | Vishal Nagar Corner | विशाल नगर कॉर्नर | DPR submitted | | Elevated |
| 15 | Pimple Saudagar | पिंपळे सौदागर | DPR submitted | | Elevated |
| 16 | Pimple Gurav | पिंपळे गुरव | DPR submitted | | Elevated |
| 17 | Nashik Phata | नाशिक फाटा | DPR submitted | Purple Line at Nashik Phata Rainbow BRTS | Elevated |
| 18 | Sant Tukaram Nagar | संत तुकाराम नगर | DPR submitted | Purple Line at Sant Tukaram Nagar | Elevated |
| 19 | Vallabh Nagar | वल्लभ नगर | DPR submitted | | Elevated |
| 20 | Gavli Matha Chowk | गवळी माथा चौक | DPR submitted | | Elevated |
| 21 | Bhosairi MIDC | भोसरी एमआयडीसी | DPR submitted | | Elevated |
| 22 | Bhosairi District Centre | भोसरी जिल्हा केंद्र | DPR submitted | | Elevated |
| 23 | Godown Chowk | गोडाऊन चौक | DPR submitted | | Elevated |
| 24 | PIEC | पीआयईसी | DPR submitted | | Elevated |
| 25 | Bharatmata Chowk (Moshi) | भारतमाता चौक (मोशी) | DPR submitted | | Elevated |
| 26 | Chimbali Phata | चिंबळी फाटा | DPR submitted | | Elevated |
| 27 | Bargevasti | बर्गेवस्ती | DPR submitted | | Elevated |
| 28 | Kuruli | कुरुळी | DPR submitted | | Elevated |
| 29 | Alandi Phata | आळंदी फाटा | DPR submitted | | Elevated |
| 30 | Nanekarwadi | नानेकरवाडी | DPR submitted | | Elevated |
| 31 | Chakan | चाकण | DPR submitted | | Elevated |

== Network ==
Pune Metro
| No. | Line Name | Terminals | | Frequency (Peak/Non-Peak) | Stations | Length | First Operational | Last Extension |
|---|---|---|---|---|---|---|---|---|
| 1 | Purple Line | PCMC Bhavan | Swargate | 6/10 minutes | 13 | 17.4 km (10.8 mi) | 6 March 2022 | 29 September 2024 |
| 2 | Aqua Line | Vanaz | Ramwadi | 6/10 minutes | 16 | 15.7 km (9.8 mi) | 6 March 2022 | 6 March 2024 |
| 3 | Pink Line | Maan | District Court | 6/12 minutes | 17 | 23.2 km (14.4 mi) | 3 November 2026 | |
| Total | | | | | 44 | 56.3 km (35.0 mi) | | |

== Infrastructure ==
=== Rolling Stock ===
The purple and aqua lines of the Pune Metro use standard gauge rolling stock manufactured by Titagarh Firema. The trains consist of 3 coaches each, have a total capacity of 970 passengers and can reach a maximum speed of 95 km/h (59 mph). The aluminium-bodied coaches are 21.34–21.64 m (70 ft 0 in – 71 ft 0 in) long, 2.90 m (9 ft 6 in) wide, and 3.90 m (12 ft 10 in) high. Each coach has a capacity of 320 passengers with longitudinal seating for 44 passengers. The trains are fully air-conditioned and feature CCTV, panic buttons, emergency doors, public address systems and audio-visual systems for indicating opening and closing of doors. One coach in each train is reserved for women and there are dedicated spaces for passengers in wheelchairs.

| Coach type | Length | Width | Height | Axle load | Seating arrangement | Passenger capacity | | |
| Coach type | Length | Width | Height | Axle load | Seating arrangement | Seating | Standing | Total |
|---|---|---|---|---|---|---|---|---|
| Driver Trailer coach (DTC) | 21.64 m (71 ft 0 in) | 2.90 m (9 ft 6 in) | 3.90 m (12 ft 10 in) | 16 tonnes | Longitudinal | 43 | 207 | 250 |
| Motor coach (MC)/Trailer coach (TC) | 21.34 m (70 ft 0 in) | 2.90 m (9 ft 6 in) | 3.90 m (12 ft 10 in) | 16 tonnes | Longitudinal | 50 | 220 | 270 |

== Financing ==
=== Funding ===
The MahaMetro lines were estimated to cost ₹11,522 crore (US$1.2 billion), a hike of ₹653 crore (US$70 million) from the 2014 estimate. The PMC and PCMC will each bear 5% of the cost, while the state government and the central government will each bear 20% of the cost. The remaining 50% will be obtained as loans. The state government's share of 20% includes the expenses of acquiring land, including government land, at market price. The delay in the execution of the project has resulted in an upward revision of ₹ 700 crores (US$107.8 million) in the draft civic budget for 2015-16 presented by Municipal Commissioner Kunal Kumar.

On 17 September 2016, the central government had approved a proposal seeking loan of ₹6,325 crore (US$680 million) from the World Bank and China-based Asian Infrastructure Investment Bank (AIIB) for the project. However, as of March 2018, MahaMetro was negotiating loans worth ₹4,500 crore (US$480 million) and ₹2,000 crore (US$210 million) from the European Investment Bank (EIB) and the French Development Agency (Agence française de développement, AFD). On 28 January 2019, the Department of Economic Affairs on behalf of the Centre and the AFD signed a facility framework agreement to extend bilateral funding of ₹2,000 crore (US$210 million).

The line 3 is estimated to cost ₹8,313 crore (US$890 million) and will be implemented by PMRDA on a PPP basis. The private partner will bring in 60% of the funds, 30% in equity and 70% in debt, while the rest 40% will be provided together by the Centre, State and PMRDA. The Centre has already approved a sum of ₹1,300 crore (US$140 million) as viability gap funding, while the State will provide ₹812 crore (US$87 million) and PMRDA will come up with the rest. The private partner will build, operate and maintain the line for 35 years. On 31 July 2018, the State government allotted 5.1 hectares (13 acres) of land with a market value of ₹153 crore (US$16 million) for Line 3. This land located in Balewadi will be monetized by the bidder for financial viability and forms a part of the costs to be borne by the State.

=== Revenue ===
The following table shows annual ridership and farebox revenue Pune Metro since inception.

Yearly ridership
| Year | Ridership |
|---|---|
| 2023 | 9,302,891 |
| 2024 | 45,721,000 |
| 2025 | 67,100,000 |

| Year | Passengers | Fare Box Revenue(₹) |
|---|---|---|
| 2023 | 9,302,891 | 13.96 crore |
| 2024 | 45,721,000 | 76.58 crore |
| 2025 | 67,100,000 | 107.6 crore |

=== Fares ===
An integrated fare system has also been planned to facilitate seamless transfers, however, exact fares for the same travel distance will vary based on the operator. MiCard (Marathi: मी कार्ड), the smart card currently being used on the bus and BRTS services run by the PMPML, will be used as the common mobility card on the metro services as well as parking facilities.

Fares in rupees for Line 1 (Purple Line)
| Station Code / Station Name | PIM | STG | BHO | KWA | PGD | DDI | BPI | SJO | CVC | BPD | MNA | SGT |
|---|---|---|---|---|---|---|---|---|---|---|---|---|
| PCMC Bhavan | - | 15 | 15 | 20 | 20 | 25 | 25 | 30 | 30 | 30 | 30 | 30 |
| Sant Tukaram Nagar | 15 | - | 10 | 15 | 15 | 15 | 20 | 25 | 25 | 30 | 30 | 30 |
| Nashik Phata | 15 | 10 | - | 10 | 15 | 15 | 20 | 25 | 25 | 25 | 30 | 30 |
| Kasarwadi | 20 | 15 | 10 | - | 10 | 10 | 15 | 25 | 25 | 25 | 25 | 30 |
| Phugewadi | 20 | 15 | 15 | 10 | - | 10 | 15 | 25 | 25 | 25 | 25 | 30 |
| Dapodi | 25 | 15 | 15 | 10 | 10 | - | 10 | 25 | 25 | 25 | 25 | 30 |
| Bopodi | 25 | 20 | 20 | 15 | 15 | 10 | - | 20 | 20 | 25 | 25 | 25 |
| Shivaji Nagar | 30 | 25 | 25 | 25 | 25 | 25 | 20 | - | 10 | 15 | 15 | 20 |
| District Court | 30 | 25 | 25 | 25 | 25 | 25 | 20 | 10 | - | 10 | 15 | 15 |
| Kasba Peth | 30 | 30 | 25 | 25 | 25 | 25 | 25 | 15 | 10 | - | 10 | 15 |
| Mahatma Phule Mandai | 30 | 30 | 30 | 25 | 25 | 25 | 25 | 15 | 15 | 10 | - | 10 |
| Swargate | 30 | 30 | 30 | 30 | 25 | 25 | 25 | 20 | 15 | 15 | 10 | - |

== Issues ==
=== Delay in Implementation ===
The citizens and city based NGOs have regularly raised questions over the intention of the state governments as to whether they actually want to implement the project. The project was proposed way back in 2007 by the Chief Ministers of Maharashtra, but did not move ahead due to many reasons. The DPR was itself approved only on 12 June 2012. At an event in 2013 during his tour of the city, the Metroman E. Sreedharan blamed the people involved in planning and implementing the project for the long delay, stating that "Pune lost five valuable years in unnecessary discussions instead of executing the project."

=== Alignment Issue ===
Initial plans were to build a few sections underground and the rest elevated. However, citizens of Pune did not want elevated routes as they felt that the roads could not bear the increased traffic that would result from the construction. Most roads were too narrow to accommodate the pillars of elevated routes. It was decided that all the routes in the city would be underground, although the map and the details of phases showed elevated routes. In November 2011, the state government declared that all the routes would be underground. However, in April 2012, the PMC declared that all routes will be as per the DMRC report, mostly elevated and partially underground in core city areas. On 27 May 2015, the then Minister of Housing and Urban Affairs stated that underground metro was not a feasible option and that Pune, like other cities, will have to get an elevated metro as suggested by the DMRC. But as per the city activists, elevated metro is not possible due to presence of some flyovers along the route of metro and narrow roads on the metro corridor, which will cause traffic congestion and interruption. To alleviate the confusion, Chief Ministers of Maharashtra announced that Pune will get "mixed-metro", as the alignment of some routes does support elevated sections.

Metro phase I was criticized by Pimpri Chinchwad Citizens Forum, Pune (PCCF), believing that the project will not benefit nearly 70 per cent area of PCMC Administration, as it will not serve the Akurdi, Chinchwad and Nigdi stretch. Adding further, the citizens group supported their cause by stating that it would take another 5 years after phase II gets approval from Union Cabinet for metro to reach core PCMC administered areas. Since infrastructure projects take a lot of time to get approvals, they fear the metro will not reach Nigdi before 2025.

=== Environment Interest Litigation ===
In May 2016, an environment interest litigation (EIL) was filed in the western zone bench of the National Green Tribunal (NGT) against the realignment of Line 2 from Jangali Maharaj Road to the Mutha River bed. The litigants MP Anu Aga, Sarang Yadwadkar, Arti Kirloskar and Dileep Padgaonkar expressed concerns over free flow of the river being obstructed by the pillars supporting the 1.7-km stretch of the metro viaduct. In October 2016, the Biodiversity Monitoring Committee of the PMC reported that the metro project could be catastrophic for the riverbed ecology, corroborating the EIL. The NGT put an interim stay on metro construction in the river bed on 2 January 2017, days after the foundation stone was laid on 24 December 2016. The stay, however, was put on hold by the Supreme Court. Subsequently, after the MahaMetro was formed and became a respondent in the EIL, it unsuccessfully moved the Supreme Court challenging the NGT's jurisdiction on the case. In October 2017, the NGT resumed the hearing and appointed an expert committee convened by the National Environmental Engineering Research Institute (NEERI) to study the impact of the metro project on the river bed. In January 2018, the report was submitted and stated that the construction would not damage the river. However, the case is still pending in the NGT. Since 1 February 2018, the NGT's western zone bench in Pune is unable to function following a Supreme Court order restricting single-member benches of the NGT from hearing cases. The case is expected to be heard in July 2018, when the circuit bench of the NGT will hear cases for three weeks in Pune. On 3 August 2018, the principal bench of the NGT cleared metro construction on the river bed. The clearance is subject to MahaMetro complying with the recommendations made by the three-member expert committee, which had concluded that the construction would not damage riverbed hydrology.

=== FSI Debate ===
The DMRC had proposed 4 FSI on either side of the corridor to achieve greater population densification through vertical development of residential and commercial properties. The PMC will raise money for the metro and needed civic amenities to support the higher density. Furthermore, PMC hopes to increase the use of metro.

Some members of the planning committee have suggested that three FSI be granted not only within a 500-m radius along the metro corridor but also in the entire city. Members have suggested that the amount collected through the premium on additional FSI should be turned into an urban development fund. A 60% share of this fund should be used for the metro project, while 15% for the PMPML and high capacity mass transit road and monorail and 25% for developing basic infrastructure.

But as per several urban planners, NGOs and experts, the FSI introduction will have more drawbacks than benefits for the city.

1. Even if half of the landowners along the metro corridor take advantage of the 4 FSI proposal, it will lead to 20 km^{2} of built up area in coming years, which is more than the total housing needs of Pune for the next 20 years.
2. The PMC would raise ₹37,000 crore (US$4.0 billion) from the sale of FSI whereas it needs just ₹3,000 crore (US$320 million).
3. In the area studied, most of the plots which could consume the 4 FSI were at the edge of the corridor away from the stations, while many plots next to the tracks and the stations would remain as they are, since they are too small to accommodate the extra FSI. This plan might backfire as the distance of these plots from the nearby metro corridor might encourage the residents to use private vehicles and thus, defeat the purpose of metro.
4. Given the prevailing land costs, the new development that comes up will be of the "premium" category. Thus any new housing that comes up through this extra FSI will cater to the more affluent segment, which is the group least likely to use the Metro.
5. The open space per capita in the city will be reduced to half or less of what it is at present. The space required for other public amenities like hospitals, schools, clinics etc. will also fall short since very few plots are large enough to come under the "amenity" space rules under which the landowners have to give small portion to the city for providing amenities.

In July 2018, the Department of Defence of the MoD notified height restrictions in a six-kilometer radius of the National Defence Academy and the Lohegaon airport. This area accounts for approximately 50% of the city's area. The notification restricts the construction of high-rise buildings and has made 4 FSI along the metro corridor under the transit-oriented development policy impossible.

== In popular culture ==
In 2021, the first-ever movie to be shot in Pune metro was the Shah Rukh Khan and Nayanthara starrer film Jawan. The film was shot in Sant Tukaram Nagar metro station.

== See also ==
- Urban rail transit in India
  - Maharashtra Metro Rail Corporation Limited
    - Nagpur Metro
- Transport in Pune
- Pune Suburban Railway
- Pune Mahanagar Parivahan Mahamandal Limited
