= Nashik Phata metro station =

Pune Metro's Purple Line metro station in Pimpri-Chinchwad, India

Nashik Phata
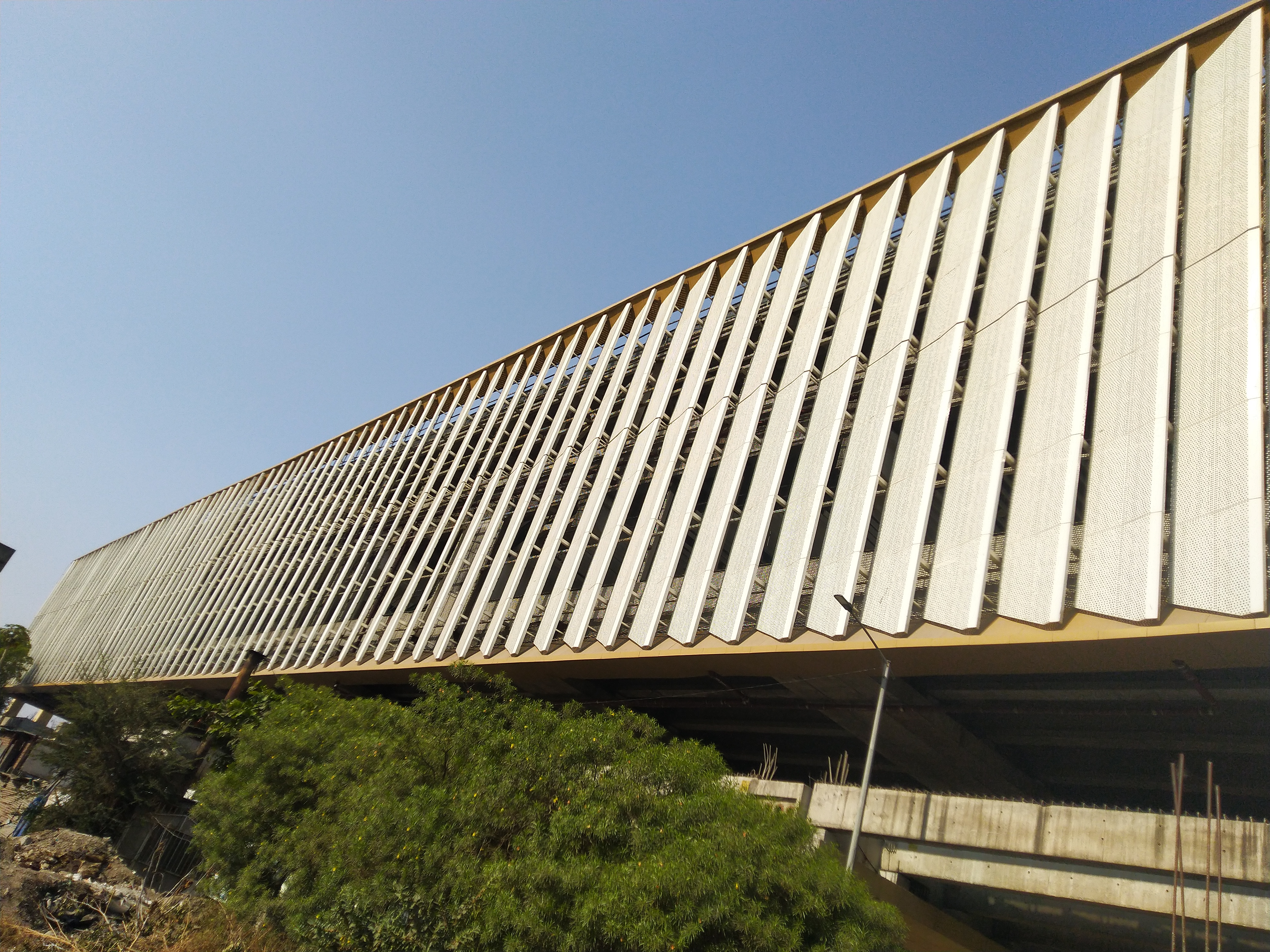

General information
- Location: Kasarwadi, Pimpri Chinchwad, Maharashtra 411026
- Coordinates: 18.6094°N 73.8201°E
- System: Pune Metro station
- Owner: Maharashtra Metro Rail Corporation Limited (Maha Metro)
- Operator: Pune Metro
- Line: Purple Line
- Platforms: Side platform Platform-1 → Swargate; Platform-2 → PCMC Bhavan
- Tracks: 2

Construction
- Structure type: Elevated, Double track
- Platform levels: 2
- Accessible: Yes

Other information
- Station code: BHO

History
- Opened: 6 March 2022; 4 years ago
- Electrified: 25 kV 50 Hz AC overhead catenary
- Former names: Bhosari

Services
Preceding station	Pune Metro	Following station
Sant Tukaram Nagar towards PCMC Bhavan	Purple Line	Kasarwadi towards Swargate
Route map
Location

Nashik Phata is an elevated metro station on the North-South corridor of the Purple Line of Pune Metro in Pimpri Chinchwad, India. The station was opened on 6 March 2022 as an inauguration of Pune Metro. From March 2022 to July 2023, the Purple Line operated between PCMC Bhavan and Phugewadi, but from 1 August 2023 the section between Phugewadi and District Court Pune metro station came into use, so trains ran from PCMC Bhavan to Civil Court. On 29 September 2024, the launch of Pune Metro Phase I was completed and the Purple Line was fully operational from PCMC to Swargate.

== Station layout ==
G	Street level	Exit/Entrance
L1	Mezzanine	Fare control, station agent, Metro Card vending machines, crossover
L2	Side platform | Doors will open on the left
L2	Platform 1 Southbound	Towards → Swargate; Next Station: Kasarwadi
L2	Platform 2 Northbound	Towards ← PCMC Bhavan; Next Station: Sant Tukaram Nagar
L2	Side platform | Doors will open on the left
L2

== See also ==
- Pune
- Maharashtra
- Rapid Transit in India
