= Tukaram (disambiguation) =

Tukaram was a 17th century Varkari saint from Maharashtra, India.

Tukaram may also refer to:

== Films ==
About the saint

- Tukaram (film), a 2012 Indian Marathi-language film
- Sant Tukaram (1936 film), an Indian Marathi-language film
- Sant Tukaram (2025 film), an upcoming Indian Hindi-language biography
- Bhakta Tukaram, a 1973 Indian Telugu-language film
- Thukkaram, a 1938 Indian Tamil-language film
- Santha Thukaram, a 1963 Indian Kannada-language film

Others

- Tukaram Patil, a fictional policeman in the 2008 Indian film Mumbai Meri Jaan

== People ==
Tukaram is an Indian male given name.

=== Police ===
- Tukaram Omble, Indian police officer

=== Politicians ===
- Tukaram Shrangare
- Tukaram Ramkrishna Kate
- Tukaram Renge Patil
- Tukaram Huraji Gavit
- Tukaram Gangadhar Gadakh

== Places ==
- Sant Tukaram Nagar, a town in Maharashtra, India, near Puneune
  - Sant Tukaram Nagar metro station, Pune Metro
