= Kasarwadi =

Locality in Pune, India

- Locality
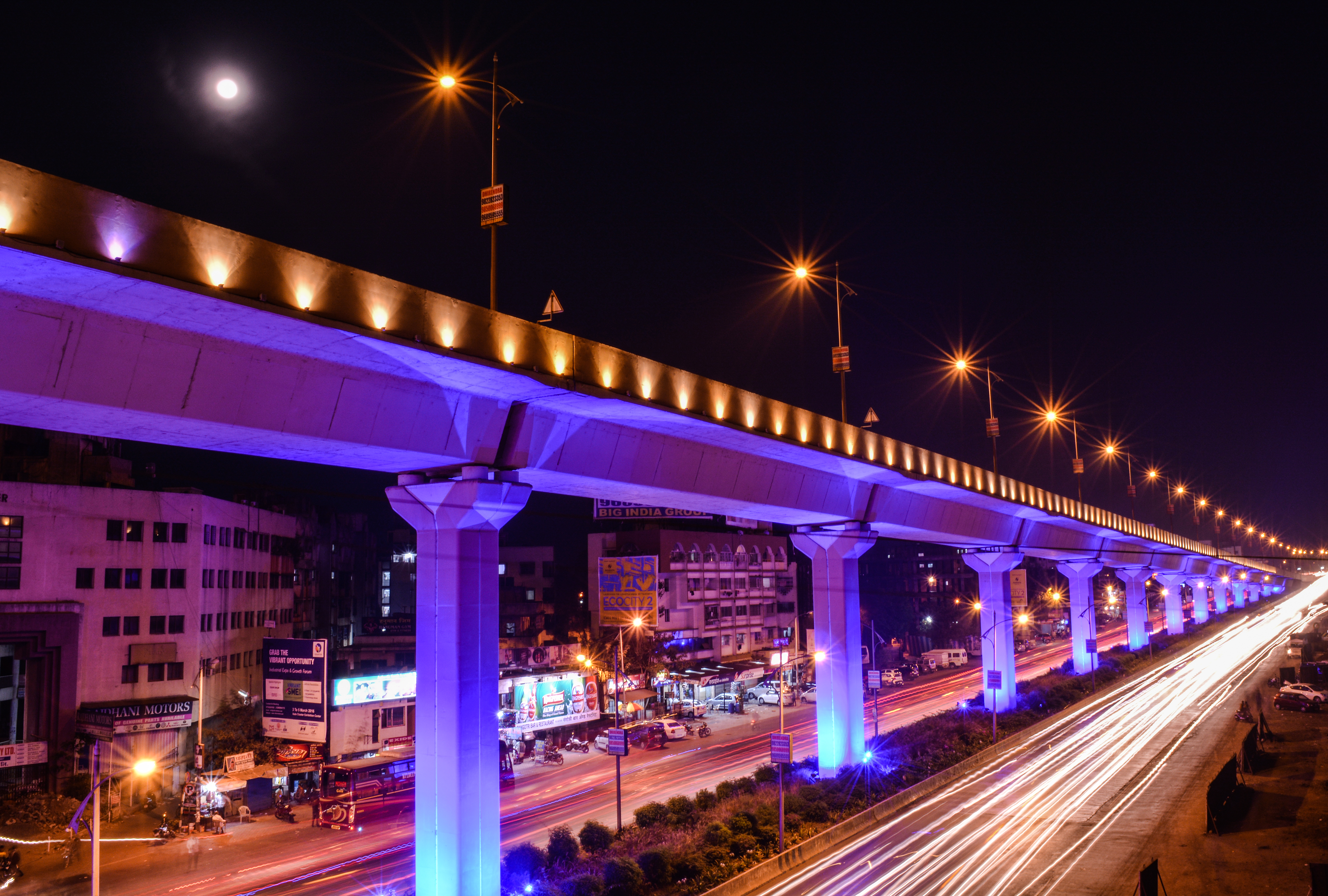
- JRD TATA Bridge (Nashik Phata)

- Location within Maharashtra
- Coordinates: 18°37′07.04″N 73°48′13.43″E
- Country: India
- State: Maharashtra
- District: Pune
- City: Pimpri Chinchwad

Languages
  - Official: Marathi
- Time zone: UTC+5:30 (IST)
- Telephone code: 91-20
- Vehicle registration: MH-14
- Website: www.pcmcindia.gov.in

Kasarwadi is a locality in Pimpri Chinchwad

== Transport ==
=== Rail ===
Kasarwadi Railway Station is the only railway station in the locality. The station is on the junction of Old Mumbai–Pune Highway and Pune–Nashik Highway. Station has two platforms and a foot overbridge.

=== Metro ===
Kasarwadi metro station is an elevated metro station on the north–south corridor of the Purple Line of Pune Metro in Pimpri Chinchwad, India. The station was opened on 6 March 2022 as an inauguration of Pune Metro. From March 2022 to July 2023, the Purple Line operated between PCMC Bhavan and Phugewadi, but from 1 August 2023 the section between Phugewadi and District Court Pune metro station came into use, so trains run from PCMC Bhavan to Civil Court.
