= Google Station =

Google service

- Area served: India, Indonesia, Mexico, Thailand, Nigeria, Philippines, Brazil, Vietnam, South Africa
- Owner: Google
- Website: Google Station
- Launched: January 2016; 10 years ago

Google Station was a Google service that allowed partners to roll out Wi-Fi hotspots in public places by providing software and advice on hardware to turn fiber connections into Wi-Fi. It was only implemented in India and Indonesia but in March 2018, the service was launched in Mexico. In February 2020, Google announced the service would be discontinued. The service went offline on September 30, 2020.

RailTel took over the service in India and continues to offer free Wi-Fi at railway stations.

== Overview ==
Google Station seeks to provide "fast Wi-Fi for everyone". It also highlights that data will be "safe and protected" on Google's network. As it envisions expanding the offering, potential partners include "large venues and organizations, network operators, fiber providers, system integrators, and infrastructure companies". Google Station's advantages include being a simple, easy-to-use solution (both for users and partners) that also offers monetization opportunities through advertising (Google Station calls itself "an advertising platform, backed by a world-class advertising sales team and network").

== History ==
=== India ===
The program was first announced in September 2015, when Indian Prime Minister Narendra Modi visited Google's headquarters in Mountain View, California. Google CEO Sundar Pichai further detailed the plan in a blog post on the Official Google Blog, noting that it would be the "largest public Wi-Fi project in India, and among the largest in the world, by number of potential users".

In January 2016, Google launched the program at the Mumbai Central railway station in India in partnership with Indian Railways and RailTel. RailTel, a state-owned enterprise, provides Internet services as RailWire via its extensive fiber network alongside many of these railway lines. In September 2016, the project was christened "Google Station". In December 2016, Google announced that it had rolled out Google Station at the 100th railway station in India.

In January 2018, NDTV reported that Google had started testing a paid model of Google Station, which is slated to reach as many as 400 railway stations in 2018. Later that month, Google announced that for the first time the Google Station projected had expanded beyond railway stations by launching 150 hotspots in Pune. It worked with Larsen & Toubro, India's largest engineering and construction company, and the project is a part of Smart City Pune, a part of India's Smart Cities Mission. In June 2018, Google announced that it had deployed WiFi at 400 railway stations across India with Dibrugarh railway station being the 400th station. The company also stated that the service was being used by around 8 million users per month and the average data session on Google Station consumed 350 MB of data.

=== Launch outside India ===
Google announced that it was bringing Google Station to Indonesia in partnership with FiberStar and CBN, two Indonesian telecommunications companies that plan on rolling out Wi-Fi hotspots at hundreds of venues across the islands of Java and Bali in 2018. In March 2018 it announced expansion into Mexico, in partnership with the existing SitWifi network. In July 2018, at the "Google for Nigeria" event, Google station was launched in Lagos with the promise of expanding to 200 locations in 5 cities in the country by 2019. In February 2019, Google Station was launched in the Philippines, in partnership with Smart. In June 2019, Google Station was made available in the city of São Paulo, Brazil, with expansion to other Brazilian cities planned. The program in Brazil involves America Net and Linktel as partners, and Itaú as a sponsor. In November 2019, Google Station was launched in 125 locations around Cape Town, South Africa in partnership with Think Wi-Fi.

=== Closure ===
In February 2020, Google announced the service would be discontinued, saying that it was "no longer necessary," and "it had become difficult for Google to find a sustainable business model to scale the program." The service went offline on September 30, 2020. In India, RailTel took over the service and continues to offer free Wi-Fi without Google branding.

== See also ==
- Internet in India
- Internet in Indonesia
- List of Google products
- Tez (software)
