= Deccan Gymkhana metro station =

Pune Metro's Aqua Line metro station

Deccan Gymkhana
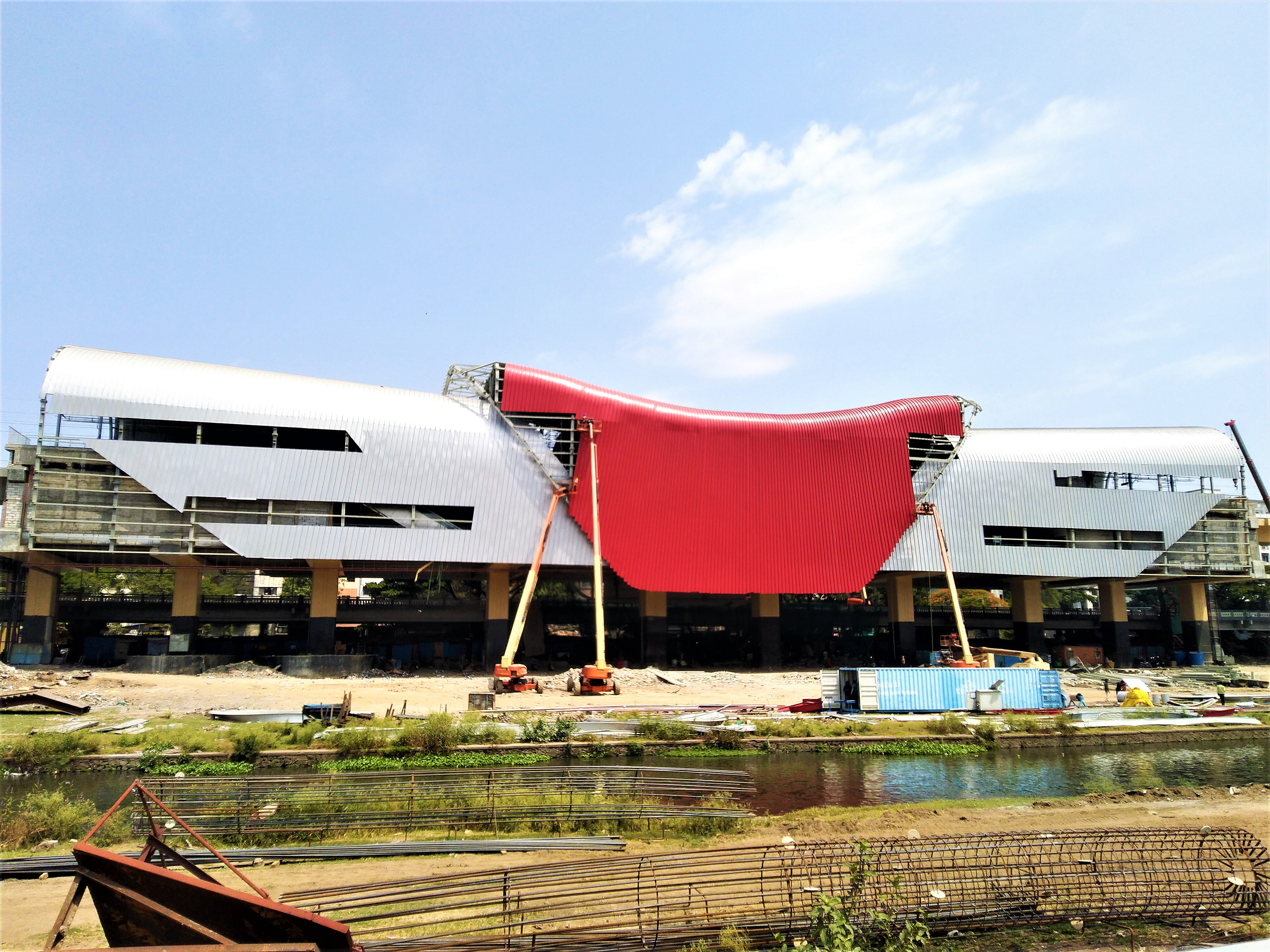

General information
- Location: Pulachi Wadi, Deccan Gymkhana, Pune, Maharashtra 411004
- Coordinates: 18°30′59″N 73°50′40″E
- System: Pune Metro station
- Owner: Maharashtra Metro Rail Corporation Limited (MAHA-METRO)
- Operator: Pune Metro
- Line: Aqua Line
- Platforms: Side platform Platform-1 → Ramwadi; Platform-2 → Vanaz
- Tracks: 2

Construction
- Structure type: Elevated, Double track
- Platform levels: 2
- Accessible: Yes

Other information
- Station code: DGK

History
- Opened: 1 August 2023; 3 years ago
- Electrified: 25 kV 50 Hz AC overhead catenary

Services
Preceding station	Pune Metro	Following station
Garware College towards Vanaz	Aqua Line	Chhatrapati Sambhaji Udyan towards Ramwadi
Route map
Location

Deccan Gymkhana is an elevated metro station on the east–west corridor of the Aqua Line of Pune Metro in Pune, India. The station was opened on 1 August 2023 as an extension of Pune Metro Phase I. Aqua Line operates between Vanaz and Ramwadi.

Located on the banks of Mutha River, the station is 26m high, 28m wide and 140m long. Its design is inspired by the Mavala Pagadi (turban) of Shivaji Maharaj. A skywalk from Deccan Gymkhana PMPML bus stop on J. M. Road has been built to reach the station. In the future, the station will be connected with another skywalk from Good Luck Chowk on F. C. Road.

== Station layout ==
G	Street level	Exit/Entrance
L1	Mezzanine	Fare control, station agent, Metro Card vending machines, crossover
L2	Side platform | Doors will open on the left
L2	Platform 1 Eastbound	Towards → Ramwadi; Next Station: Chhatrapati Sambhaji Udyan
L2	Platform 2 Westbound	Towards ← Vanaz; Next Station: Garware College
L2	Side platform | Doors will open on the left
L3

== See also ==
- Pune
- Maharashtra
- Rapid Transit in India
