= Sant Tukaram Nagar metro station =

Pune Metro's Purple Line metro station in Pimpri-Chinchwad, India

Sant Tukaram Nagar
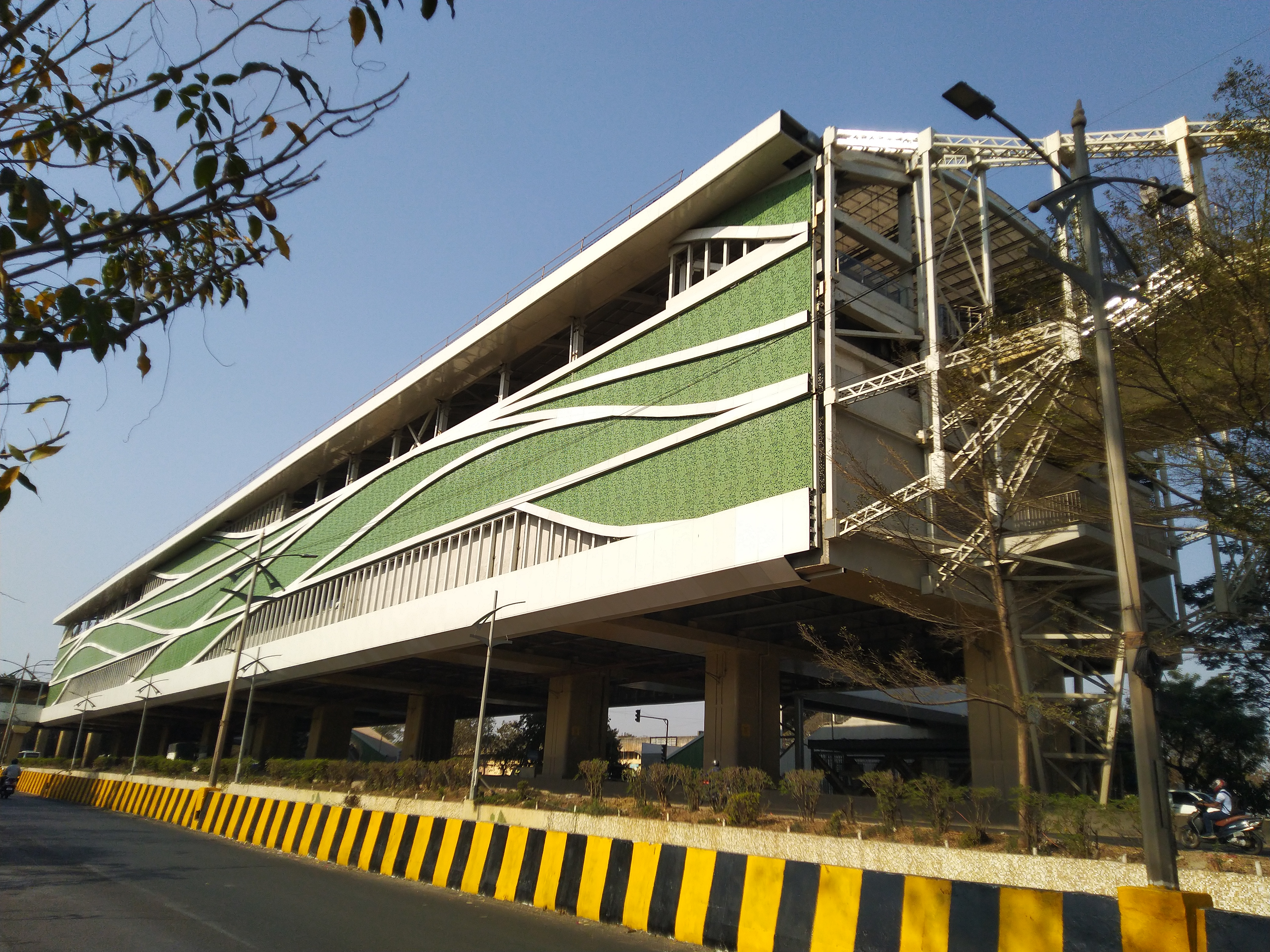

General information
- Location: Old Mumbai - Pune Hwy, Sukhwani Complex, Vallabh Nagar, Pimpri Colony, Pimpri Chinchwad, Maharashtra 411018
- Coordinates: 18.6146°N 73.8158°E
- System: Pune Metro station
- Owner: Maharashtra Metro Rail Corporation Limited (Maha Metro)
- Operator: Pune Metro
- Line: Purple Line
- Platforms: Side platform Platform-1 → Swargate; Platform-2 → PCMC Bhavan
- Tracks: 2

Construction
- Structure type: Elevated, Double track
- Platform levels: 2
- Accessible: Yes

Other information
- Station code: STG

History
- Opened: 6 March 2022; 4 years ago
- Electrified: 25 kV 50 Hz AC overhead catenary

Services
Preceding station	Pune Metro	Following station
PCMC Bhavan Terminus	Purple Line	Nashik Phata towards Swargate
Route map
Location

Sant Tukaram Nagar is an elevated metro station on the north–south corridor of the Purple Line of Pune Metro in Pimpri Chinchwad, India. The station was opened on 6 March 2022 and was the first to be completed. From March 2022 to July 2023, the Purple Line operated between PCMC Bhavan and Phugewadi, but from 1 August 2023 the section between Phugewadi and District Court Pune metro station came into use, so trains ran from PCMC Bhavan to Civil Court. On 29 September 2024, the launch of Pune Metro Phase I was completed and the Purple Line was fully operational from PCMC to Swargate.

== Station layout ==
G	Street level	Exit/Entrance
L1	Mezzanine	Fare control, station agent, Metro Card vending machines, crossover
L2	Side platform | Doors will open on the left
L2	Platform 1 Southbound	Towards → Swargate; Next Station: Nashik Phata
L2	Platform 2 Northbound	Towards ← PCMC Bhavan
L2	Side platform | Doors will open on the left
L2

== In popular culture ==
In 2021, Shahrukh Khan filmed his movie Jawan (2023) at the Sant Tukaram metro station and in the "maha metro train". The filming happened in August–September 2021. The station also appeared in the movie's posters.

== See also ==
- Pune
- Maharashtra
- Rapid Transit in India
