= Smart City Pune =

Pune Municipal Corporation (PMC) is on a list of 100 smart cities declared by the Government of India for development under the Smart Cities Mission. Pune's quest for better urban living got a boost as it was listed among 100 cities selected by the Union Government of India. As a pre-condition, Pune will need to prepare a city-level plan of its own, which will be evaluated in the second stage of the competition based on a broad set of criteria. At the end, the Union government will select 20 cities that will receive funds for this financial year.

PMC has organized a contest for citizens on "How to make Pune a smart city" towards Citizen's participation.

== Initiatives ==
The Digital Pune Hackathon 2015 was inaugurated in the presence of Pune Municipal Commissioner Kunal Kumar. The hackathon has been organised to seek digital solutions to several problems faced by the city in the quest to become a Smart City. Top projects will be selected for implementation in the city by various bodies like PMC, PCMC, PMRDA and PMPML.

In January 2018, Google announced that it was rolling out Google Station, a Wi-Fi hotspot solution, in Pune as a part of the Smart City Pune initiative, working with Larsen & Toubro.However RailTel took over after Google Station shut down.
