= RailTel =

Indian network services company

RailTel Corporation of India Limited (RCIL)
- Type: Public
- Traded as: BSE: 543265; NSE: RAILTEL
- ISIN: INE0DD101019
- Industry: Telecommunications
- Founded: September 2000; 26 years ago
- Headquarters: Plate A, 6th Floor, Office block 2, East Kidwai Nagar, New Delhi, India
- Area served: India
- Key people: Mr. Sanjai Kumar, Chairman and Managing Director
- Services: Broadband; Internet service; Technology
- Revenue: ▲₹1,628 crore (US$170 million) (FY 2021-2022)
- Net income: ▲₹209 crore (US$22 million) (FY 2021-2022)
- Total equity: ▲₹1,516 crore (US$160 million) (FY 2021-2022)
- Owner: Union of India (72.84%)
- Number of employees: 730 (2022)
- Subsidiaries: RailTel Enterprises Limited
- Website: www.railtel.in

RailTel Corporation of India Limited (RCIL) is an Indian Navaratna Public Sector Undertaking (PSU) which provides broadband and VPN services. RailTel was formed in September-2000 with the objective of creating a nationwide broadband, telecom and multimedia network, and to modernise train control operation and safety system of Indian Railways. RailTel's network passes through around 5,000 stations across the country, covering all major commercial centres. RailTel became the 22nd company to achieve Navratna status on 30-August-2024.

== History ==
The Indian Railways (IR) was initially solely dependent on the Department of Telecom (now BSNL) for their control and administrative communication circuits. To increase circuit efficiency, the Railways began building up its own communication systems from early 1970s based on overhead telephone lines, quad cables and microwave signalling. In 1983, the Railway Reforms Committee decided to introduce optical fibre cable (OFC) based communications in IR to provide safety, reliability, availability and serviceability through use of a dedicated network. The decision was also taken to create a network independent of the DoT and replace the existing microwave telecom systems (60% of which had reached end of life) with OFC.

Indian Railways commissioned the first OFC on the Churchgate–Virar line in Mumbai in 1988 for train operation and control purpose, which consisted of 60 km of network across 28 stations. The network was expanded in Central India with the commissioning of 900 km of OFC network in 1991–92 across Durg–Nagpur, Nagpur–Itarsi and Itarsi–Bhusaval sections of the Howrah–Nagpur–Mumbai line, and in Eastern India with the commissioning of 60 km of OFC network in Tatanagar–Chakradhrapur section of the same line.

The second National Telecom Policy in 1999 opened the National Long-Distance segment under favourable licensing conditions with revenue sharing to assist mobile network operators to spread their networks across India. In the year 2000, Union of India announced the formation of a telecom corporation to build a nationwide broadband multimedia telecommunication network. RailTel was established on 26-September-2000 as a Public Sector Undertaking (PSU), wholly owned by the Indian Railways.

== Projects ==
=== WiFi and WiMax ===
RailTel, formerly in collaboration with Google, provides free WiFi Internet access at selected railway stations across India. Google chose railway stations as the location to provide free WiFi because stations have access to a reliable power supply and fibre provided by RailTel, and because the passengers at a station come from all demographics of India.

The free WiFi service was launched at Mumbai Central railway station in January-2016. In April-2016, the service was expanded to nine more railway stations. In June-2016, Google announced that free WiFi was available at 19 stations in India and was being used by over 1.5 million people.

In September-2016, Google announced a public WiFi initiative called Google Station. The company planned to expand free WiFi coverage under the initiative to locations such as cafes and malls across India, and later expand worldwide.

In June-2018, Google announced that its Free WiFi project was now running at 400 Indian railway stations. As a result, there were more than 80 lakh people accessing the internet each month via the project.

The partnership between Google and RailWire ended in May-2020. Now RailWire alone provides free WiFi for 30 mins at low speed and further paid plans at 34 Mbps to more than 5,000 railway stations in India.

=== RailWire ===
Based on its nationwide fibre network, RailTel offers RailWire, a joint venture with managed service providers to provide internet, voice, video and multimedia access on a single FTTH connection at a customer's home or office.

== Awards ==
RailTel received the 12th National Awards for Excellence in Cost Management 2014.
