= List of municipal commissioners of Pune =

The Municipal Commissioner of Pune is the chief executive officer of the Pune Municipal Corporation. The Municipal Commissioner maintains Pune, and thus has responsibilities over the sewage system, the school divisions, power companies, roads, and other aspects of local infrastructure. The commissioner is an Indian Administrative Service officer appointed by the Maharashtra state government. Shri. As of 2011, Kunal Kumar is the Municipal Commissioner of Pune.

== See also ==
- Pune
- Pune Municipal Corporation
- Pune District
- Maharashtra
