= Ramwadi =

Village in Maharashtra

- village
- Location in Maharashtra, India Ramwadi (India)
- Country: India
- State: Maharashtra
- District: Solapur district

Languages
  - Official: Marathi
- Time zone: UTC+5:30 (IST)

Ramwadi is a village in the Karmala taluka of Solapur district in Maharashtra state, India.

== Demographics ==
Covering 620.75 hectares (1,533.9 acres) and comprising 215 households at the time of the 2011 census of India, Ramwadi had a population of 1148. There were 591 males and 557 females, with 143 people being aged six or younger.
