= Kasarwadi railway station =

Railway station in Pune district, India

Kasarwadi
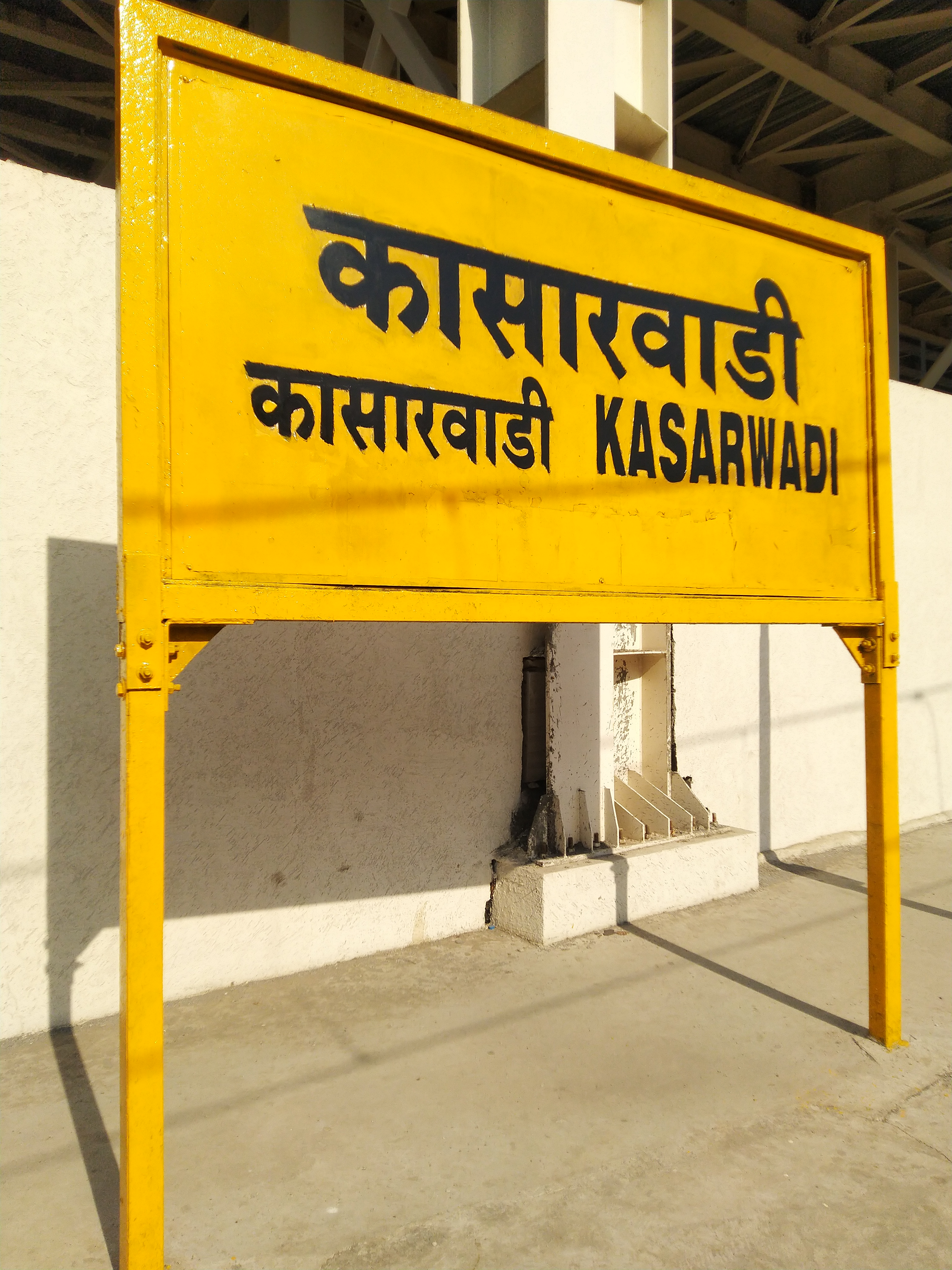

General information
- Location: Nashik Phata, Pune. India
- Coordinates: 18.6077°N 73.8210°E
- System: Pune Suburban Railway Station
- Owner: Indian Railways
- Line: Pune Suburban Railway
- Platforms: 2
- Tracks: 2

Construction
- Parking: Yes

Other information
- Status: Active
- Station code: KSWD
- Fare zone: Central Railway

Services
Preceding station	Pune Suburban Railway	Following station
Pimpri towards Lonavala	Lonavala Line	Dapodi towards Pune Junction
Location
- Location within India Location within Maharashtra

Kasarwadi railway station is a small suburban railway station of Pune Suburban Railway. The station code is KSWD. The station is on the junction of Old Mumbai–Pune Highway and Pune–Nashik Highway. Station has two platforms and a foot overbridge. Nearby areas are Kasarwadi, Nashik Phata, Bhosari, Pimple Saudagar, Pimple Nilakh.

All local trains between Pune Junction–Lonavala, Pune Junction–Talegaon, Shivaji Nagar–Lonavala, Shivaji Nagar–Talegaon and Pune Junction–Karjat Passenger stops here.
