= Sant Tukaram Nagar =

Neighbourhood in Pimpri-Chinchwad, Maharashtra

Coordinates: 18.61452°N 73.81574°E

Sant Tukaram Nagar is located in the suburbs of Pune, India.

Sant Tukaram Nagar and Vallabh Nagar are close to each other. Sant Tukaram Nagar is famous for D. Y. Patil College, Dr. D. Y. Patil Vidyapeeth, Pune and Yashwantrao Chavan Municipal Hospital (YCM) which is run by the local municipal corporation.

Sant Tukaram Nagar comes under Pimpri-Chinchwad Municipal Corporation but has its own fire department, police station and waste disposal services. Because of the colleges many students live here as paying guests, which is a significant source of income for the locals.

It has a metro, which is one of the first stations, in the Pune metro project.
