= Phugewadi metro station =

Pune Metro's Purple Line metro station in Pimpri-Chinchwad, India

Phugewadi
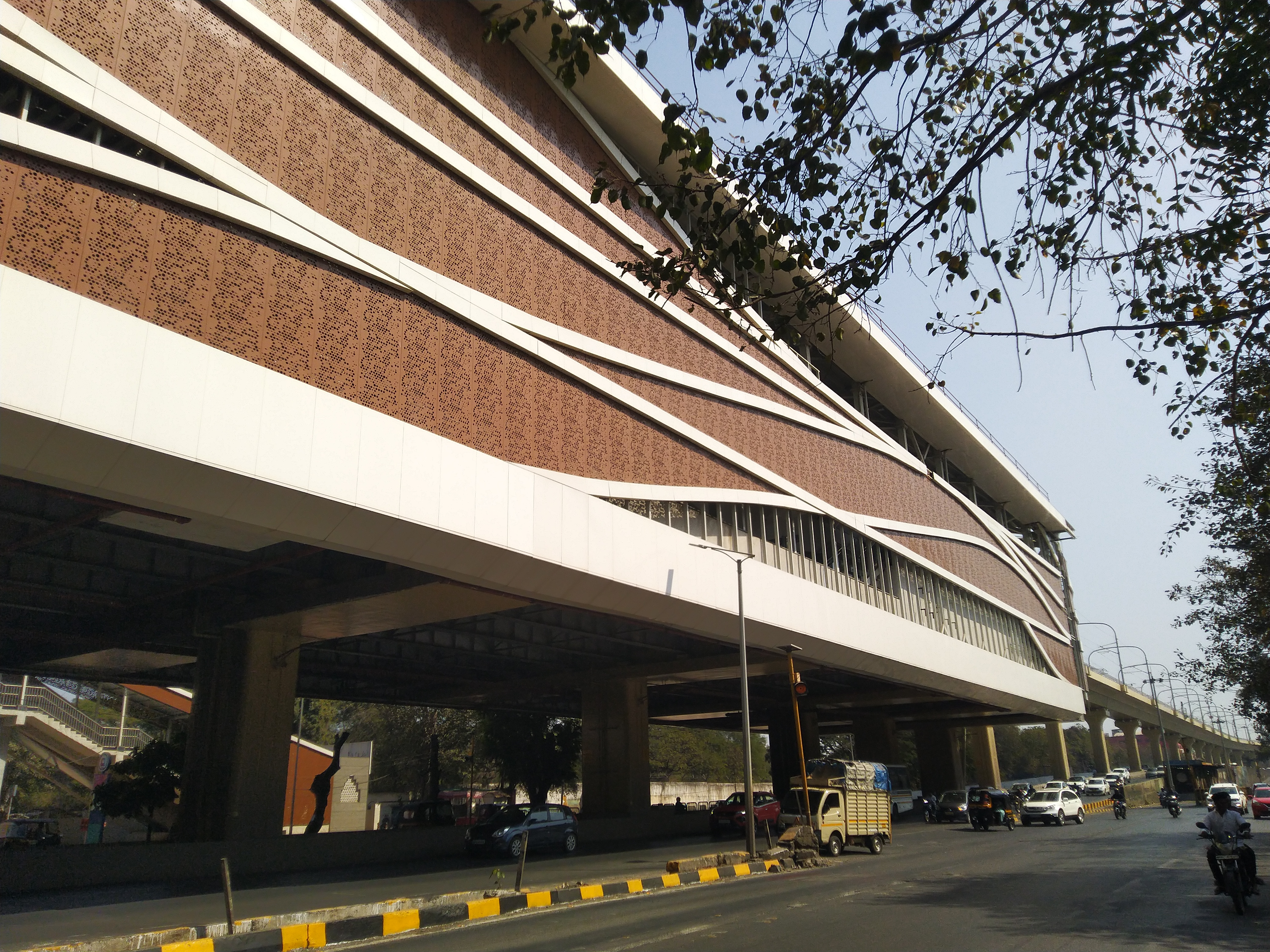

General information
- Location: Old Mumbai - Pune Hwy, Seva Nagar, Dapodi, Pimpri Chinchwad, Maharashtra 411012
- Coordinates: 18°35′28″N 73°49′52″E
- System: Pune Metro station
- Owner: Maharashtra Metro Rail Corporation Limited (Maha Metro)
- Operator: Pune Metro
- Line: Purple Line
- Platforms: Side platform Platform-1 → Swargate; Platform-2 → PCMC Bhavan
- Tracks: 2

Construction
- Structure type: Elevated, Double track
- Platform levels: 2
- Accessible: Yes

Other information
- Station code: PGD

History
- Opened: 6 March 2022; 4 years ago
- Electrified: 25 kV 50 Hz AC overhead catenary

Services
Preceding station	Pune Metro	Following station
Kasarwadi towards PCMC Bhavan	Purple Line	Dapodi towards Swargate
Route map
Location

Phugewadi is an elevated metro station on the North-South corridor of the Purple Line of Pune Metro in Pimpri Chinchwad, India. The station was opened on 6 March 2022 as an inauguration of Pune Metro. From March 2022 to July 2023, the Purple Line operated between PCMC Bhavan and Phugewadi, but from 1 August 2023 the section between Phugewadi and District Court Pune metro station came into use, so trains ran from PCMC Bhavan to Civil Court. On 29 September 2024, the launch of Pune Metro Phase I was completed and the Purple Line was fully operational from PCMC to Swargate.

== Station layout ==
G	Street level	Exit/Entrance
L1	Mezzanine	Fare control, station agent, Metro Card vending machines, crossover
L2	Side platform | Doors will open on the left
L2	Platform 1 Southbound	Towards → Swargate; Next Station: Dapodi
L2	Platform 2 Northbound	Towards ← PCMC Bhavan; Next Station: Kasarwadi
L2	Side platform | Doors will open on the left
L2

== See also ==
- Pune
- Maharashtra
- Rapid Transit in India
