= List of Pune Metro stations =

Stations of the Pune Metro

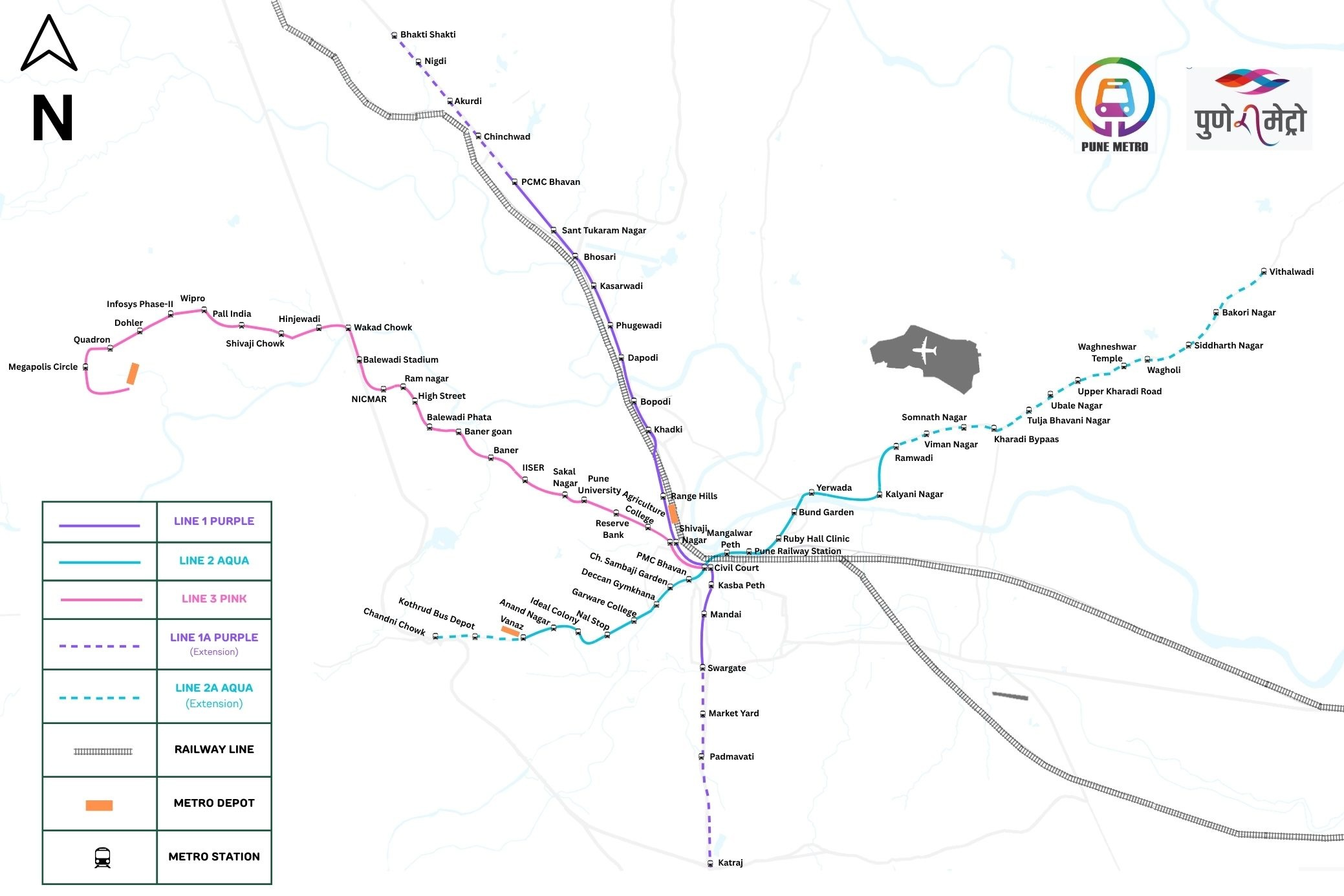
Pune Metro rail map

This is a list of all stations of the Pune Metro, a rapid transit system serving the city of Pune in Maharashtra, India. Pune Metro is the 15th metro system in India.

It is built and operated by the Maharashtra Metro Rail Corporation Limited being inaugurated and opened for public on 6 March 2022.

== Metro stations ==
†	Terminal station
*	Transfer station
††	Transfer station to Indian Railways / ISBT
#*	Terminal and transfer station to Indian Railways / ISBT

=== Operational ===
Metro Station		Line	Opened	Layout	Notes	Ref.
English	Marathi	Line	Opened	Layout	Notes	Ref.
Agriculture College	कृषी महाविद्यालय	Pink Line	4 November 2026	Elevated	–	
Anand Nagar	आनंद नगर	Aqua Line	6 March 2022	Elevated	–	
Aundh	औंध	Pink Line	4 November 2026	Elevated	–	
Bopodi	बोपोडी	Purple Line	1 August 2023	Elevated	–	
Bund Garden	बंड गार्डन	Aqua Line	6 March 2024	Elevated	–	
Chhatrapati Sambhaji Udyan	छत्रपती संभाजी उद्यान	Aqua Line	1 August 2023	Elevated	–	
Dapodi††	दापोडी	Purple Line	1 August 2023	Elevated	Interchange with Dapodi railway station	
Deccan Gymkhana	डेक्कन जिमखाना	Aqua Line	1 August 2023	Elevated	–	
District Court Pune*	जिल्हा न्यायालय पुणे	Purple Line; Aqua Line; Pink Line	1 August 2023; 4 November 2026	Elevated; Underground	–	
Garware College	गरवारे महाविद्यालय	Aqua Line	6 March 2022	Elevated	–	
Hinjawadi Phase-I	हिंजवडी फेज-१	Pink Line	4 November 2026	Elevated	–	
Hinjawadi Phase-II Circle-I	हिंजवडी फेज-२ सर्कल-१	Pink Line	4 November 2026	Elevated	–	
Hinjawadi Phase-II Circle-II	हिंजवडी फेज-२ सर्कल-२	Pink Line	4 November 2026	Elevated	–	
Kalyani Nagar	कल्याणी नगर	Aqua Line	6 March 2024	Elevated	–	
Kasarwadi††	कासारवाडी	Purple Line	6 March 2022	Elevated	Interchange with Kasarwadi railway station	
Kasba Peth	कसबा पेठ	Purple Line	29 September 2024	Underground	–	
Khadki††	खडकी	Purple Line	21 June 2025	Elevated	Interchange with Khadki railway station	
Maan	माण	Pink Line	4 November 2026	Elevated	–	
Maan Bus Depot	माण बस डेपो	Pink Line	4 November 2026	Elevated	–	
Maan - MIDC Circle Phase-II	माण - एमआयडीसी सर्कल फेज-२	Pink Line	4 November 2026	Elevated	–	
Mahatma Phule Mandai	महात्मा फुले मंडई	Purple Line	29 September 2024	Underground	–	
Mangalwar Peth	मंगळवार पेठ	Aqua Line	1 August 2023	Elevated	–	
Mitcon Balewadi	मिटकॉन बालेवाडी	Pink Line	4 November 2026	Elevated	–	
Nashik Phata	नाशिक फाटा	Purple Line	6 March 2022	Elevated	–	
Padmabhushan Chowk	पद्मभूषण चौक	Pink Line	4 November 2026	Elevated	–	
Paud Phata	पौड फाटा	Aqua Line	6 March 2022	Elevated	–	
PCMC Bhavan†	पिंपरी-चिंचवड महानगरपालिका भवन	Purple Line	6 March 2022	Elevated	–	
Phugewadi	फुगेवाडी	Purple Line	6 March 2022	Elevated	–	
PMC Bhavan	पुणे महानगरपालिका भवन	Aqua Line	1 August 2023	Elevated	–	
Pune Railway Station††	पुणे रेल्वे स्थानक	Aqua Line	1 August 2023	Elevated	Interchange with Pune Junction railway station	
R K Laxman Museum Balewadi	आर.के. लक्ष्मण संग्रहालय बालेवाडी	Pink Line	4 November 2026	Elevated	–	
Ramwadi†	रामवाडी	Aqua Line	6 March 2024	Elevated	–	
Ruby Hall Clinic	रुबी हॉल क्लिनिक	Aqua Line	1 August 2023	Elevated	–	
Sakal Nagar	सकाळ नगर	Pink Line	4 November 2026	Elevated	–	
Sant Tukaram Nagar	संत तुकाराम नगर	Purple Line	6 March 2022	Elevated	–	
Savitribai Phule Pune University	सावित्रीबाई फुले पुणे विद्यापीठ	Pink Line	4 November 2026	Elevated	–	
Shivaji Nagar††	शिवाजी नगर	Purple Line; Pink Line	1 August 2023; Under construction	Underground	Interchange with Shivaji Nagar railway station	
Shree Shiv Chhatrapati Shivaji Maharaj Chowk Hinjawadi	श्री शिवछत्रपती शिवाजी महाराज चौक हिंजवडी	Pink Line	4 November 2026	Elevated	–	
Shree Shiv Chhatrapati Sports Complex Mahalunge	श्री शिवछत्रपती क्रीडा संकुल महाळुंगे	Pink Line	4 November 2026	Elevated	–	
Swargate#*	स्वारगेट	Purple Line	29 September 2024	Underground	–	
SNDT College	एसएनडीटी कॉलेज	Aqua Line	6 March 2022	Elevated	–	
Vanaz†	वनाझ	Aqua Line	6 March 2022	Elevated	–	
Wakad Chowk	वाकड चौक	Pink Line	4 November 2026	Elevated	–	
Yerwada	येरवडा	Aqua Line	21 August 2024	Elevated	–	

=== Under construction ===
Metro Station		Line	Opened	Layout	Notes	Ref.
English	Marathi	Line	Opened	Layout	Notes	Ref.
Akurdi††	आकुर्डी	Purple Line	Under construction	Elevated	Interchange with Akurdi railway station	
Bakori Phata	बकोरी फाटा	Aqua Line	Under construction	Elevated	–	
Balaji Nagar	बालाजी नगर	Purple Line	Under construction	Elevated	–	
Balewadi High Street	बालेवाडी हायस्ट्रीट	Pink Line	Under construction	Elevated	–	
Balewadi Phata	बालेवाडी फाटा	Pink Line	Under construction	Elevated	–	
Baner Gaon	बाणेर गाव	Pink Line	Under construction	Elevated	–	
Baner Pashan Link Road	बाणेर पाषाण जोडरस्ता	Pink Line	Under construction	Elevated	–	
Bhakti Shakti	भक्ती शक्ती	Purple Line	Under construction	Elevated	–	
Bhosale Nagar - RBI	भोसले नगर - आरबीआय	Pink Line	Under construction	Elevated	–	
Bibwewadi	बिबवेवाडी	Purple Line	Under construction	Elevated	–	
Chandni Chowk	चांदणी चौक	Aqua Line	Under construction	Elevated	–	
Chinchwad††	चिंचवड	Purple Line	Under construction	Elevated	Interchange with Chinchwad railway station	
Katraj	कात्रज	Purple Line	Under construction	Elevated	–	
Kharadi Bypass	खराडी बायपास	Aqua Line	Under construction	Elevated	–	
Kothrud Bus Depot	कोथरूड बस डेपो	Aqua Line	Under construction	Elevated	–	
Market Yard	मार्केट यार्ड	Purple Line	Under construction	Elevated	–	
Nigdi	निगडी	Purple Line	Under construction	Elevated	–	
Padmavati	पद्मावती	Purple Line	Under construction	Elevated	–	
Range Hills	रेंज हिल्स	Purple Line	Under construction	Elevated	–	
Siddharth Nagar	सिद्धार्थ नगर	Aqua Line	Under construction	Elevated	–	
Somnath Nagar	सोमनाथ नगर	Aqua Line	Under construction	Elevated	–	
Tulja Bhavani Nagar	तुळजा भवानी नगर	Aqua Line	Under construction	Elevated	–	
Ubale Nagar	उबाळे नगर	Aqua Line	Under construction	Elevated	–	
Upper Kharadi Road	अप्पर खराडी रस्ता	Aqua Line	Under construction	Elevated	–	
Viman Nagar	विमान नगर	Aqua Line	Under construction	Elevated	–	
Vithalwadi	विठ्ठलवाडी	Aqua Line	Under construction	Elevated	–	
Wagheshwar Temple	वाघेश्वर मंदिर	Aqua Line	Under construction	Elevated	–	
Wagholi	वाघोली	Aqua Line	Under construction	Elevated	–	

== Statistics ==
Total number of metro stations	72
Total number of metro stations operational	44
Total number of metro stations under construction	28
Number of interchange stations	2
Number of elevated stations	68
Number of underground stations	5
Number of at-grade stations	0

== See also ==
- List of Ahmedabad Metro stations
- List of Chennai Metro stations
- List of Coimbatore Metro stations
- List of Delhi Metro stations
- List of Hyderabad Metro stations
- List of Jaipur Metro stations
- List of Kochi Metro stations
- List of Kolkata Metro stations
- List of Lucknow Metro stations
- List of Madurai Metro stations
- List of Mumbai Metro stations
- List of Noida Metro stations
- List of Nagpur Metro stations
- List of Namma Metro stations
- List of Navi Mumbai Metro Stations
- List of Surat Metro stations
