= SNDT College metro station =

Pune Metro's Aqua Line metro station

SNDT College
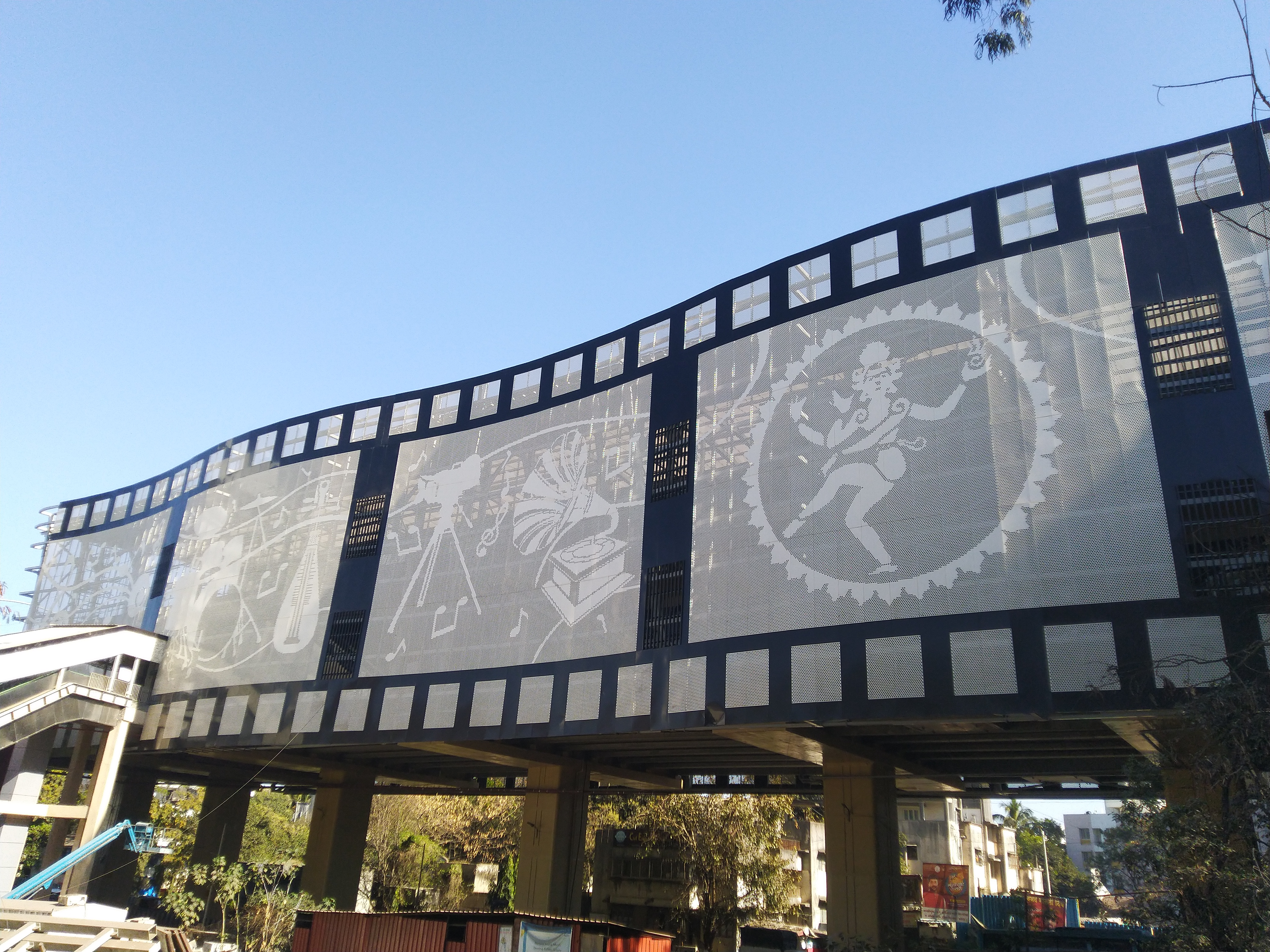

General information
- Location: Pune
- Coordinates: 18°30′26″N 73°49′43″E
- System: Pune Metro station
- Owner: Maharashtra Metro Rail Corporation Limited (Maha Metro)
- Operator: Pune Metro
- Line: Aqua Line
- Platforms: Side platform Platform-1 → Ramwadi; Platform-2 → Vanaz
- Tracks: 2

Construction
- Structure type: Elevated, Double track
- Platform levels: 2
- Accessible: Yes

Other information
- Station code: NST

History
- Opened: 6 March 2022; 4 years ago
- Electrified: 25 kV 50 Hz AC overhead catenary

Services
Preceding station	Pune Metro	Following station
Paud Phata towards Vanaz	Aqua Line	Garware College towards Ramwadi
Route map
Location

SNDT College (until Dec. 2025 Nal Stop) is an elevated metro station on the East-West corridor of the Aqua Line of Pune Metro in Pune, India. The station was opened on 6 March 2022 as an inauguration of Pune Metro and was the first to be completed. From March 2022 to August 2023, the Aqua Line was operational between Vanaz and Garware College. The extended section between Garware College to Ruby Hall Clinic was inaugurated on 1 August 2023. So the metro operated from Vanaz to Ruby Hall Clinic. Later the remaining stretch was completed and the line operates till Ramwadi from 6 March 2024.

In December 2025, the station was renamed into SNDT College, the Women's University which is nearby.

== Station layout ==
G	Street level	Exit/Entrance
L1	Mezzanine	Fare control, station agent, Metro Card vending machines, crossover
L2	Side platform | Doors will open on the left
L2	Platform 1 Eastbound	Towards → Ramwadi; Next Station: Garware College
L2	Platform 2 Westbound	Towards ← Vanaz; Next Station: Ideal Colony
L2	Side platform | Doors will open on the left
L3

== See also ==
- Pune
- Maharashtra
- Rapid Transit in India
