= District Court Pune metro station =

Metro station in Pune, India

District Court Pune जिल्हा न्यायालय स्थानक
- Civil Court metro station

General information
- Location: Shivajinagar, Pune, Maharashtra 411001; Pune; India
- Coordinates: 18°31′37″N 73°51′29″E
- System: Pune Metro station
- Owner: Maharashtra Metro Rail Corporation Limited (Maha Metro)
- Operator: Pune Metro
- Lines: Operational; Purple Line; Aqua Line; Pink Line
- Platforms: Side platform Platform-1 → Ramwadi; Platform-2 → Vanaz; Island platform Platform-3 → Swargate; Platform-4 → PCMC Bhavan; Side Platform; Platform-5 → Megapolis Circle; Platform-6 → Terminus
- Tracks: 4

Construction
- Structure type: Underground, Elevated, Double track
- Platform levels: 4
- Accessible: Yes

Other information
- Station code: CVC
- Website: https://www.punemetrorail.org/station/district-court/

History
- Opened: 1 August 2023; 3 years ago
- Former names: Civil Court

Passengers
- An average of about 24,878 passengers interchange between the Purple Line and Aqua Line every day at the District Court (Civil Court) Metro Station

Services
Preceding station	Pune Metro	Following station
PMC Bhavan towards Vanaz	Aqua Line	Mangalwar Peth towards Ramwadi
Shivaji Nagar towards PCMC Bhavan	Purple Line	Kasba Peth towards Swargate
Terminus	Pink Line	Shivaji Nagar towards Megapolis Circle
Route map
Location

District Court Pune (formerly known as "Civil Court Metro Station") is a metro station that facilitates cross-platform interchange between the Aqua Line and the Purple Line in Pune, India. The station was opened on 1 August 2023 as an extension of Pune Metro Phase I. This station will also serve as a future interchange for Pink Line of the Pune Metro. The platform on the Purple Line is one of the deepest in India at a depth of 33 m (108 ft.). The architectural design of the station's roof permits natural sunlight to penetrate directly to the underground platforms It is outfitted with modern high-capacity escalators, elevators, facilities for specially abled people, and dedicated parking spaces for vehicles .

== Station layout ==
Aqua Line - Station Layout

G	Street level	Exit/Entrance
L1	Mezzanine	Fare control, station agent, Metro Card vending machines, crossover
L2	Side platform | Doors will open on the left
L2	Platform 1 Eastbound	Towards → Ramwadi; Next Station: Mangalwar Peth
L2	Platform 2 Westbound	Towards ← Vanaz; Next Station: PMC Bhavan
L2	Side platform | Doors will open on the left
L3

Purple Line - Station Layout

G	Street level	Exit/ Entrance
M	Mezzanine	Fare control, station agent, Ticket/token, shops
P	Platform 3 Southbound	Towards → Swargate; Next Station: Kasba Peth
P	Island platform | Doors will open on the right
P	Platform 4 Westbound	Towards ← PCMC Bhavan; Next Station: Shivaji Nagar

Pink Line - Station Layout

G	Street level	Exit/Entrance
P	Mezzanine	Fare control, station agent, Metro Card vending machines, crossover
L2	Side platform | Doors will open on the left
L2	Platform 5 Northbound	Towards → Megapolis Circle metro station Next Station: Shivaji Nagar
L2	Platform 6 Southbound	Towards ← Train Terminates Here
L2	Side platform | Doors will open on the left

== Entry/Exit ==
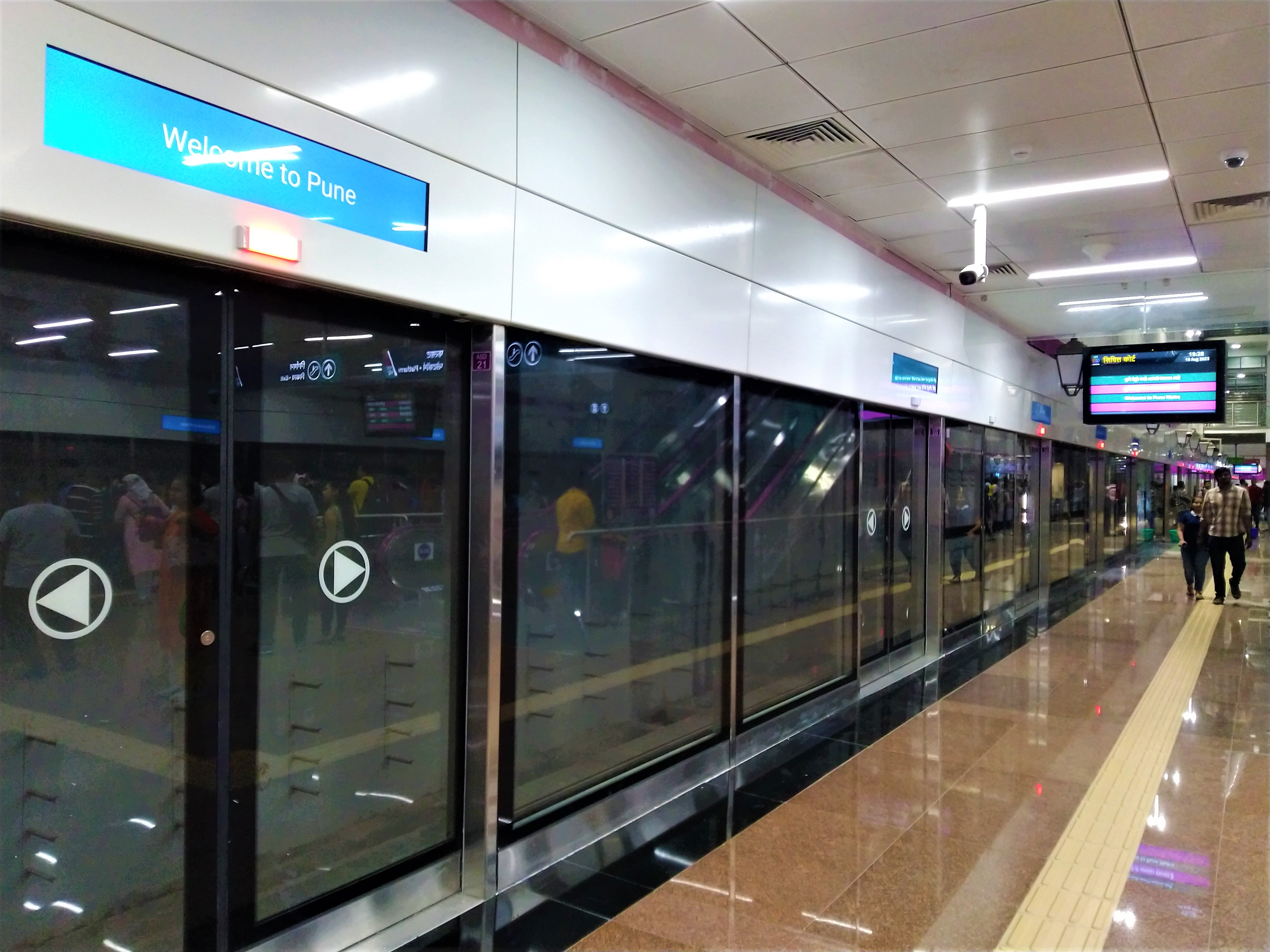
Automatic doors at the underground section.

Escalators in interchange floor.

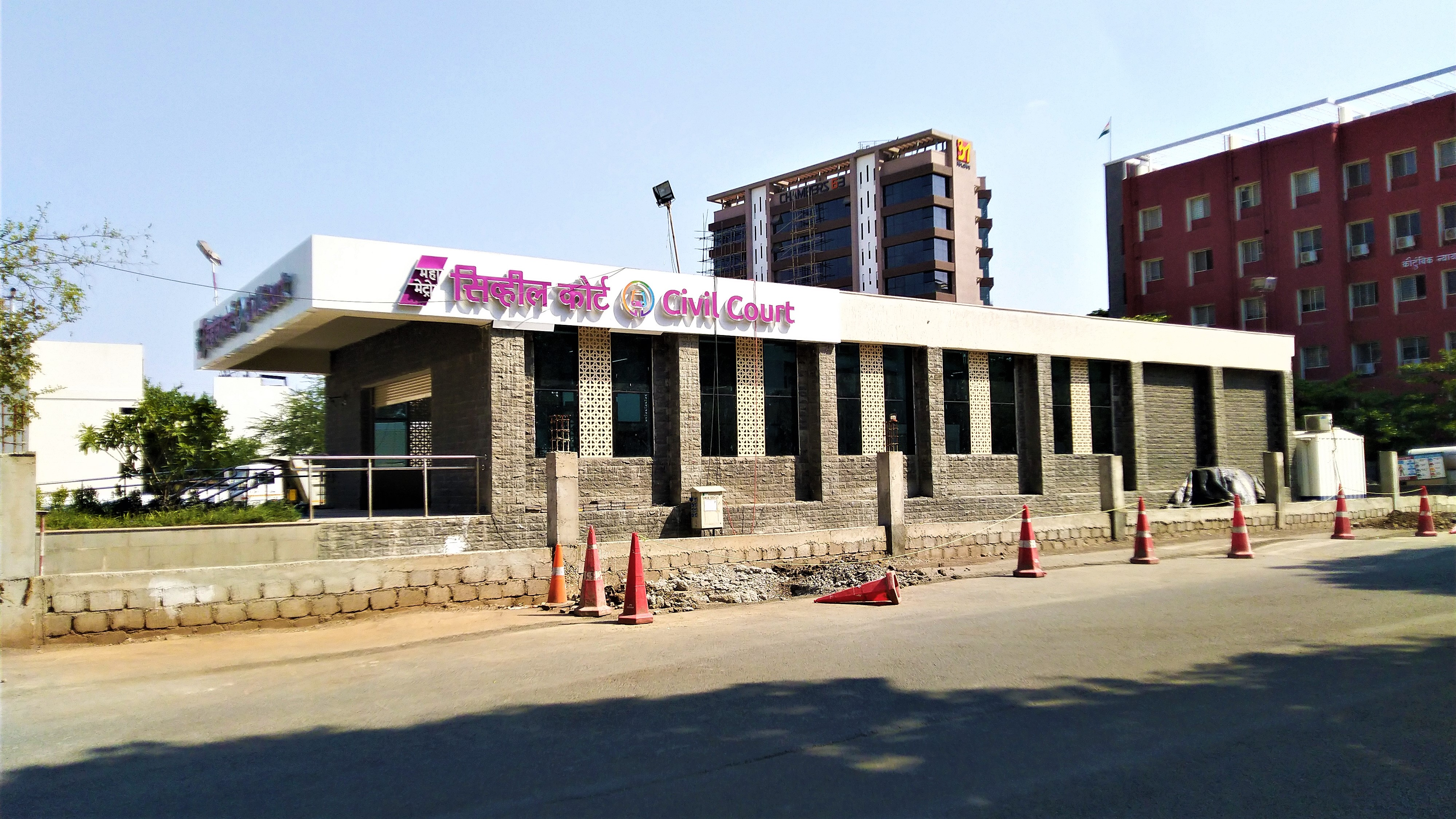
WIP of entry gate

== See also ==
- Pune
- Maharashtra
- Rapid Transit in India
