= Pune Railway Station metro station =

Pune Metro's Aqua Line metro station

Pune Railway Station
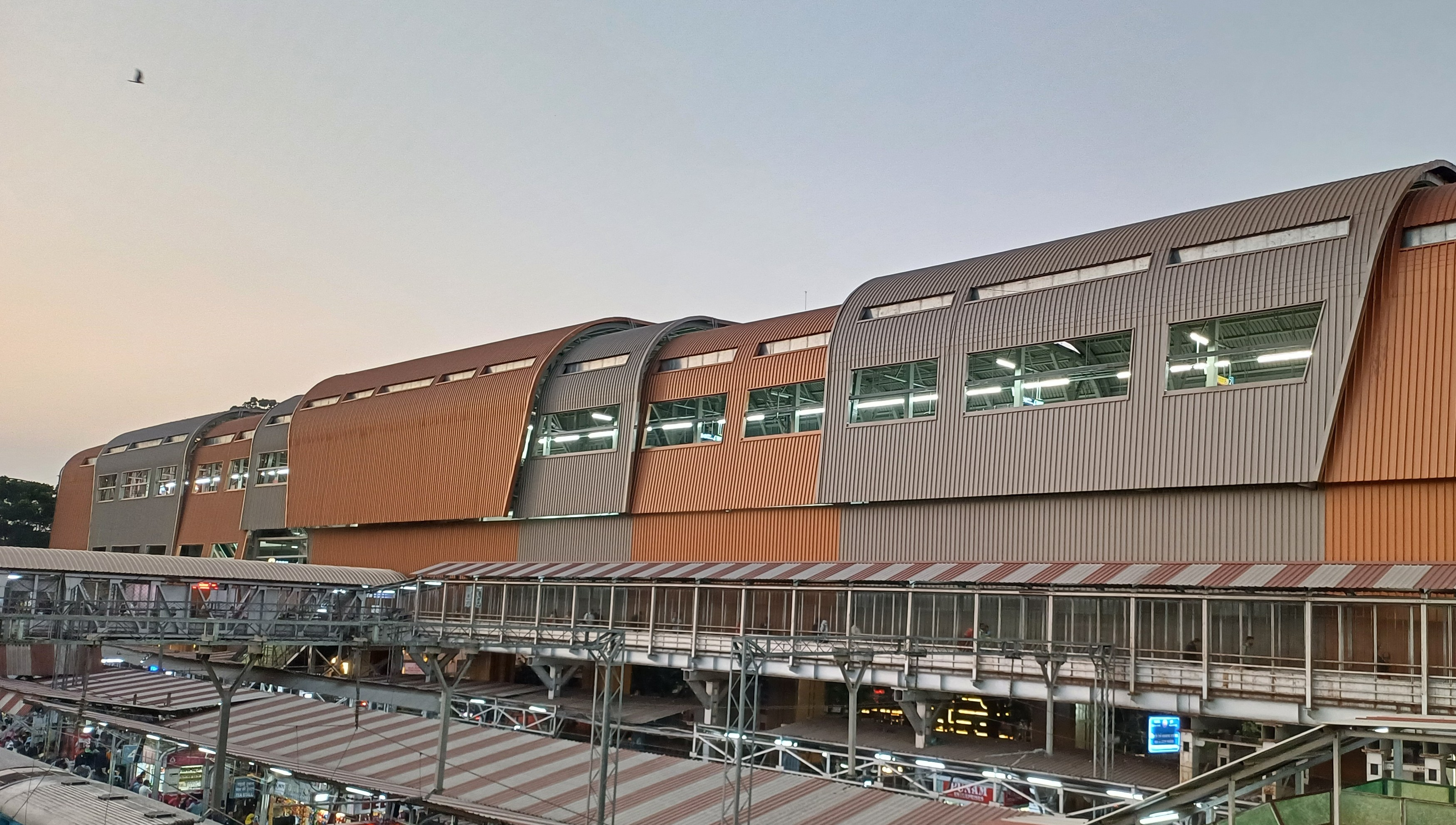

General information
- Location: 564, Raja Bahadur Mill Rd, Sangamvadi, Pune, Maharashtra 411001
- Coordinates: 18°31′47″N 73°52′21″E
- System: Pune Metro station
- Owner: Maharashtra Metro Rail Corporation Limited (MAHA-METRO)
- Operator: Pune Metro
- Line: Aqua Line
- Platforms: Side platform Platform-1 → Ramwadi; Platform-2 → Vanaz
- Tracks: 2
- Connections: Pune Junction

Construction
- Structure type: Elevated, Double track
- Accessible: Yes

Other information
- Station code: PRS

History
- Opened: 1 August 2023; 3 years ago

Passengers
- Sept 2024: ▲3,43,724

Services
Preceding station	Pune Metro	Following station
Mangalwar Peth towards Vanaz	Aqua Line	Ruby Hall Clinic towards Ramwadi
Route map
Location

Pune Railway Station is an important elevated metro station on the east–west corridor of the Aqua Line of Pune Metro in Pune, India, which holds the main Pune Junction railway station. The station was opened on 1 August 2023 as an extension of Pune Metro Phase I. Aqua Line operates between Vanaz and Ramwadi.

== Station layout ==
G	Street level	Exit/Entrance
L1	Mezzanine	Fare control, station agent, Metro Card vending machines, crossover
L2	Side platform | Doors will open on the left
L2	Platform 1 Eastbound	Towards → Ramwadi; Next Station: Ruby Hall Clinic
L2	Platform 2 Westbound	Towards ← Vanaz; Next Station: Mangalwar Peth
L2	Side platform | Doors will open on the left
L3

== See also ==
- Pune
- Maharashtra
- Rapid Transit in India
