= Yerwada metro station =

Pune Metro's Aqua Line metro station

Yerwada
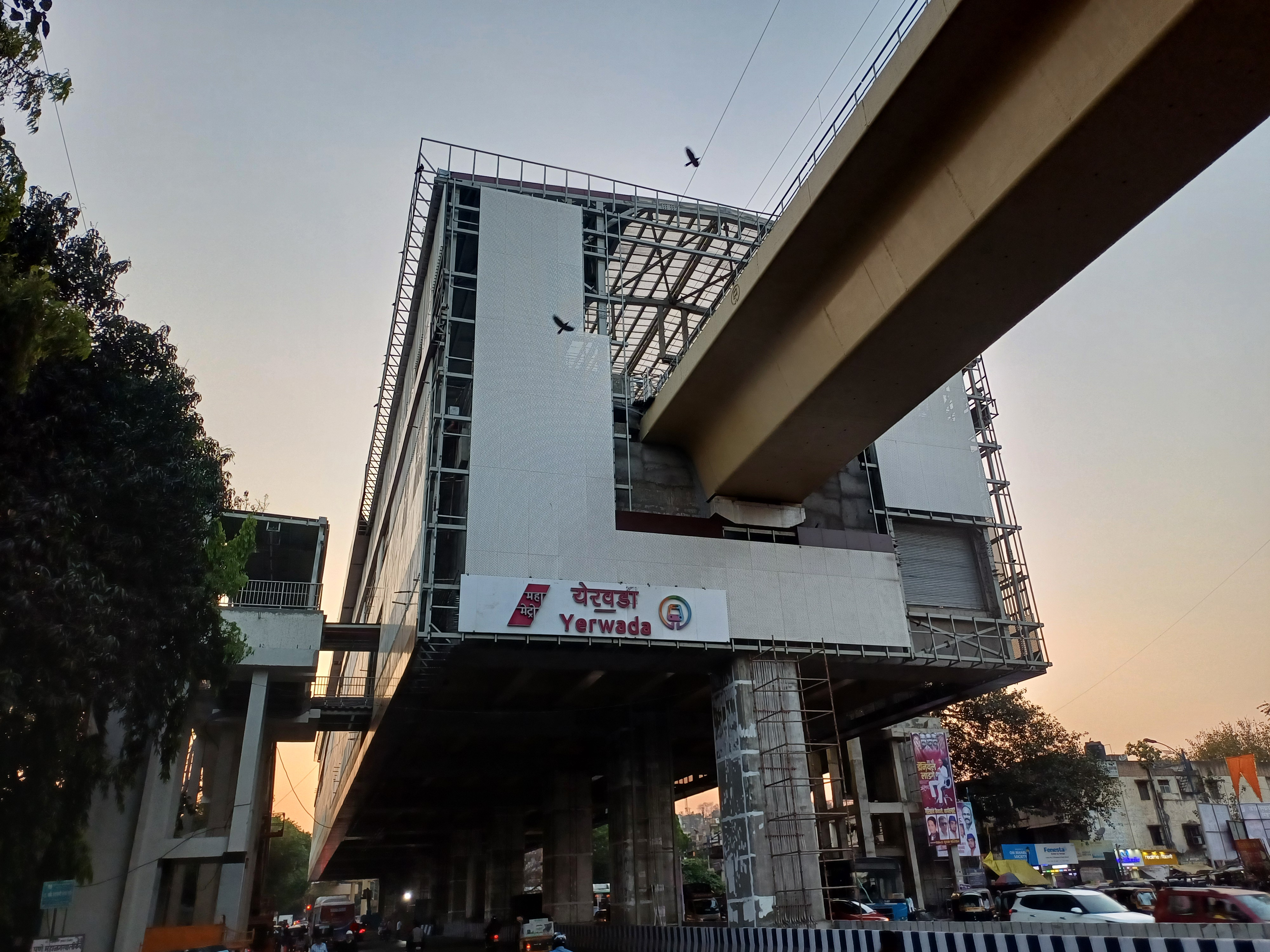

General information
- Location: Yerwada, Pune, Maharashtra 411006
- Coordinates: 18°32′43″N 73°53′11″E
- System: Pune Metro station
- Owner: Maharashtra Metro Rail Corporation Limited (MAHA-METRO)
- Operator: Pune Metro
- Line: Aqua Line
- Platforms: Side platform Platform-1 → Ramwadi; Platform-2 → Vanaz
- Tracks: 2

Construction
- Structure type: Elevated, Double track
- Platform levels: 2
- Accessible: Yes

Other information
- Station code: YER

History
- Opened: 21 August 2024; 2 years ago
- Electrified: 25 kV 50 Hz AC overhead catenary

Services
Preceding station	Pune Metro	Following station
Bund Garden towards Vanaz	Aqua Line	Kalyani Nagar towards Ramwadi
Route map
Location

Yerwada is an elevated metro station on the East - West corridor of the Aqua Line of Pune Metro in Pune, India. It is connected to Rainbow Bus Rapid Transit System. Aqua Line operates between Vanaz and Ramwadi stations. The facade of the station showcases an illustration of Dandi March and a charkha, both of which are inspired by and a tribute to Mahatma Gandhi.

The three metro stations on the extended stretch of the Aqua Line were inaugurated on 6 March 2024. However, the work on revised entry-exit points of Yerwada station delayed its initial commercial operation for more than a month. Later, it was expected to open in May 2024 as the work was supposed to complete by the end of April 2024. Due to ongoing work and pending inspection, the opening was further delayed to July 2024. The inspection by CMRS was slated to be completed by 20 July 2024 and then opened to public by the end of July 2024. Eventually, it was inaugurated for commercial operation on 21 August 2024. The shuttle service of bus no.19 by PMPML from Ramwadi metro station to Pune Airport was shifted to Yerwada with immediate effect after the latter was inaugurated.

== Station layout ==
G	Street level	Exit/Entrance
L1	Mezzanine	Fare control, station agent, Metro Card vending machines, crossover
L2	Side platform | Doors will open on the left
L2	Platform 1 Eastbound	Towards → Ramwadi; Next Station: Kalyani Nagar
L2	Platform 2 Westbound	Towards ← Vanaz; Next Station: Bund Garden
L2	Side platform | Doors will open on the left
L3

== See also ==
- Pune
- Maharashtra
- Rapid Transit in India
