= Aqua Line (Pune Metro) =

Rapid transit railway line of Pune Metro

Aqua Line (Line 2)
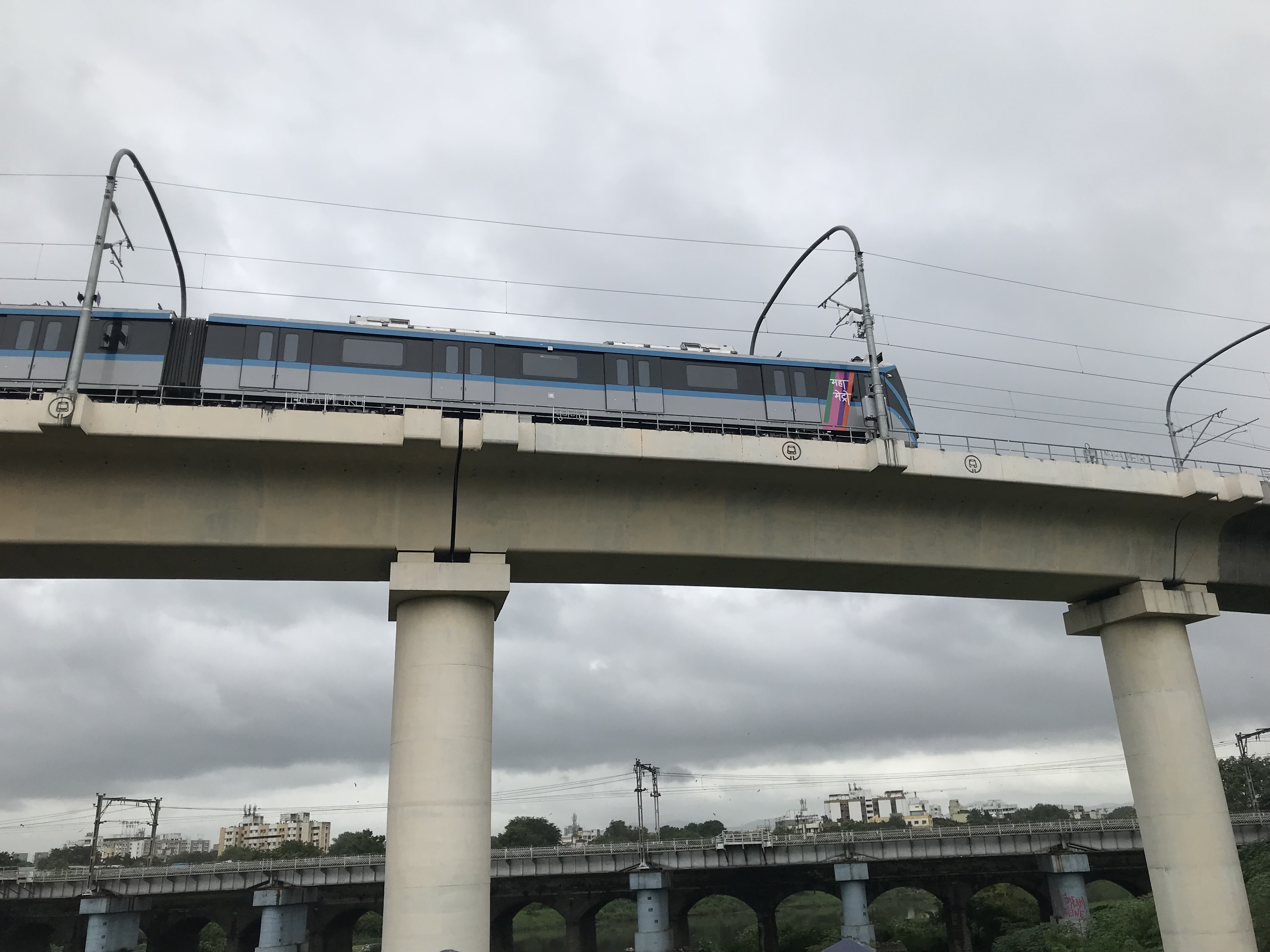
- Pune Aqua line

Overview
- Status: Operational
- Locale: Pune
- Termini: Vanaz; Ramwadi
- Stations: 16 (Operational)

Service
- Type: Rapid Transit
- System: Pune Metro
- Operator: MahaMetro
- Rolling stock: Titagarh Firema

History
- Opened: 6 March 2022; 4 years ago
- Completed: 6 March 2024

Technical
- Line length: 14.66 km (Operational)
- Character: Elevated

The Aqua Line (Line 2) of the Pune Metro is the second line of the city's mass transit network. It runs from Ramwadi to Vanaz, passing through key locations such as Mangalwar Peth and Deccan Gymkhana. The section from Vanaz to Garware College was inaugurated on 6 March 2022 by Prime Minister Narendra Modi. The extension from Garware College to Ruby Hall Clinic was opened on 1 August 2023, and the remaining stretch to Ramwadi was completed and inaugurated on 6 March 2024.

== Route ==
The Aqua Line of the Pune Metro is an elevated line covering a distance of 14.66 km (9.11 mi) and includes 16 stations. It connects with the Line 1 (Purple Line) and Line 3 at the District Court interchange station. The maintenance depot for the Aqua Line is situated near the Vanaz station on land previously used as a garbage depot.

== List of stations ==
Following is a list of stations on this route:

Aqua Line
#	Station name		Opening	Connections	Layout
#	English	Marathi	Opening	Connections	Layout
1	Chandni Chowk	चांदणी चौक	Under construction	None	Elevated
2	Kothrud Bus Depot	कोथरूड बस डेपो	Under construction	PMPML	Elevated
3	Vanaz	वनाझ	6 March 2022	None	Elevated
4	Anand Nagar	आनंद नगर	6 March 2022	None	Elevated
5	Paud Phata	पौड फाटा	6 March 2022	None	Elevated
6	SNDT College	एसएनडीटी कॉलेज	6 March 2022	Line 4A	Elevated
7	Garware College	गरवारे महाविद्यालय	6 March 2022	None	Elevated
8	Deccan Gymkhana	डेक्कन जिमखाना	1 August 2023	Deccan Gymkhana PMPML Bus Station	Elevated
9	Chhatrapati Sambhaji Udyan	छत्रपती संभाजी उद्यान	1 August 2023	None	Elevated
10	PMC Bhavan	पुणे महानगरपालिका भवन	1 August 2023	None	Elevated
11	District Court Pune	जिल्हा न्यायालय पुणे	1 August 2023	Purple Line; Pink Line	Elevated
12	R.T.O. Pune	आर.टी.ओ. पुणे	1 August 2023	None	Elevated
13	Pune Railway Station	पुणे रेल्वे स्थानक	1 August 2023	Pune Junction	Elevated
14	Ruby Hall Clinic	रुबी हॉल क्लिनिक	1 August 2023	Ruby Hall Clinic PMPML Bus Station	Elevated
15	Bund Garden	बंड गार्डन	6 March 2024	None	Elevated
16	Yerwada	येरवडा	21 August 2024	Rainbow BRTS	Elevated
17	Kalyani Nagar	कल्याणी नगर	6 March 2024	None	Elevated
18	Ramwadi	रामवाडी	6 March 2024	Rainbow BRTS	Elevated
19	Viman Nagar	विमान नगर	Approved	None	Elevated
20	Somnath Nagar	सोमनाथ नगर	Approved	None	Elevated
21	Kharadi Bypass	खराडी बायपास	Approved	Line 4	Elevated
22	Tulaja Bhavani Nagar	तुळजा भवानी नगर	Approved	None	Elevated
23	Ubale Nagar	उबाळे नगर	Approved	None	Elevated
24	Upper Kharadi Road	अप्पर खराडी रस्ता	Approved	None	Elevated
25	Wagheshwar Temple	वाघेश्वर मंदिर	Approved	None	Elevated
26	Wagholi	वाघोली	Approved	None	Elevated
27	Siddharth Nagar	सिद्धार्थ नगर	Approved	None	Elevated
28	Bakori Phata	बकोरी फाटा	Approved	None	Elevated
29	Vitthalawadi	विठ्ठलवाडी	Approved	None	Elevated

== Infrastructure ==
=== Signalling ===
The Aqua Line utilises the Alstom Urbalis 400 communications-based train control (CBTC) signalling system. Alstom was awarded a EUR90 million contract to supply the signalling and telecommunications systems for the Aqua and Purple Lines, as well as Mumbai Metro Yellow Line 2 and Red Line 7.
