= Bund Garden metro station =

Pune Metro's Aqua Line metro station

Bund Garden
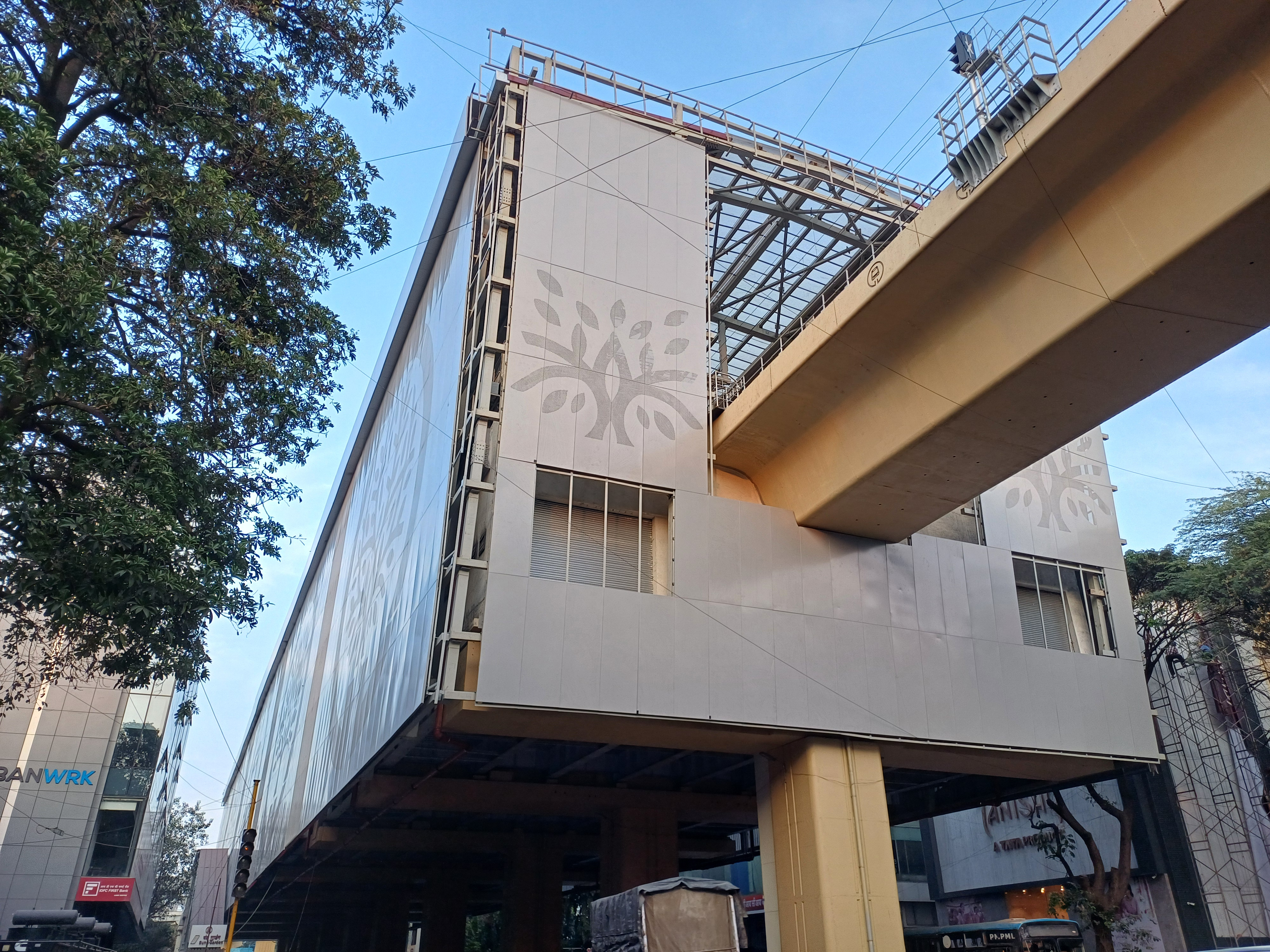

General information
- Location: Bund Garden, Pune, Maharashtra 411001
- Coordinates: 18°32′25″N 73°53′00″E
- System: Pune Metro station
- Owner: Maharashtra Metro Rail Corporation Limited (MAHA-METRO)
- Operator: Pune Metro
- Line: Aqua Line
- Platforms: Side platform Platform-1 → Ramwadi; Platform-2 → Vanaz
- Tracks: 2

Construction
- Structure type: Elevated, Double track
- Platform levels: 2
- Accessible: Yes

Other information
- Station code: BUN

History
- Opened: 6 March 2024; 2 years ago
- Electrified: 25 kV 50 Hz AC overhead catenary

Services
Preceding station	Pune Metro	Following station
Ruby Hall Clinic towards Vanaz	Aqua Line	Yerwada towards Ramwadi
Route map
Location

Bund Garden is an elevated eastern terminal metro station on the East - West corridor of the Aqua Line of Pune Metro in Pune, India. It was opened on 6 March 2024 as an extension of Pune Metro Phase I. The trial run from this station till Ramwadi was started in September 2023. Aqua Line operates between Vanaz and Ramwadi stations. It is located in the vicinity of an upmarket residential area with restaurants, schools and malls. The design of the station facade is inspired by elements of nature.

== Station layout ==
G	Street level	Exit/Entrance
L1	Mezzanine	Fare control, station agent, Metro Card vending machines, crossover
L2	Side platform | Doors will open on the left
L2	Platform 1 Eastbound	Towards → Ramwadi; Next Station: Yerwada
L2	Platform 2 Westbound	Towards ← Vanaz; Next Station: Ruby Hall Clinic
L2	Side platform | Doors will open on the left
L3

== See also ==
- Pune
- Maharashtra
- Rapid Transit in India
