= Chhatrapati Sambhaji Udyan metro station =

Pune Metro's Aqua Line metro station

Chhatrapati Sambhaji Udyan
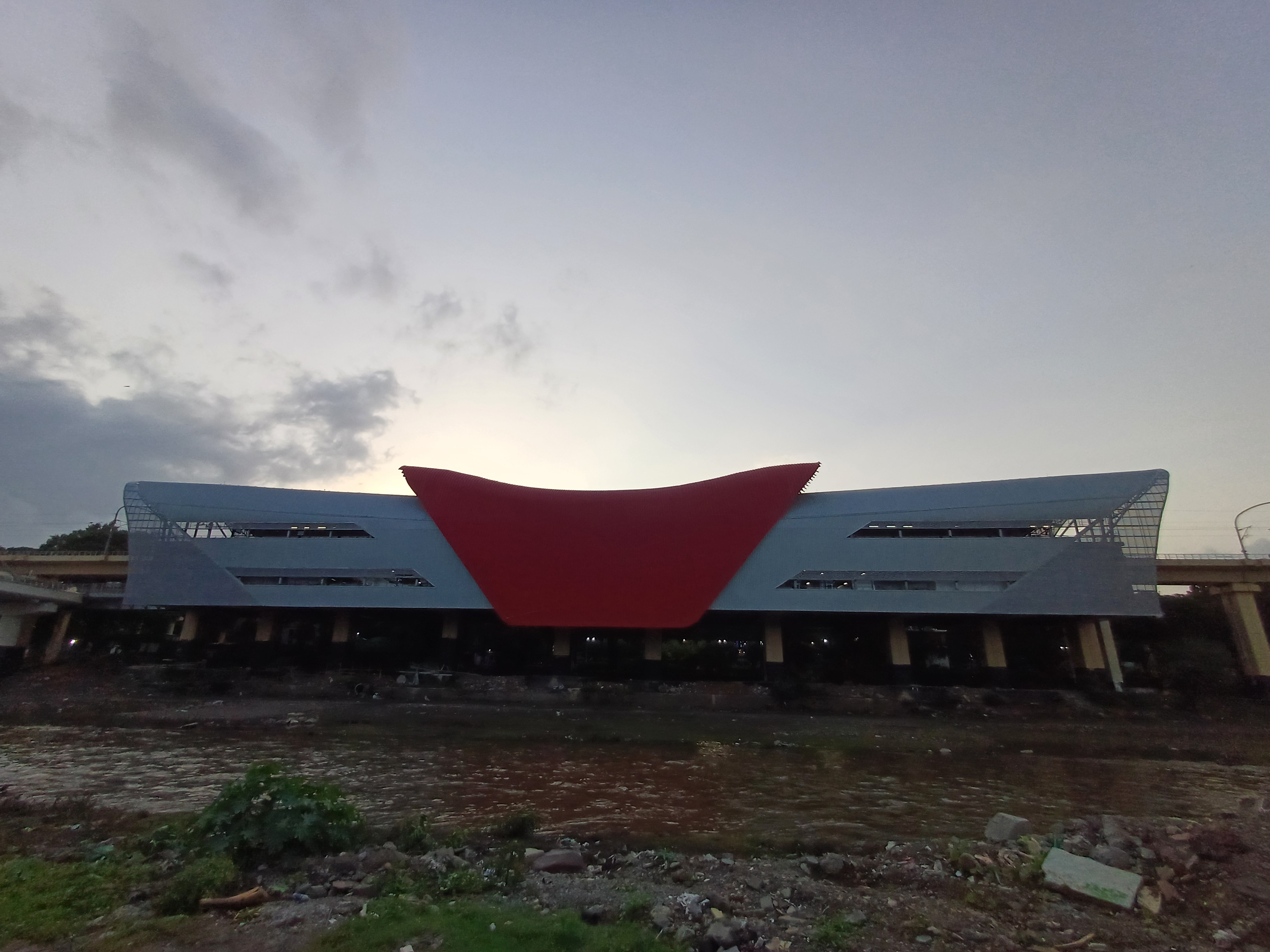

General information
- Location: Shivajinagar, Pune, Maharashtra 411004
- Coordinates: 18°31′13″N 73°50′51″E
- System: Pune Metro station
- Owner: Maharashtra Metro Rail Corporation Limited (MAHA-METRO)
- Operator: Pune Metro
- Line: Aqua Line
- Platforms: Side platform Platform-1 → Ramwadi; Platform-2 → Vanaz
- Tracks: 2

Construction
- Structure type: Elevated, Double track
- Platform levels: 2
- Accessible: Yes

Other information
- Station code: SAN

History
- Opened: 1 August 2023; 3 years ago
- Electrified: 25 kV 50 Hz AC overhead catenary

Services
Preceding station	Pune Metro	Following station
Deccan Gymkhana towards Vanaz	Aqua Line	PMC Bhavan towards Ramwadi
Route map
Location

Chhatrapati Sambhaji Udyan is an elevated metro station on the East-West corridor of the Aqua Line of Pune Metro in Pune, India. The station was opened on 1 August 2023 as an extension of Pune Metro Phase I. Aqua Line operates between Vanaz and Ruby Hall Clinic.

Located on the banks of Mutha River, the station is 26m high, 28m wide and 140m long. Its design is inspired by the Mavala Pagadi (turban) popularised by Shivaji Maharaj. A skywalk near Bal Gandharva Ranga Mandir on J. M. Road has been built to reach the station. In order to improve connectivity for passengers living in peth areas of the city, a cable-supported skywalk in the shape of tanpura is being constructed from the riverside road to the station.

== Station layout ==
G	Street level	Exit/Entrance
L1	Mezzanine	Fare control, station agent, Metro Card vending machines, crossover
L2	Side platform | Doors will open on the left
L2	Platform 1 Eastbound	Towards → Ramwadi; Next Station: PMC Bhavan
L2	Platform 2 Westbound	Towards ← Vanaz; Next Station: Deccan Gymkhana
L2	Side platform | Doors will open on the left
L3

== See also ==
- Pune
- Maharashtra
- Rapid Transit in India
