= PMC Bhavan metro station =

Pune Metro's Aqua Line metro station

PMC Bhavan
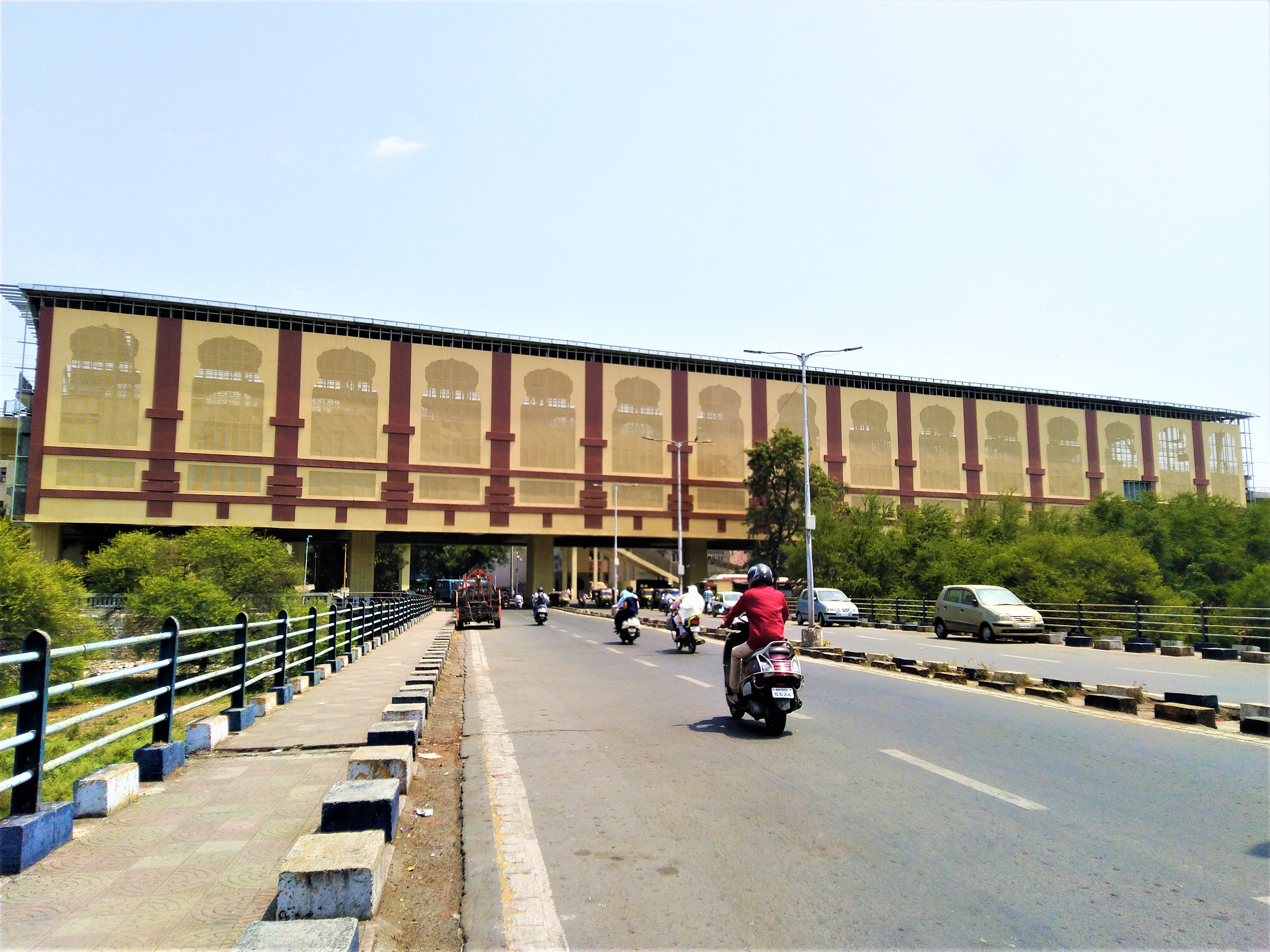

General information
- Location: Shivajinagar, Pune, Maharashtra 411005
- Coordinates: 18°31′22″N 73°51′13″E
- System: Pune Metro station
- Owner: Maharashtra Metro Rail Corporation Limited (Maha Metro)
- Operator: Pune Metro
- Line: Aqua Line
- Platforms: Side platform Platform-1 → Ramwadi; Platform-2 → Vanaz
- Tracks: 2

Construction
- Structure type: Elevated, Double track
- Platform levels: 2
- Accessible: Yes

Other information
- Station code: PMC

History
- Opened: 1 August 2023; 3 years ago

Passengers
- Sept 2024: ▲4,68,915

Services
Preceding station	Pune Metro	Following station
Chhatrapati Sambhaji Udyan towards Vanaz	Aqua Line	District Court Pune towards Ramwadi
Route map
Location

PMC Bhavan is an elevated metro station on the East-West corridor of the Aqua Line of Pune Metro in Pune, India. The station was opened on 1 August 2023 as an extension of Pune Metro Phase I. Aqua Line operates between Vanaz and Ruby Hall Clinic.

The station is located in front of the Pune Municipal Corporation (PMC) building. Its design is inspired by wadas (house with courtyards) found in peth areas of the city. In September 2023, Maharashtra Metro Rail Corporation Limited (Maha Metro) has proposed to construct a footbridge which will directly connect the PMC building to the station for easy commute of the employees as well as visitors to the former.

== Station layout ==
G	Street level	Exit/Entrance
L1	Mezzanine	Fare control, station agent, Metro Card vending machines, crossover
L2	Side platform | Doors will open on the left
L2	Platform 1 Eastbound	Towards → Ramwadi; Next Station: District Court Change at the next station for Purple Line
L2	Platform 2 Westbound	Towards ← Vanaz; Next Station: Chhatrapati Sambhaji Udyan
L2	Side platform | Doors will open on the left
L3

== See also ==
- Pune
- Maharashtra
- Rapid Transit in India
