= Kalyani Nagar metro station =

Pune Metro's Aqua Line metro station

Kalyani Nagar
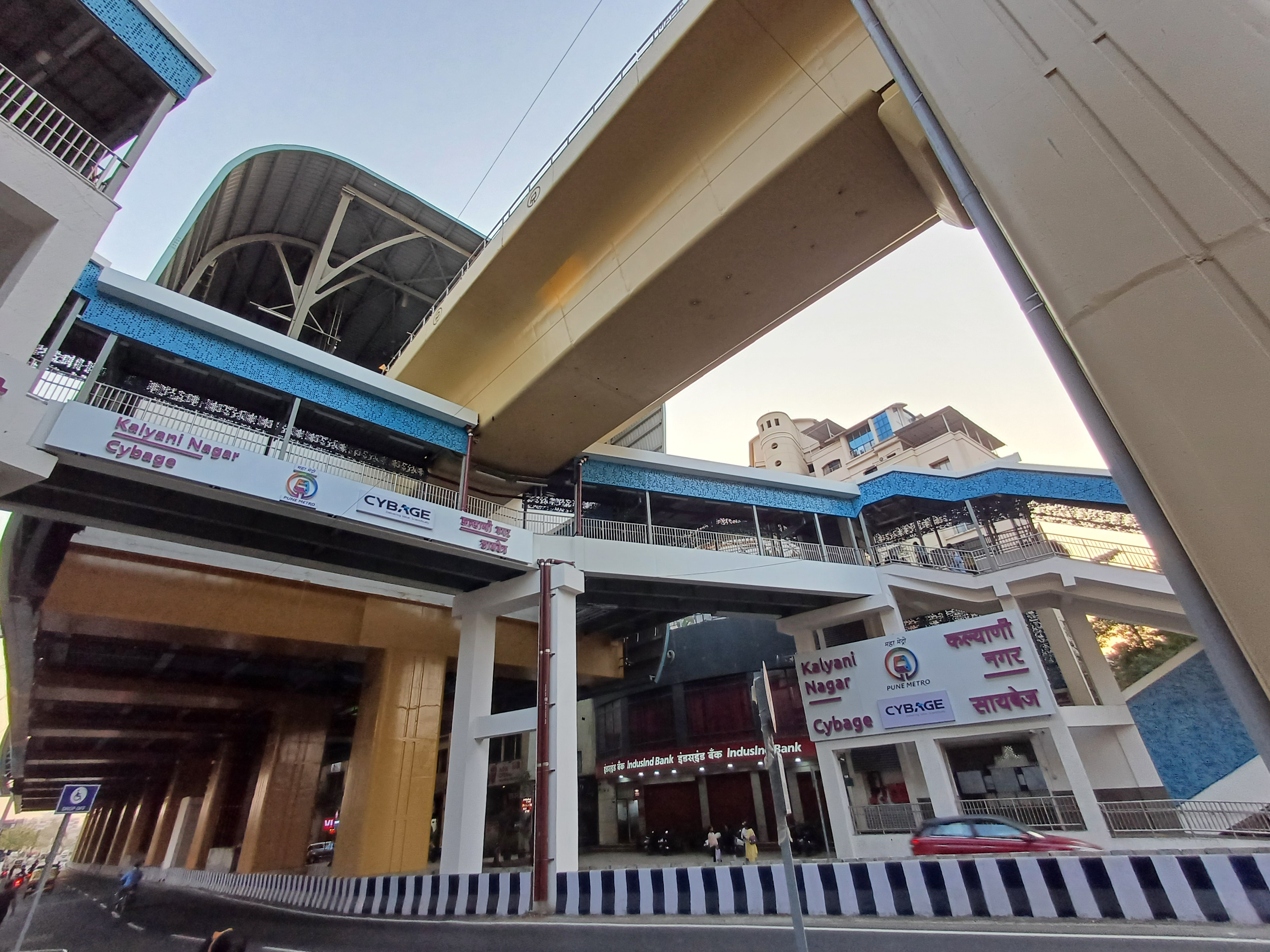

General information
- Location: Kalyani Nagar, Pune, Maharashtra 411006
- Coordinates: 18°32′40″N 73°54′21″E
- System: Pune Metro station
- Owner: Maharashtra Metro Rail Corporation Limited (MAHA-METRO)
- Operator: Pune Metro
- Line: Aqua Line
- Platforms: Side platform Platform-1 → Ramwadi; Platform-2 → Vanaz
- Tracks: 2

Construction
- Structure type: Elevated, Double track
- Platform levels: 2
- Parking: 2 wheeler parking on the South Exit (towards Koregaon Park), 4 wheeler parking at request at the retail store Kalyani Metro Store.
- Cycle facilities: Bicycle parking is available. On demand cycles are not available.
- Accessible: Yes

Other information
- Station code: KNA

History
- Opened: 6 March 2024; 2 years ago
- Electrified: 25 kV 50 Hz AC overhead catenary

Services
Preceding station	Pune Metro	Following station
Yerwada towards Vanaz	Aqua Line	Ramwadi Terminus
Route map
Location

Kalyani Nagar metro station, is the elevated eastern terminal metro station on the East - West corridor of the Aqua Line of Pune Metro in Pune, India. It is connected to Rainbow Bus Rapid Transit System. The station was opened on 6 March 2024 as an extension of Pune Metro Phase I. Aqua Line operates between Vanaz and Ramwadi station. Change over to the Purple Line, PCMC to Swargate stations (North - South corridor) is available at Civil Court station. In June 2024, Entry/Exit Gate no. 3 was opened for the commuters so that they could climb foot over the bridge without crossing the busy road.

== Station layout ==
G	Street level	Exit/Entrance
L1	Mezzanine	Fare control, station agent, Metro Card vending machines, crossover
L2	Side platform | Doors will open on the left
L2	Platform 1 Eastbound	Towards → Ramwadi
L2	Platform 2 Westbound	Towards ← Vanaz; Next Station: Yerwada
L2	Side platform | Doors will open on the left
L3

== See also ==
- Pune
- Maharashtra
- Rapid Transit in India
