= Anand Nagar metro station (Pune) =

Pune Metro's Aqua Line metro station

Anand Nagar
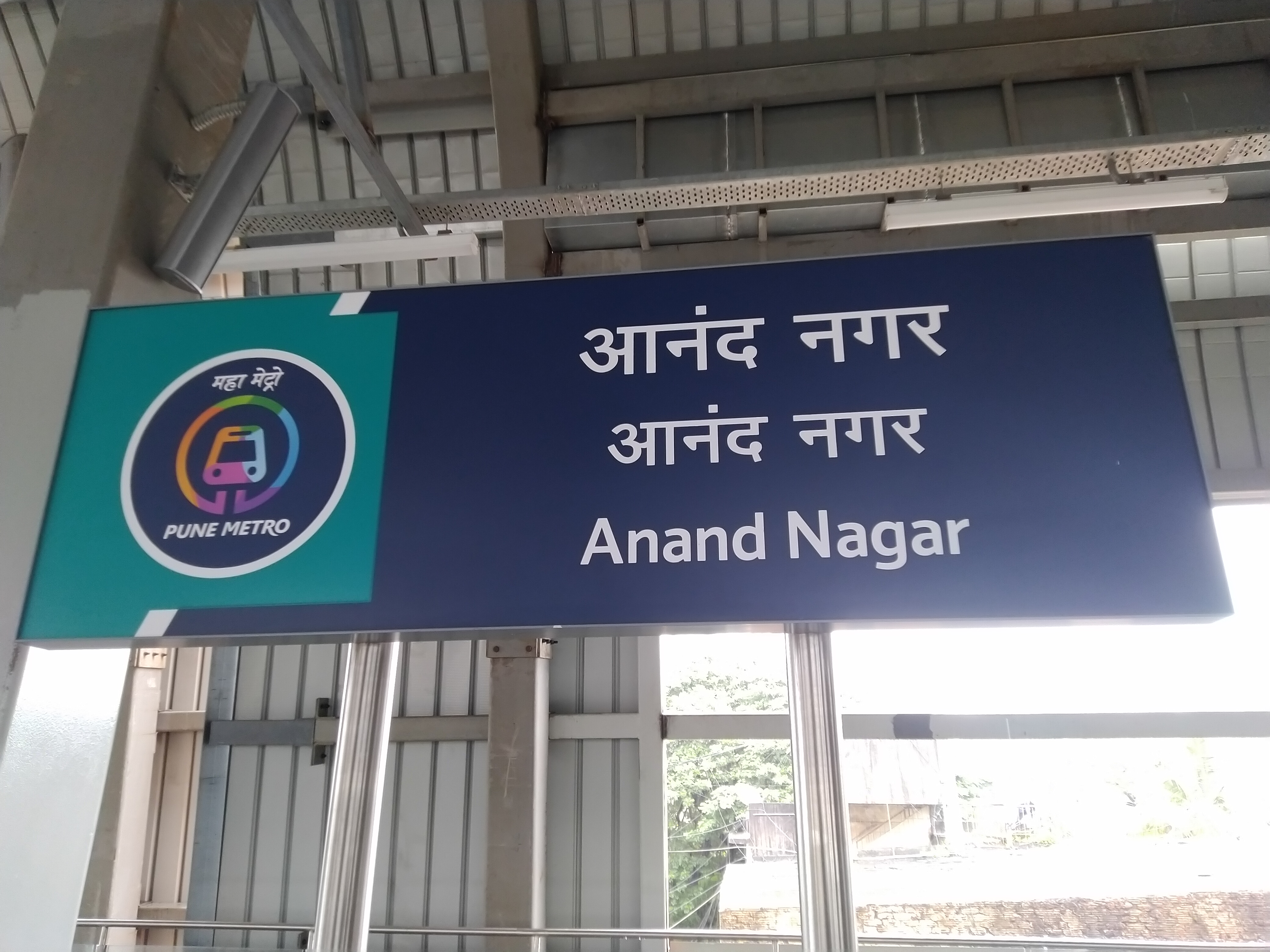

General information
- Location: Rambaug Colony, Kothrud, Pune, Maharashtra 411038
- Coordinates: 18.50963°N 73.81408°E
- System: Pune Metro station
- Owner: Maharashtra Metro Rail Corporation Limited (Maha Metro)
- Operator: Pune Metro
- Line: Aqua Line
- Platforms: Side platform Platform-1 → Ramwadi; Platform-2 → Vanaz
- Tracks: 2

Construction
- Structure type: Elevated, Double track
- Platform levels: 2
- Accessible: Yes

Other information
- Station code: AND

History
- Opened: 6 March 2022; 4 years ago
- Electrified: 25 kV 50 Hz AC overhead catenary

Services
Preceding station	Pune Metro	Following station
Vanaz Terminus	Aqua Line	Paud Phata towards Ramwadi
Route map
Location

Anand Nagar is an elevated metro station on the East-West corridor of the Aqua Line of Pune Metro in Pune, India. The station was opened on 6 March 2022 as an inauguration of Pune Metro and was the first to be completed. From March 2022 to August 2023, the Aqua Line was operational between Vanaz and Garware College. The extended section between Garware College to Ruby Hall Clinic was inaugurated on 1 August 2023. So the metro operated from Vanaz to Ruby Hall Clinic. Later the remaining stretch was completed and the line operates till Ramwadi from 6 March 2024.

== Station layout ==
G	Street level	Exit/Entrance
L1	Mezzanine	Fare control, station agent, Metro Card vending machines, crossover
L2	Side platform | Doors will open on the left
L2	Platform 1 Eastbound	Towards → Ramwadi; Next Station: Ideal Colony
L2	Platform 2 Westbound	Towards ← Vanaz
L2	Side platform | Doors will open on the left
L3

== See also ==
- Pune
- Maharashtra
- Rapid Transit in India
