= Pink Line (Pune Metro) =

Metro line in Pune, India

Pink Line (Line 3)
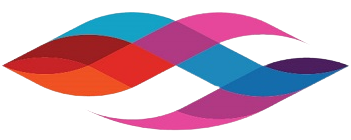

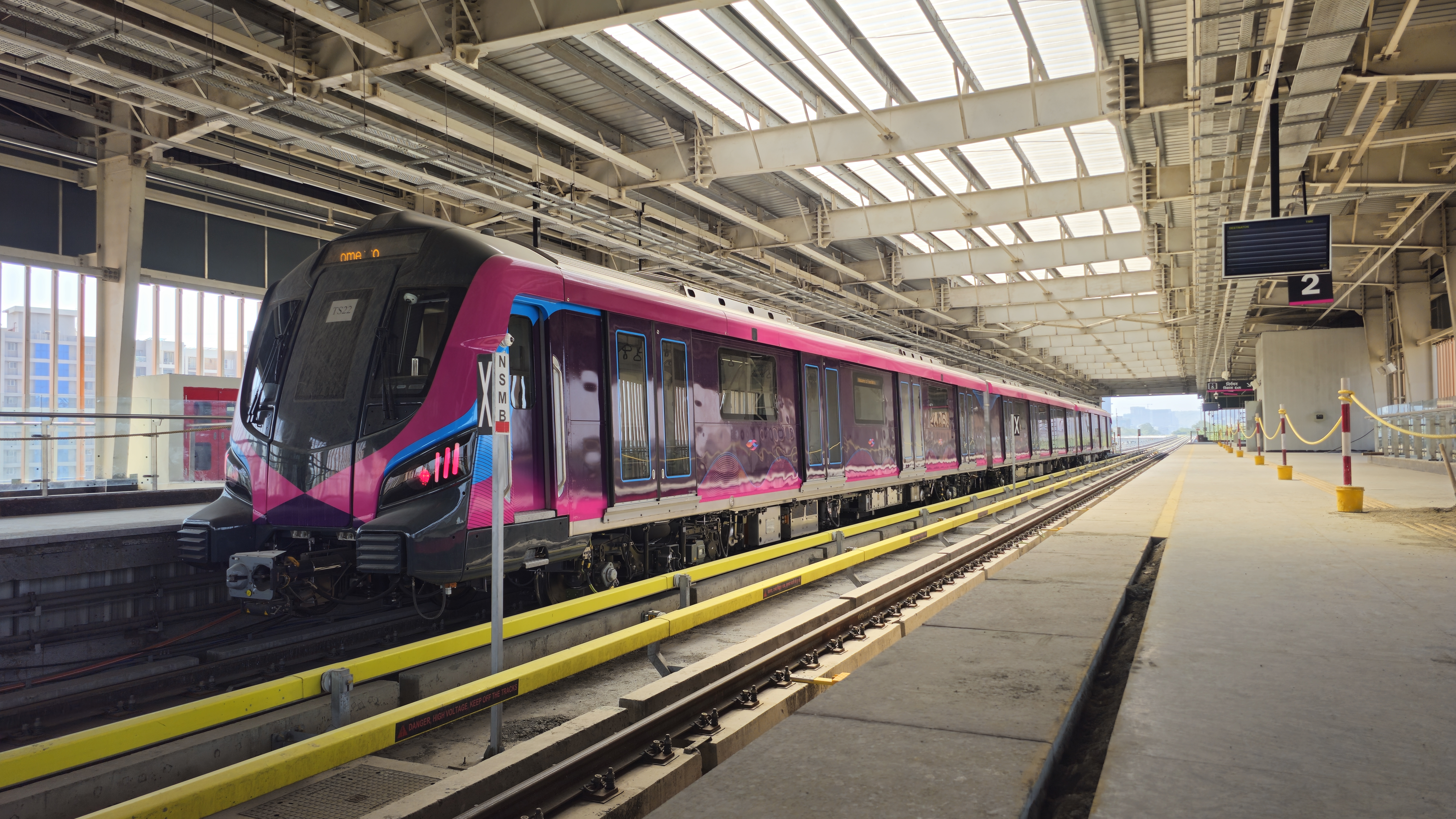
- A Pink Line driverless Alstom Metropolis rake at Hinjawadi Phase-I, captured during testing.

Overview
- Owner: Pune Metropolitan Region Development Authority (PMRDA)
- Line number: 3
- Locale: Pune Metropolitan Region
- Termini: Maan; District Court Pune
- Stations: 17; 6 under construction
- Website: punerimetro.in; www.pmrda.gov.in/en/pune-metro-line-3/

Service
- Type: Rapid Transit
- System: Pune Metro
- Operator: Keolis (under concession from Pune IT City Metro Rail Ltd.)
- Depot(s): Maan, Hinjawadi
- Rolling stock: Alstom Metropolis

History
- Opened: 4 November 2026; 20 days ago

Technical
- Line length: 23.3 km (14.5 mi)
- Num of tracks: 2
- Character: Grade separated, Elevated
- Track gauge: 1,435 mm (4 ft 8 1/2 in) standard gauge
- Electrification: 750V DC Third rail
- Operating speed: 85 km/h (53 mph)
- Signalling: CBTC

The Pink Line (Line 3) of the Pune Metro is the third line of the city of Pune's under-construction mass transit network. It runs from District Court, Pune to Megapolis Pune in Hinjawadi. The 23.3 km (14.5 mi) line is completely elevated and finally has 23 stations and aligns with the Maharashtra Metro Rail Corporation Limited (Maha Metro) lines at the District Court metro station . The construction was be taken up in two phases, the section between Hinjawadi and Balewadi was expected to be taken up first, followed by the section between Balewadi and District Court, Shivajinagar. In the end, the whole line was inaugurated by Prime Minister Modi on 3 November 2026 with commercial start the following day, but 6 stations are still under construction and will be open until March 2027.

A metro car shed was built in Hinjawadi. The MIDC provided 55 acres (22 ha) of land in Hinjawadi for setting up a Metro rail depot. On 3 August 2018, Pune Metropolitan Region Development Authority (PMRDA) announced the final bidder for the project — the joint venture Tata Realty-Siemens. Pune IT City Metro Rail Limited On 3 October 2018, Tata Realty-Siemens were awarded the contract to execute the project on a design, build, finance, operate and transfer model. The formal concession agreement was signed in September 2019 with the construction expected to begin in March 2020. The line was inaugurated on 3 November 2026, with passenger service to start on 4 November.

== Route ==
Pink Line runs from Megapolis Pune in Hinjawadi to District Court, Pune. The 23.3 km (14.5 mi) line is completely elevated and will have 23 stations after full completion. It aligns with the Maharashtra Metro Rail Corporation Limited (Maha Metro) lines at the District Court interchange station. Depot is located at behind the Northeats terminus in Maan village. It spreads across 20 hectares (49 acres).

Interactive map of Pune Metro Pink Line

== Opening ==
The Pink Line's opening was met with a series of constructional and technical issues with the line being delayed multiple times before the virtual inauguration on 3 November and commercial start the next day, while still six stations remain closed due to constructional delays.

== List of stations ==
Following is a list of stations on this route:

Pink Line
#	Station Name		Opening	Connections
#	English	Marathi	Opening	Connections
1	Maan	माण	4 November 2026	
2	Maan - MIDC Circle Phase-II	माण - एमआयडीसी सर्कल फेज-II	4 November 2026	
3	Maan Bus Depot	माण बस डेपो	4 November 2026	
4	Hinjawadi Phase-II Circle-II	हिंजवडी फेज-II सर्कल-II	4 November 2026	
5	Hinjawadi Phase-II Circle-I	हिंजवडी फेज-II सर्कल-I	4 November 2026	
6	Padmabhushan Chowk	पद्मभूषण चौक	4 November 2026	
7	Shree Shiv Chhatrapati Shivaji Maharaj Chowk Hinjawadi	श्री शिवछत्रपती शिवाजी महाराज चौक हिंजवडी	4 November 2026	
8	Hinjawadi Phase-I	हिंजवडी फेज-I	4 November 2026	
9	Wakad Chowk	वाकड चौक	4 November 2026	
10	Shree Shiv Chhatrapati Sports Complex Mahalunge	श्री शिवछत्रपती क्रीडा संकुल महाळुंगे	4 November 2026	
11	Mitcon Balewadi	मिटकॉन बालेवाडी	4 November 2026	
12	R K Laxman Museum Balewadi	आर.के. लक्ष्मण संग्रहालय बालेवाडी	4 November 2026	
13	Balewadi High Street	बालेवाडी हाय स्ट्रीट	2027	
14	Balewadi Phata	बालेवाडी फाटा	Dec 2026	
15	Baner Gaon	बाणेर गाव	Dec 2026	
16	Baner Pashan Link Road	बाणेर पाषाण जोडरस्ता	2027	
17	Aundh	औंध	4 November 2026	
18	Sakal Nagar	सकाळ नगर	4 November 2026	
19	Savitribai Phule Pune University	सावित्रीबाई फुले पुणे विद्यापीठ	4 November 2026	
20	Bhosalenagar - RBI	भोसलेनगर - आरबीआय	2027	
21	Agriculture College	कृषी महाविद्यालय	4 November 2026	
22	Shivaji Nagar	शिवाजी नगर	Dec 2026	Purple Line
23	District Court Pune	जिल्हा न्यायालय पुणे	4 November 2026	Purple Line; Aqua Line

== Construction ==
The contract for conducting geotechnical investigation was awarded to Soiltech India Private Limited. Geotechnical investigation commenced on 19 June 2019. However, due to the COVID-19 pandemic and the subsequent nationwide lockdown, work on several projects had been delayed, including Pink Line. Following a gap of nearly 11 months, piling works resumed at multiple locations near Hinjawadi in May 2020.

Pune Metro Line 3 has achieved a significant milestone with the Commissioner of Metro Rail Safety (CMRS) for the commencement of passenger operations on the first phase of the project, covering the 12-station section between Maan Metro Station and R.K. Laxman Museum (Balewadi) Metro Station. The approval follows the successful completion of all statutory inspections, safety validations, confirmatory trial runs and mandatory compliance requirements, paving the way for the commencement of commercial passenger services on the first stretch of the corridor. The 23.3-kilometre (14.5 mi) metro line connecting Hinjawadi IT Park with Shivajinagar will be operationalised in two phases, with the Maan–R.K. Laxman Museum section opening first, followed by the remaining stretch up to Shivajinagar.

Pune Metro Line 3 receives CMRS approval for Phase 1 operations of the 23.3 km (14.5 mi) stretch. The total project cost for the line was ₹8,313 crore (US$890 million).

== Extension ==
PMRDA proposed an extension of Pink Line from District Court station towards Hadapsar. In-principle approval for DPR was given by the then CM and PMRDA head Devendra Fadnavis in December 2018. DPR for extension is being prepared by Delhi Metro Rail Corporation under supervision of PMRDA. As per draft DPR submitted by PMRDA, proposed stations for extension will be Railway Colony, Collector's Office, MG Road, Fashion Street, Mhammadevi Chowk, Race Course, Kaluba Chowk, Vaiduwadi, Hadapsar Phata, Hadapsar Gadital bus stand, Civil Aviation Ground, Phursungi IT Park and Sulabh Garden.

In December 2020, DMRC announced bid to conduct geotechnical investigation works for DPR preparation for Hadapsar-Loni Kalbhor extension. The second extension is expected to increase line 3's length by 8.5 km (5.3 mi) with 4-5 new stations at various locations.
