= State Highway 27 (Maharashtra) =

Road in Maharashtra, India

State Highway 27

Major junctions
- Southwest end: Pune, Pune District
- Northeast end: Ahmednagar, Ahmednagar District

Location
- Country: India
- State: Maharashtra
- Districts: Ahmednagar, Pune

Highway system
- Roads in India; Expressways; National; State; Asian; State Highways in Maharashtra

State Highway 27 is a state highway from Pune to Ahmednagar in the state of Maharashtra. The highway is the major link between the two cities. Since trains take about 4 hours to cover this distance, people prefer travelling by this highway, by which one can reach Ahmednagar within 2 hours.

== Route ==
The highway connects Pune to Wagholi, Shikrapur, Ranjangaon, Shirur, Supa, Kedgaon and Ahmednagar.

== Wagholi-Shikrapur flyover ==
This is a proposed bridge of 25 kilometres (16 mi) on this highway. This bridge would be four lanes and would have height of 17 feet (5.2 m). This would cost ₹ 2500 crores. This is expected to have 1000 pillars.
