= Pune Monorail =

Proposed monorail in India

Overview
- Owner: N/A
- Locale: Pune, Maharashtra
- Transit type: straddle-beam Monorail
- Number of lines: 2 (planned)
- Number of stations: 18 (planned)
- Daily ridership: 71,557 (Estd.)
- Chief executive: N/A
- Headquarters: N/A

Operation
- Began operation: N/A
- Operator: N/A
- Number of vehicles: 15
- Train length: N/A
- Headway: 3 minutes

Technical
- System length: 52 km
- Track gauge: N/A
- Electrification: 750 V DC
- Average speed: 30 km/h (19 mph)
- Top speed: 80 km/h (50 mph)

Pune Monorail refers to several proposed monorail system for the city of Pune, India. As of 2024, none have come to fruition, with the Pune Metro opening in 2022 instead.

== Background ==
The Pune Municipal Corporation decided to construct a monorail system to reduce road congestion and the number of private vehicles along the route. The monorail will be taken up by the Pune Municipal Corporation.

== Network ==
There are 3 lines proposed to be built:

=== Ring Road line ===
The first monorail line will run along the proposed High Capacity Mass Transit Route (HCMTR) project. Length of this corridor will be 30 km

=== Warje-Kharadi line ===
Warje to Kharadi, 22 km long route.

=== Thorat Udyan monorail ===
In 2024, a monorail was proposed for the Thorat Udyan park in Kothrud, Pune. The project was suspended in 2024 before construction started.

== See also ==
- Pune Metro
