= Maan metro station =

Maan

General information
- Location: Metro station, Maan Rd, near Megapolis Circle, Phase 3, Rajiv Gandhi Infotech Park, Hinjawadi, Pimpri Chinchwad, Maharashtra 411057, India; India
- System: Pune Metro
- Line: Pink Line

History
- Opened: 4 November 2026

Maan is an elevated metro station in Pune served by the Pune Metro. It is the terminus of the Pink Line. The station opened on 4 November 2026.
