= Rainbow Bus Rapid Transit System =

Bus Rapid transit system connecting Pune and Pimpri-Chinchwad

Rainbow BRTS
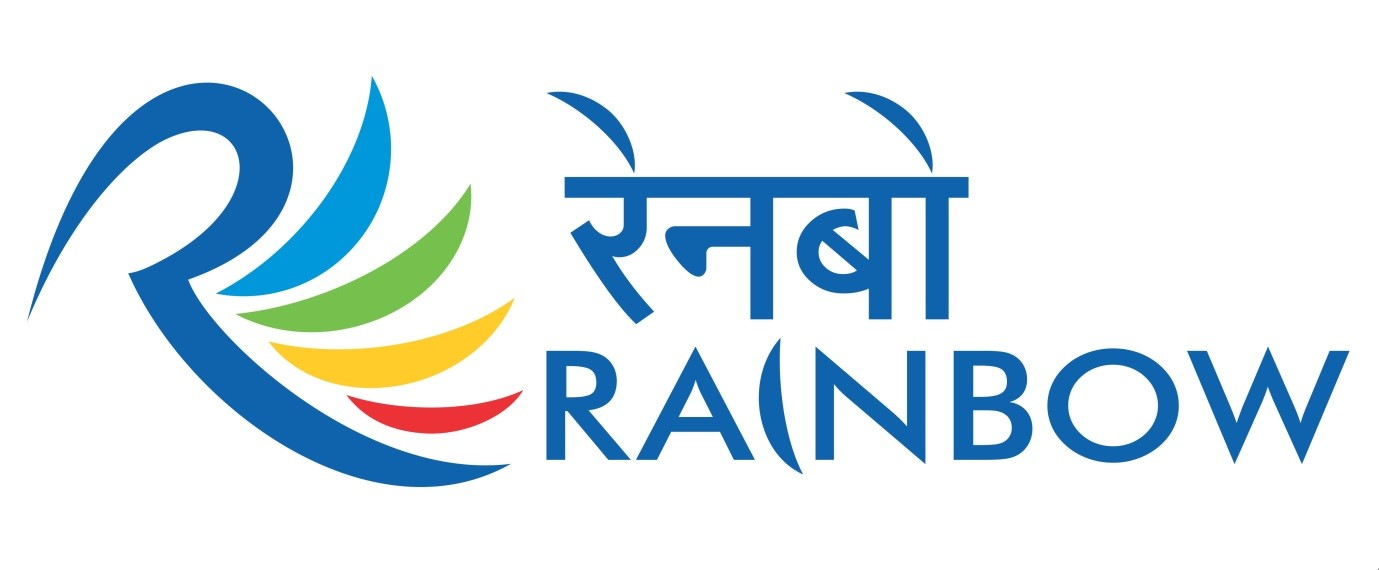

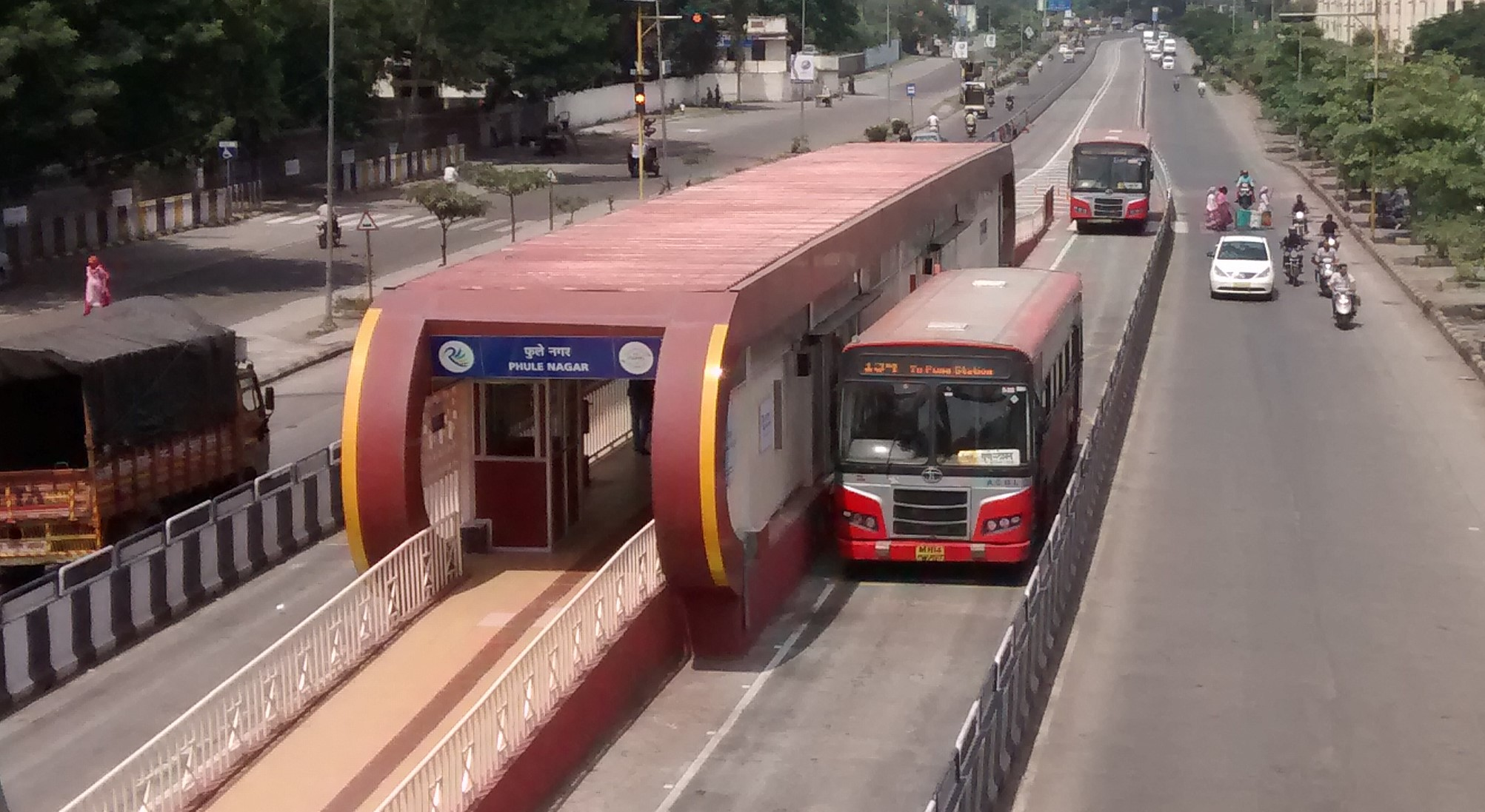
- Rainbow BRTS stop - Phule Nagar

Overview
- Owner: PMPML
- Locale: Pune, India
- Transit type: Bus rapid transit
- Number of lines: 6
- Number of stations: 102
- Website: rainbowbrt.in

Operation
- Began operation: 2006

Technical
- System length: 61 km (38 mi); 114 km (71 mi) (proposed)
System map
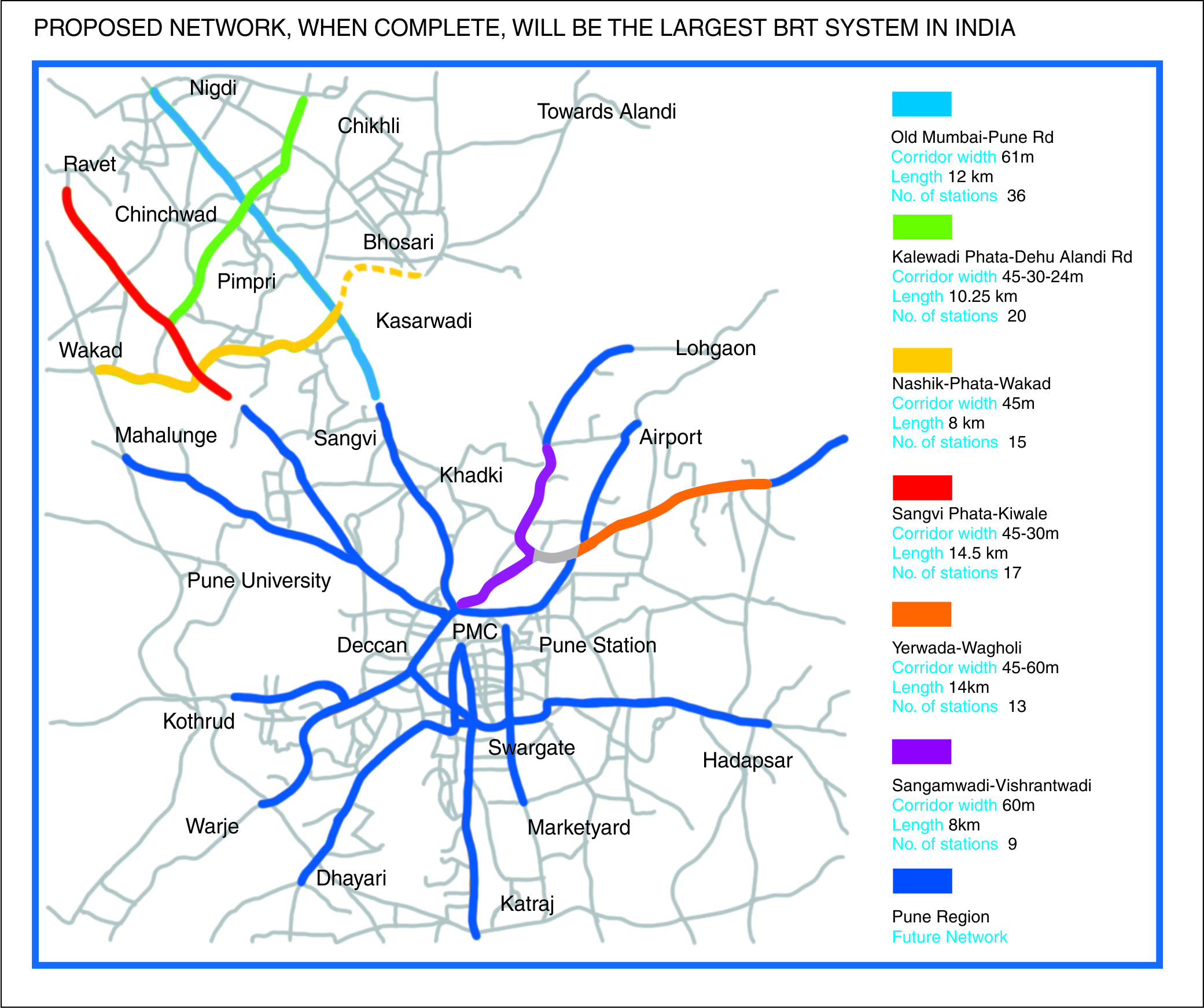

Rainbow BRTS is a bus rapid transit system in the city of Pune. The system is operated by the Pune Mahanagar Parivahan Mahamandal Limited (PMPML). The infrastructure has been developed by the Pune Municipal Corporation & Pimpri Chinchwad Municipal Corporation, Pune. The project currently envisages 113 km of dedicated bus corridors along with buses, bus stations, terminals and intelligent transit management system.

The Rainbow BRTS project is being implemented with the financial support of Jawaharlal Nehru National Urban Renewal Mission (JnNURM) of the Government of India. Additionally, specific components of the project in PCMC limits are being funded under the ‘Sustainable Urban Transport Project’, which is an initiative of the Ministry of Urban Development, Government of India and is supported by The World Bank, UNDP and GEF.

== History ==
Pune was the second city in India to experiment with a bus rapid transit system, after Ahmedabad, which opened the nation's first BRT in 2010. PMPML started plying pilot routes in December 2006.

The Hadapsar-Katraj pilot project consisted of 16.5 kilometres (10.3 mi) of bus lanes along the Pune Satara Road using more than 500 air-conditioned, low-floor Volvo B7RLE buses initially on Katraj - Swargate - Hadapsar. Most of these buses are not in service currently. The funding for the project came from the Government of India under the Jawaharlal Nehru National Urban Renewal Mission. Total of 112 kilometres (70 mi) route was proposed for Rainbow BRTS. Now regular PMPML buses ply on the Hadapsar-Katraj corridor of BRTS.

The Pimpri-Chinchwad BRTS was announced in December 2008, when eight routes covering 112 km were proposed. Construction of the first route was due to be completed within 18 months. By January 2009, 90% of construction work on an 11 km pilot route between Nigdi and Dapodi had been completed. However, a string of disputes between the Pimpri-Chinchwad Municipal Corporation (PCMC), civic administrators and corporators led to the project being delayed, with corporators citing funding difficulties and problems encountered on the similar Delhi BRTS and Rainbow BRTS projects as the causes.

In September 2009 difficulties procuring the 650 buses required to run on the system led to the project being indefinitely postponed. The new bus shelters were sited on the wrong side of the road, leading to delays in their construction, while passenger information systems had yet to be installed. A month later it was revealed that the cost of the project had overrun by 230 crore, around 50% of the total project cost. By May 2010, funding for the completion of four BRT routes had been agreed, with the remaining four sanctioned by the national government but not yet funded. A number of high-rise buildings along the routes had also been approved for construction.

Both the systems were merged to form Rainbow BRTS.

By April 2014 two of the routes were under construction, with the first station near to completion. The first two lines were expected to be operational by the end of March or the beginning of April 2015. The Sangvi-Kiwale corridor (earlier named as Aundh-Ravet corridor) was thrown open to public on 5 September 2015.

== Description ==
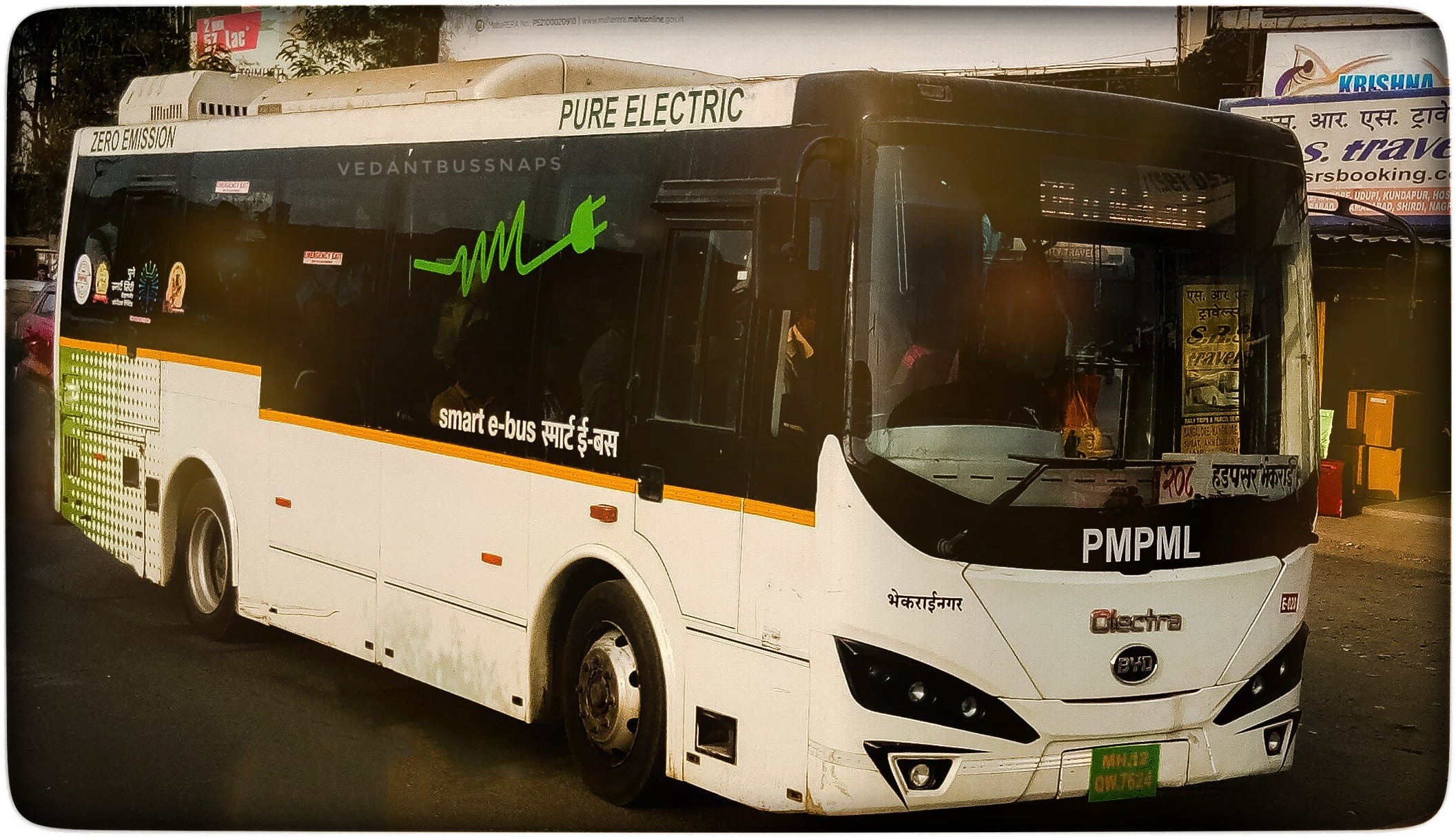
Rainbow BRTS was the first bus rapid system in India.

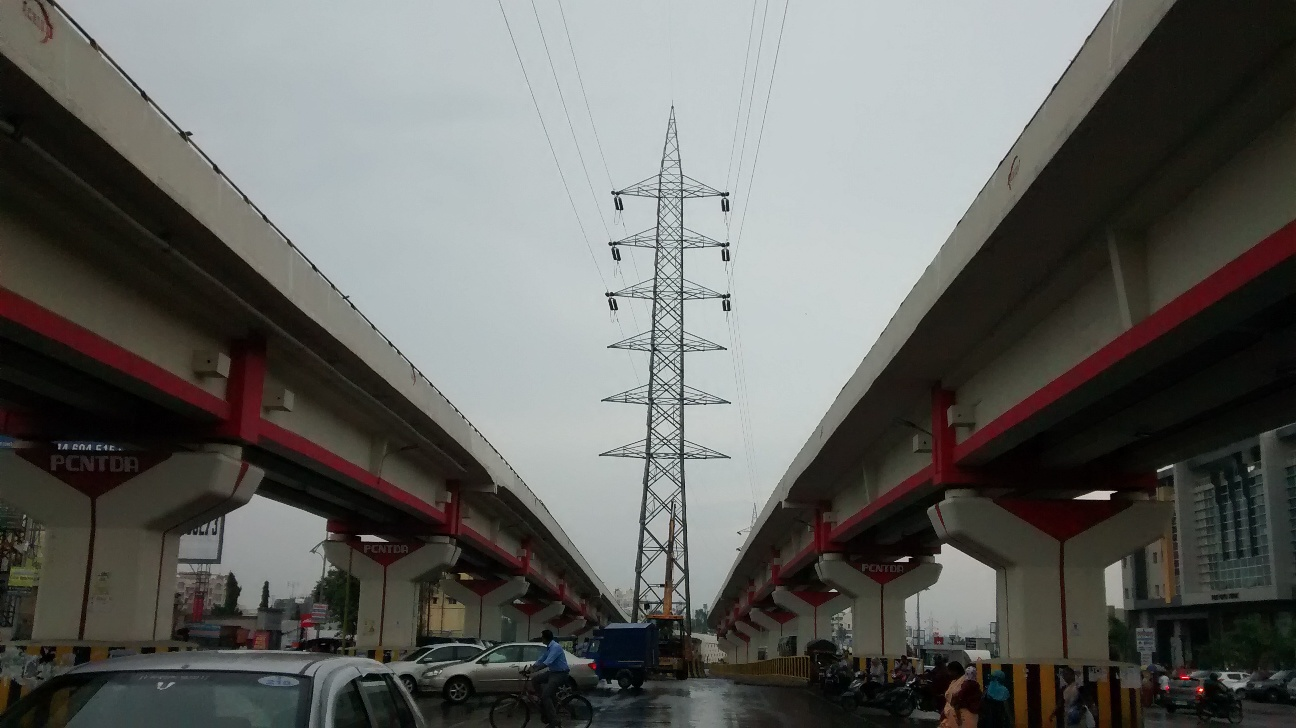
The Kalewadi Phata flyover was built by the PPCNTDA as part of the BRTS.

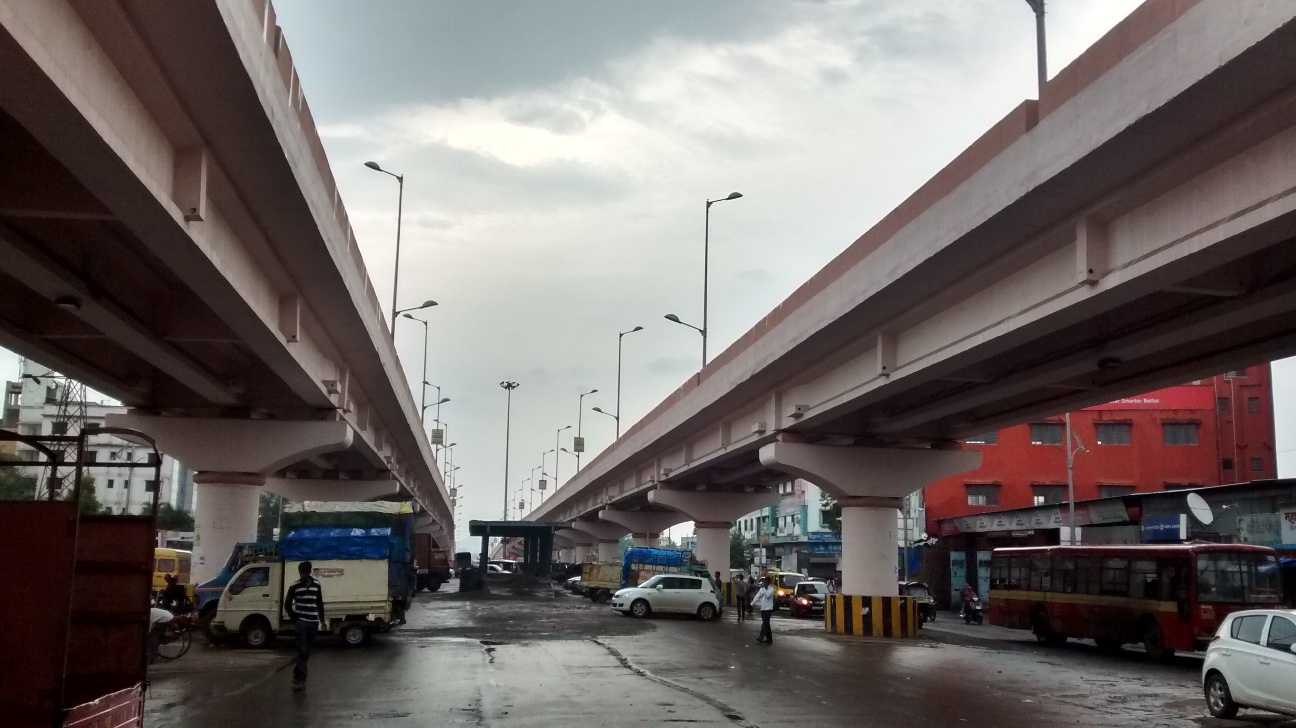
The Dange Chowk flyover was built by the PCMC as part of the BRTS project.

Feeder bus routes or regular services are run by PMPML from various locations in the city up to the BRT corridors.

The system will when completed comprise eight routes with a total length of 112 km, with improved street lighting and passenger facilities on the roads used by the system. It will require around 650 buses to operate the complete network. The system will be substantially different from that in neighbouring Pune, with wider roads and grade separation allowing a more substantial network to be constructed.

The buses and bus stops alike are integrated via the Integrated Traffic Management System (ITMS), which enables travellers to know the ETA of the bus. The bus stops and the buses are equipped with automatic doors that open when they are in close proximity. The bus stops are easily accessible by a low-gradient ramp on one end. Signals are being installed near the bus stops to enable pedestrians to cross the road.

== Routes ==
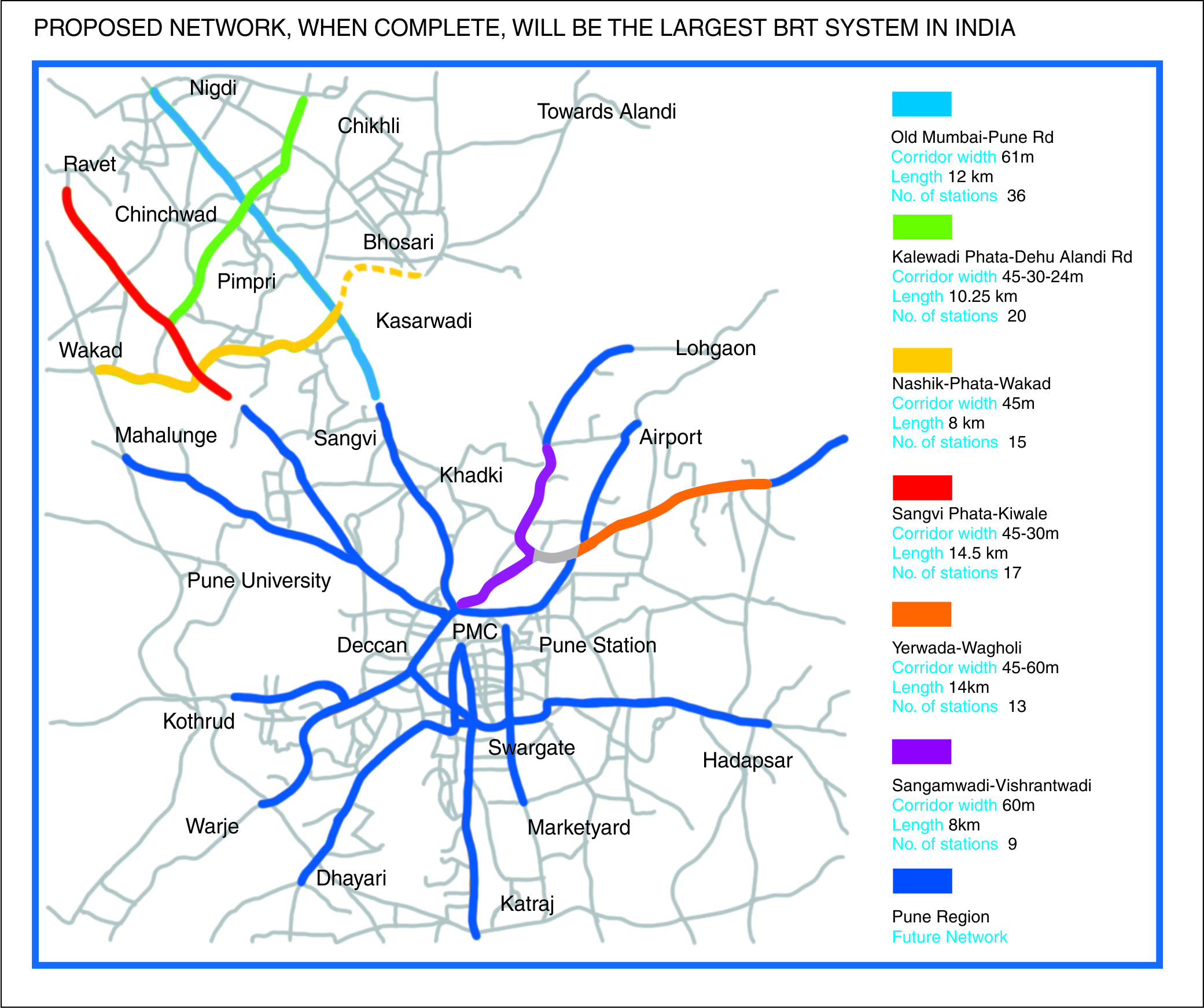
BRTS corridor map

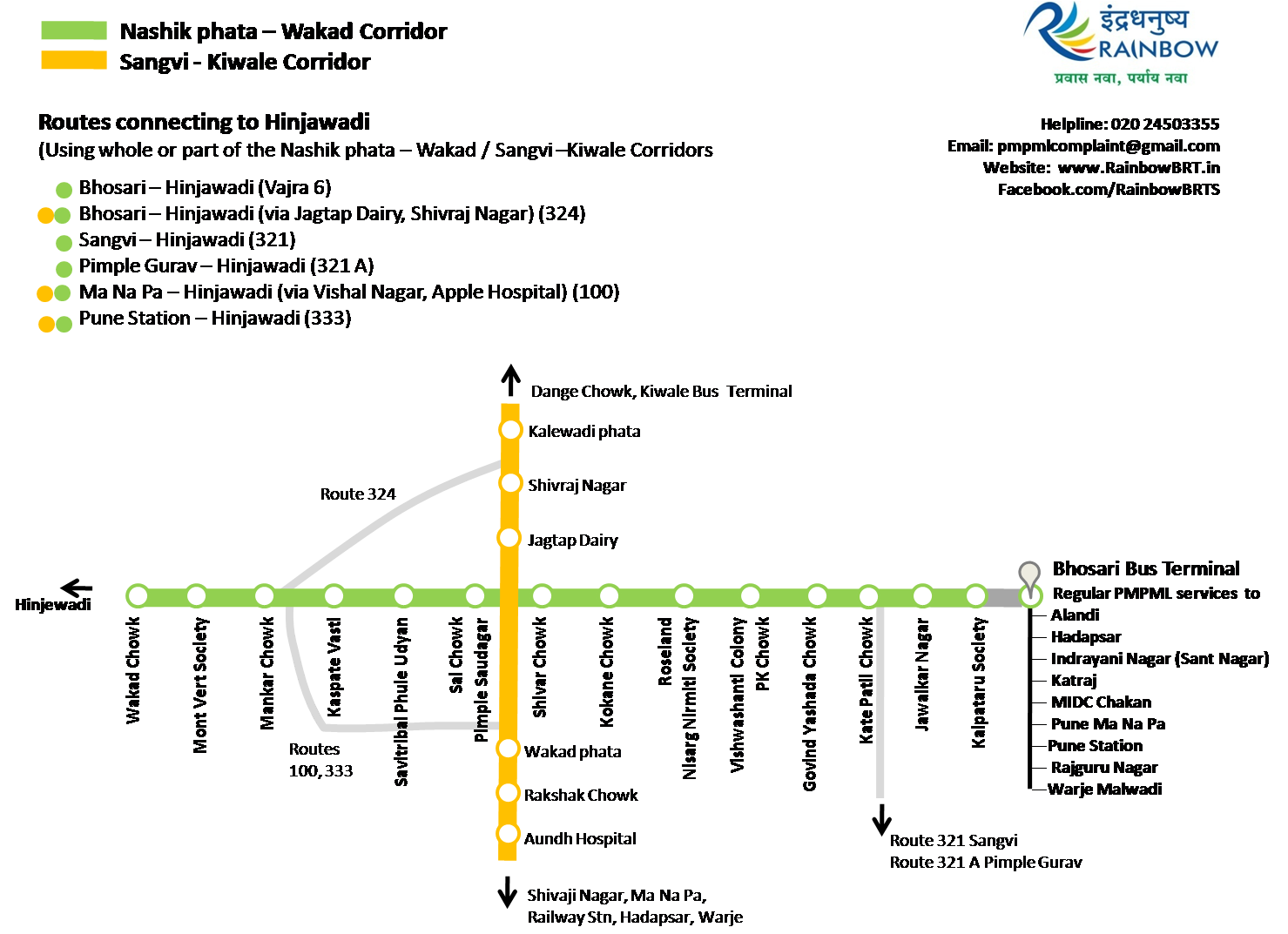
BRTS Nashik Phata-Wakad Corridor

=== Phase 1 (2006) ===
A pilot system was constructed on the Katraj - Swargate - Hadapsar corridor and operations began in December 2006. At a time when 'BRT' acronym was new to India and there was limited nationwide understanding of requirements for such an advanced public transport system, Pune was the first city in India to implement and operationalise a high capacity bus system on two corridors:

- Swargate–Hadapsar (East‐West Corridor) – 10.2 km
- Swargate–Katraj (North‐South Corridor) – 5.8 km

The infrastructure and operations was an improvement over the regular bus services while many features which are intrinsic to a bus rapid transit system were not a part of it. The infrastructure components included widening of roads, construction of footpaths and cycle tracks, laying of municipal services like water supply and drainage lines, utility ducts, construction of BRT lane‐segregators, bus stops, installation of Passenger Information System, etc. The Ministry of Urban Development, Government of India provided financial support for the project.

However, with the construction of three flyovers along the route, the pilot corridor has now been interrupted at various points and the use of the dedicated lane discontinued.

=== Phase 2 (2016) ===
Six corridors are being developed in the current phase of the Rainbow BRTS network.

Corridor name	Length (km)	Number of stations	Region	Status
Yerawada - Wagholi	8	13	Pune	Oprerational from April 2016
Sangamwadi - Vishrantwadi	8	9	Pune	Operational from August 2015
Nigdi - Dapodi	12	18	Pimpri Chinchwad	Operational from August 2018
Aundh - Ravet	14	17	Pimpri Chinchwad	Operational from September 2015
Nashik Phata - Wakad	8	15	Pimpri Chinchwad	Operational from November 2015
Kalewadi Phata - Dehu Alandi Road	11	20	Pimpri Chinchwad	Operational from September 2019

== Repair work ==
In 2012, the PMC started to make changes on the road so that the management of traffic would become easier. A 1.5 km long flyover was constructed from Padmavati to Bhartividyapeeth, which has four lanes, plus the existing four lanes. The legs of the flyover are constructed on the BRTS route. The BRTS has been cancelled. Apart from the flyover, there are two subways constructed at Bibwewadi chowk and Kaka Halwai chowk for the pedestrians to cross. These three constructions have reduced a lot of time to travel through this route.

== See also ==
- Pune Monorail
- Pune Metro
- Pune Metropolitan Area
- Pune Railway Station
- Lohegaon Airfield

== Sources ==
- Map_Corridors.pdf
- RainbowBrtPune
