= Ruby Hall Clinic metro station =

Pune Metro's Aqua Line metro station

Ruby Hall Clinic
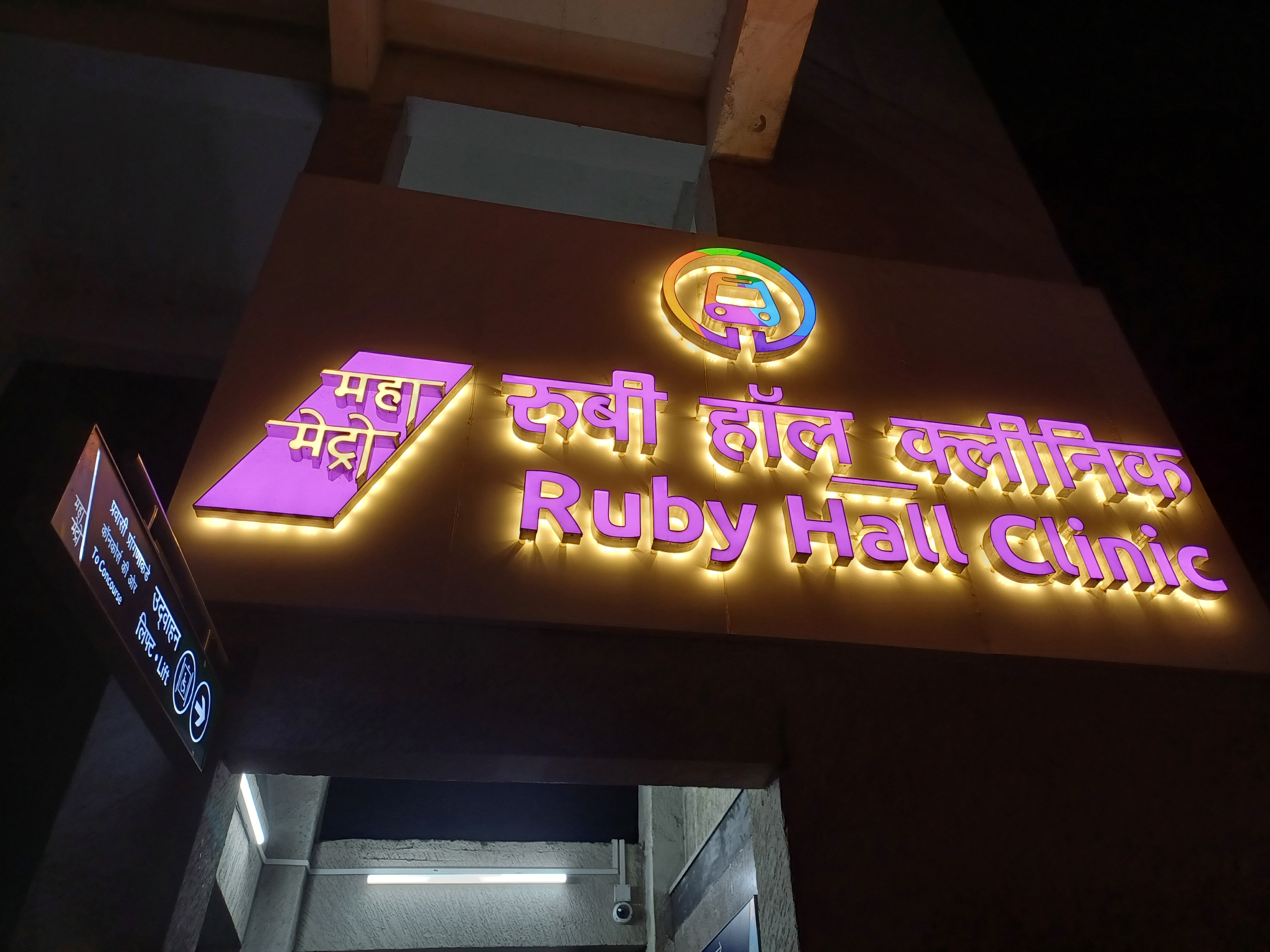

General information
- Location: Sangamvadi, Pune, Maharashtra 411001
- Coordinates: 18°31′57″N 73°52′40″E
- System: Pune Metro station
- Owner: Maharashtra Metro Rail Corporation Limited (MAHA-METRO)
- Operator: Pune Metro
- Line: Aqua Line
- Platforms: Side platform Platform-1 → Ramwadi; Platform-2 → Vanaz
- Tracks: 2

Construction
- Structure type: Elevated, Double track
- Platform levels: 2
- Accessible: Yes

Other information
- Station code: RUC

History
- Opened: 1 August 2023; 3 years ago
- Electrified: 25 kV 50 Hz AC overhead catenary

Services
Preceding station	Pune Metro	Following station
Pune Railway Station towards Vanaz	Aqua Line	Bund Garden towards Ramwadi
Route map
Location

Ruby Hall Clinic is the elevated eastern terminal metro station on the East - West corridor of the Aqua Line of Pune Metro in Pune, India. The station was opened on 1 August 2023 as an extension of Pune Metro Phase I. Aqua Line operates between Vanaz and Ramwadi.

== Station layout ==
G	Street level	Exit/Entrance
L1	Mezzanine	Fare control, station agent, Metro Card vending machines, crossover
L2	Side platform | Doors will open on the left
L2	Platform 1 Eastbound	Towards → Ramwadi; Next Station: Bund Garden
L2	Platform 2 Westbound	Towards ← Vanaz; Next Station: Pune Railway Station
L2	Side platform | Doors will open on the left
L3

== See also ==
- Pune
- Maharashtra
- Rapid Transit in India
