= Ramwadi metro station =

Pune Metro's Aqua Line terminal metro station

Ramwadi
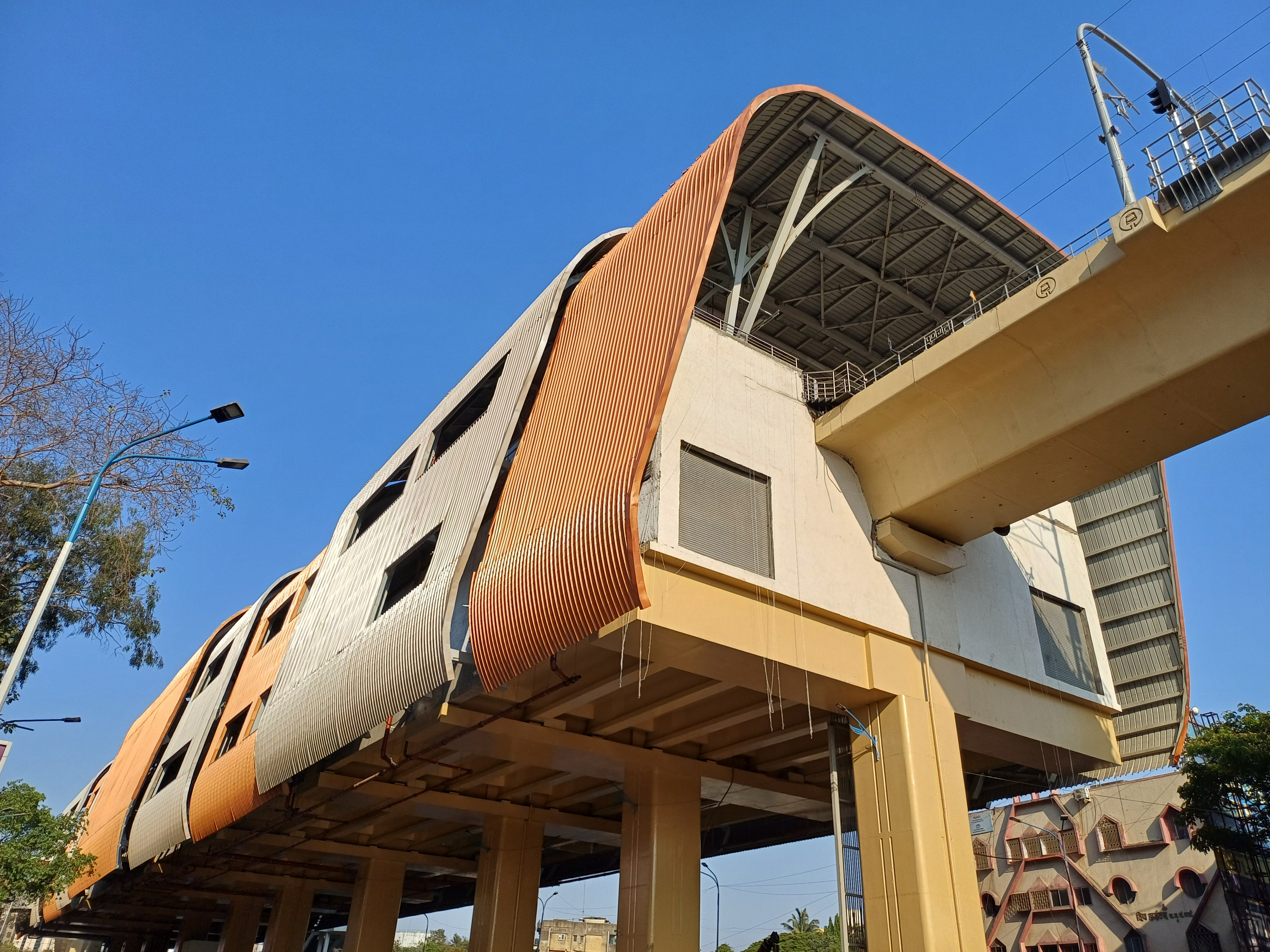

General information
- Location: Viman Nagar, Pune, Maharashtra 411014
- Coordinates: 18°33′26″N 73°54′35″E
- System: Pune Metro station
- Owner: Maharashtra Metro Rail Corporation Limited (MAHA-METRO)
- Operator: Pune Metro
- Line: Aqua Line
- Platforms: Side platform Platform-1 → Train Terminates Here; Platform-2 → Vanaz
- Tracks: 2

Construction
- Structure type: Elevated, Double track
- Platform levels: 2
- Accessible: Yes

Other information
- Station code: RAW

History
- Opened: 6 March 2024; 2 years ago

Passengers
- Sept 2024: ▲3,99,779

Services
Preceding station	Pune Metro	Following station
Kalyani Nagar towards Vanaz	Aqua Line	Terminus
Route map
Location

Ramwadi is the elevated eastern terminal metro station on the East - West corridor of the Aqua Line of Pune Metro in Pune, India. It is connected to Rainbow Bus Rapid Transit System. The station was opened on 6 March 2024 as an extension of Pune Metro Phase I. Aqua Line operates between Vanaz and Ramwadi stations.

Along with the opening of this station, the Pune Mahanagar Parivahan Mahamandal Limited had inaugurated AC bus feeder service from Ramwadi to Pune Airport. The bus no. 19 ran on two routes at an interval of 25 minutes, the fare for which was ₹5 to ₹10 depending upon the distance. However, the operations of this shuttle bus were shifted to Yerwada metro station, after the latter was inaugurated on 21 August 2024. Another AC bus feeder service connecting Ramwadi to Kharadi was launched in June 2024. This bus travels a distance of 7km and runs at an interval of 30 minutes, covering around 20 stops on the route.

== Station layout ==
G	Street level	Exit/Entrance
L1	Mezzanine	Fare control, station agent, Metro Card vending machines, crossover
L2	Side platform | Doors will open on the left
L2	Platform 1 Eastbound	Towards → Train Terminates Here
L2	Platform 2 Westbound	Towards ← Vanaz; Next Station: Kalyani Nagar
L2	Side platform | Doors will open on the left
L3

== See also ==
- Pune
- Maharashtra
- Rapid Transit in India
