= Vanaz metro station =

Pune Metro's Aqua Line terminal metro station

Vanaz
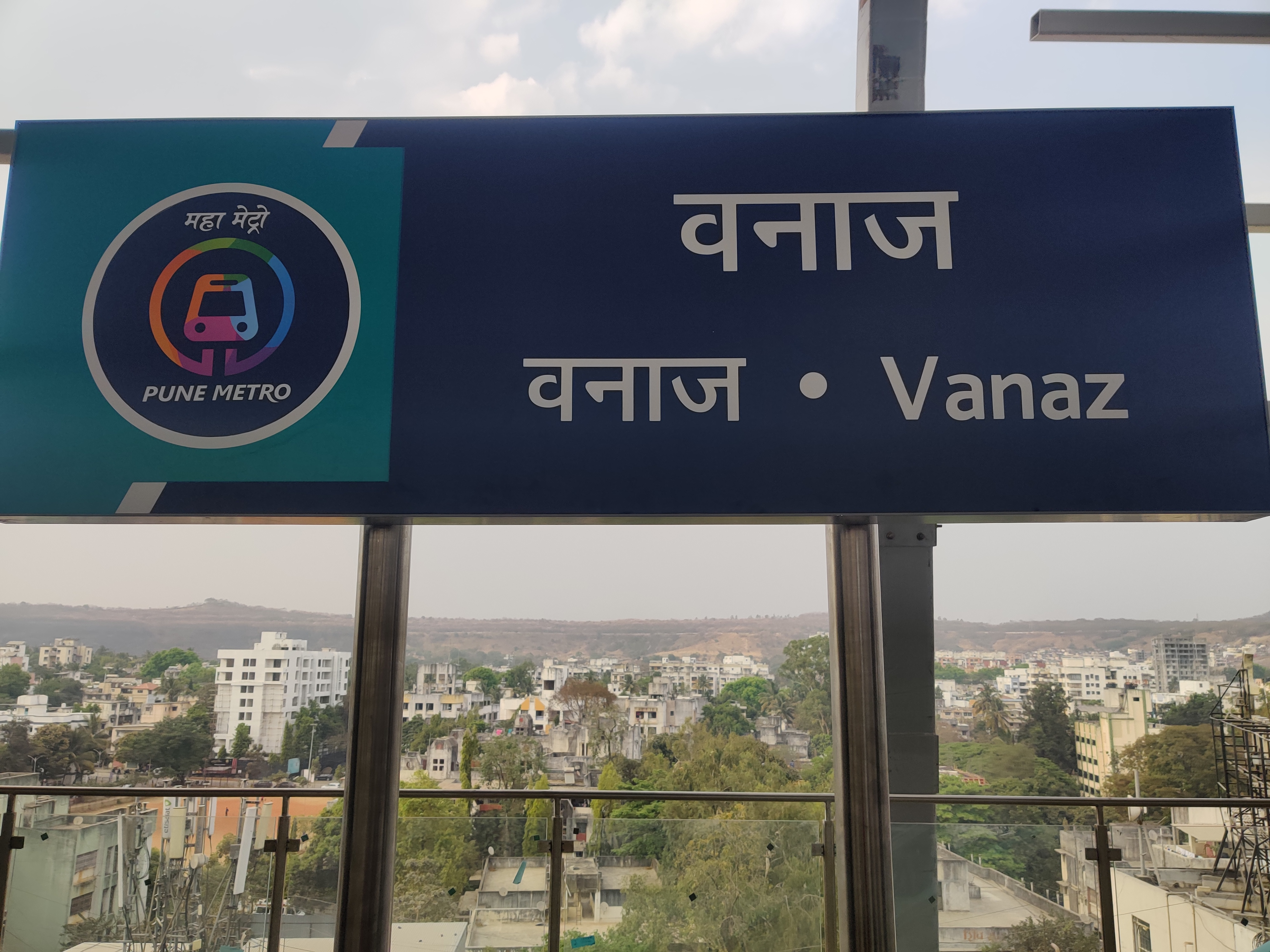

General information
- Location: Alkapuri Society, Kothrud, Pune, Maharashtra 411038
- Coordinates: 18°30′26″N 73°48′19″E
- System: Pune Metro station
- Owner: Maharashtra Metro Rail Corporation Limited (MAHA-METRO)
- Operator: Pune Metro
- Line: Aqua Line
- Platforms: 2 Side platform
- Tracks: 2

Construction
- Structure type: Elevated, Double track
- Accessible: Yes

Other information
- Station code: VNZ

History
- Opened: 6 March 2022; 4 years ago

Passengers
- Sept 2024: ▲2,79,044

Services
Preceding station	Pune Metro	Following station
Terminus	Aqua Line	Anand Nagar towards Ramwadi
Route map
Location

Vanaz is the elevated western terminal metro station on the East-West corridor of the Aqua Line of Pune Metro in Pune, India. The station was opened on 6 March 2022 as an inauguration of Pune Metro. From March 2022 to August 2023, the Aqua Line was operational between Vanaz and Garware College. The extended section between Garware College to Ruby Hall Clinic was inaugurated on 1 August 2023. So the metro operated from Vanaz to Ruby Hall Clinic. Later the remaining stretch was completed and the line operates till Ramwadi from 6 March 2024.

It is the only station to have 3 levels, two concourses and one platform level. The lower concourse is unfinished and will be opened afterwards.

== Station layout ==
G	Street level	Exit/Entrance
L1	Mezzanine	Fare control, station agent, Metro Card vending machines, crossover
L2	Side platform | Doors will open on the left
L2	Platform 1 Eastbound	Towards → Ramwadi; Next Station: Anand Nagar
L2	Platform 2 Westbound	Towards ← Train Terminates Here
L2	Side platform | Doors will open on the left
L3

The track beyond the station leads to Vanaz Depot and the DPR for a planned extension to Chandani Chowk is underway.

== See also ==
- Pune
- Maharashtra
- Rapid Transit in India
