= List of educational institutions in Pune =

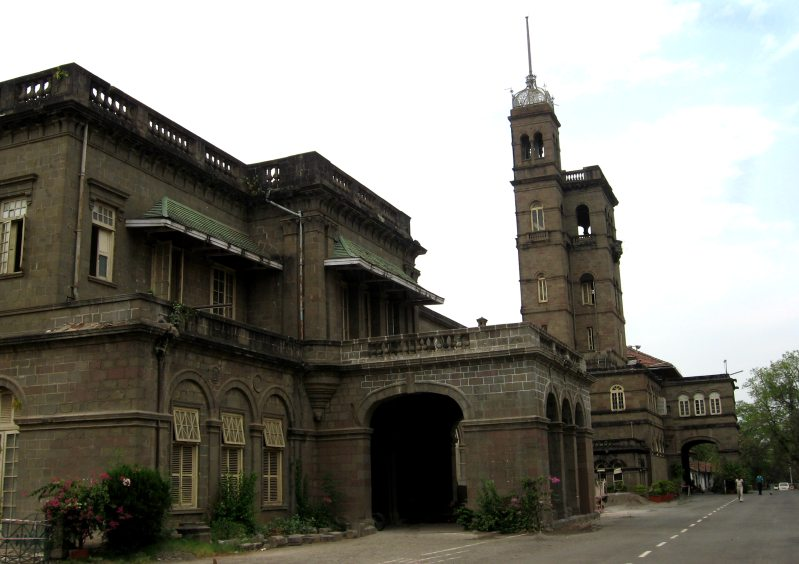
Savitribai Phule Pune University's main building

The city of Pune in western India includes numerous universities, colleges and other institutes. Due to its wide range of educational institutions it has been called the "Oxford of the East".

== Universities ==
=== State University ===
- Savitribai Phule Pune University (formerly University of Pune)

=== Deemed Universities ===
- Bharati Vidyapeeth
- Deccan College Post-Graduate and Research Institute
- Defence Institute of Advanced Technology (formerly Institute of Armament Technology)
- Dnyaneshwar Vidyapeeth
- Gokhale Institute of Politics and Economics
- Indian Institute of Information Technology, Pune
- Indian Institute of Science Education and Research, Pune
- Christ University Pune Lavasa, Campus
- National Institute of Construction Management and Research
- National Defence Academy
- Tilak Maharashtra University
- Spicer Adventist University
- Symbiosis International University

=== Private Universities ===
- Ajeenkya DY Patil University
- Christ University Pune Lavasa, Campus
- Dr. D Y Patil Dnyan Prasad University
- D Y Patil University Pune
- DR. P.A. INAMDAR UNIVERSITY- DR. P.A. INAMDAR UNIVERSITY
- MIT - World Peace University
- MIT University - MIT Art, Design and Technology University
- Spicer Adventist University
- Symbiosis International University
- Symbiosis Skills and Professional University
- Vishwakarma University
- G H Raisoini International Skill Tech University
- ALARD University Pune • Indira University Pune

== Engineering and Technology ==
=== Central Government ===
- Indian Institute of Tropical Meteorology, Pune
- Indian Institute of Information Technology, Pune

=== State Government ===
- College of Agriculture Pune
- College of Engineering Pune
- Government College Of Engineering And Research, Avasari Khurd
- Government Polytechnic Pune

=== Autonomous ===
- AISC - Abeda Inamdar Senior College Of Arts, Science and Commerce, Pune] (AISC)
- Maharashtra Academy of Engineering
- MKSSS's Cummins College of Engineering for Women
- Pimpri Chinchwad College of Engineering
- Vishwakarma Institute of Information Technology
- Vishwakarma Institute of Technology
- Sanjeevani Group of Institutes
- G.H. Raisoni College of Engineering and Management, Wagholi

=== Other ===
- AISSMS College of Engineering
- AISSMS College of Polytechnic
- Army Institute of Technology
- College of Military Engineering, Pune
- Dhole Patil College of Engineering
- Indian Institute of Aeronautical Engineering & Information Technology
- International Institute of Information Technology, Pune
- ISB&M School of Technology
- Jayawantrao Sawant College of Engineering
- Maharashtra Institute of Technology
- MIT College of Engineering
- Modern Education Society's College of Engineering, Pune
- PES Modern College of Engineering, Pune
- Pune Institute of Computer Technology
- Pune Vidhyarthi Griha's College of Engineering and Technology
- Shri Chhatrapati Shivajiraje College of Engineering
- Suman Ramesh Tulsiani Technical Campus - Faculty of Engineering
- Trinity Academy of Engineering

== Management ==
=== Autonomous ===
- Department of Management Sciences (PUMBA)

=== Other ===
- Institute of Management Development and Research, Pune
- MIT School of Business
- National Institute of Bank Management
- National Insurance Academy
- Symbiosis Institute of Management Studies
- Christ University Pune Lavasa, Campus
- Vishwakarma Institute of Management
- MES Garware College of Commerce
- Sinhgad Institute Of Business Administration And Research

== Medical ==
- Armed Forces Medical College
- B. J. Medical College
- Bharati Vidhyapeeth Medical College
- Dr. D. Y. Patil Medical College, Hospital & Research Centre
- Smt.Kashibai Navale Medical College
- Maharashtra Institute of Medical Education and Research

== Arts, Commerce and Science ==
=== Autonomous ===
- Fergusson College
- Abasaheb Garware College
- Modern College Of Arts, Science and Commerce, Chhatrapati Shivaji Maharaj Nagar, Pune
- Brihan Maharashtra College of Commerce
- Tikaram Jagannth College of Arts, Commerce and Science

=== Other ===
- AISSMS College of Pharmacy
- Army Law College
- College of Pharmacy (Pune)
- Chandrashekhar Agashe College of Physical Education
- Dnyaneshwar Vidyapeeth
- Film and Television Institute of India
- ILS Law College
- Mahindra United World College of India
- MIT Institute Of Design
- National School of Leadership
- Ness Wadia College of Commerce
- Nowrosjee Wadia College
- R. D. College of Pharmacy
- Sir Parashurambhau College
- Sri Shahu Mandir Mahavidyalaya
- St. Mira's College for Girls
- St. Vincent College of Commerce
- Symbiosis Centre for Management Studies
- Symbiosis Institute of Computer Studies and Research
- Symbiosis Law School
- Symbiosis School of Economics
- Sinhgad College of Commerce

== Research institutes ==
- Agharkar Research Institute
- Centre for Development of Advanced Computing
- Indian Institute of Science Education and Research, Pune
- Inter-University Centre for Astronomy and Astrophysics
- National Centre for Cell Science
- National Centre for Radio Astrophysics, which operates the Giant Metrewave Radio Telescope
- National Chemical Laboratory
- National Institute of Virology

== See also ==
- List of schools in Maharashtra
