= Kothrud =

- Neighborhood
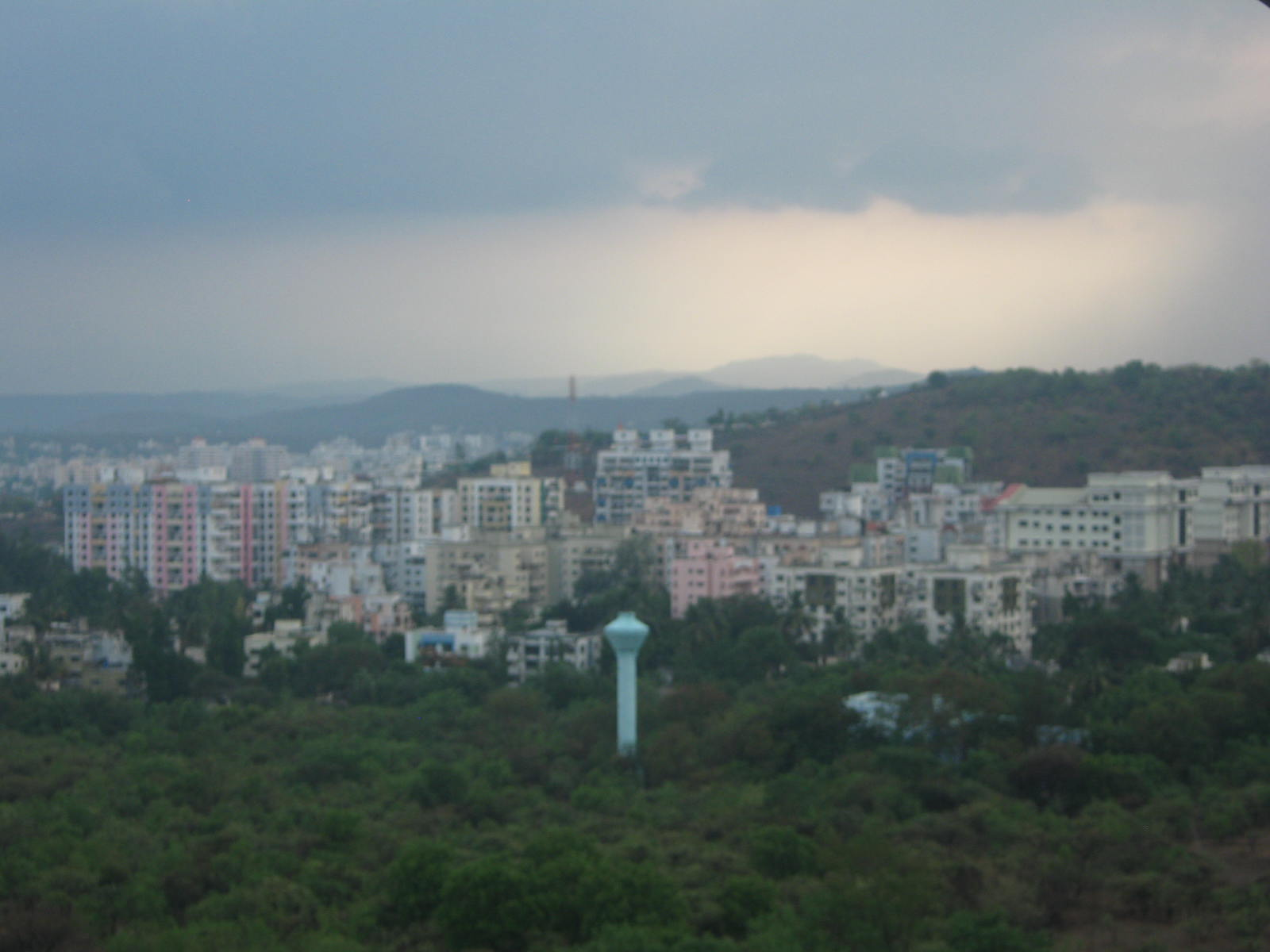
- Panoramic view of Kothrud

- Location in Maharashtra, India
- Coordinates: 18.5333°N 73.8514°E
- Country: India
- State: Maharashtra
- District: Pune

Government
  - Body: Pune Municipal Corporation
- Demonym: Kothrudkar

Languages
  - Official: Marathi
- Time zone: UTC+5:30 (IST)
- PIN: 411038
- Postal code: 411029
- Vehicle registration: MH-12
- Lok Sabha constituency: Pune
- Vidhan Sabha constituency: Kothrud

Kothrud (Kothrud Baug during the Maratha Empire era) is an upmarket residential suburb in the city of Pune. Once boasting the tag of Asia's fastest developing suburb, Kothrud of 2025 faces several challenges of urban planning, traffic congestion, environmental degradation, and to some extent, rising crime rates.

The neighbourhood is located in the West-Central part of the city. During recent times, Kothrud has seen rapid expansion as well as development in commercial and residential real estate. Landmarks in Kothrud include the Mrutyunjayeshwar Temple dating to Peshwa times. This is also next to where Mastani once lived.

Several prominent citizens of Pune who are active in Bollywood, Marathi cinema, media, cricket, and politics reside in Kothrud.

== Economy ==
Kothrud is a primarily residential suburb. Over the past decades many schools, colleges, hospitals, restaurants, cinemas, malls, theatres, health clubs, as well as business establishments have come to dot the area. Kothrud Industrial Estate is a prominent locality comprising many independent small and micro industries, industrial ancillary workshops and printing shops. Kothrud lies conveniently connected to IT establishments of Cognizant, Persistent Systems and Tech Mahindra. Offices of information technology companies such as Harbinger Systems, Harbinger Knowledge Products and e-Zest Solutions are also located in Kothrud. The registered office of Kirloskar Industries is located in Kothrud. A manufacturing facility of Cummins India Ltd located in the western part of the area for decades, is known by the name of Kothrud Engine Plant. Automotive Research Association of India or ARAI, is located atop Vetal Tekdi overlooking Kothrud on its southern slopes. New age startups like StomatoBot Technologies, which automates CCTV Surveillance for proactive mobile alerts in near real-time, using Computer Vision and Deep Learning, have also appeared in Kothrud.

Apart from multiple local vegetable markets, State-organised weekly farmers' markets and consumer-driven direct-from-farm initiates are held in Kothrud.

The presence of many large educational institutions has meant a substantial student population and a proportionate housing, food and service economy. Throughout recent years, the single largest economic activity throughout this area has been the construction of residential buildings, mostly as redevelopment of older buildings leading to taller buildings and the urban issues owing to relentlessly increasing density.

== Geography ==
Kothrud, one of the earliest and now largest suburbs of Pune, is bounded between Vetal Tekdi hills on the North and Karve Nagar and Mutha river on the South. Kothrud primarily consists of areas around Paud Road and Karve Road. Paud Road begins at Paud Phata and leads to Paud Gaon via Chandani Chowk on the Katraj-Dehu Bypass on the Mumbai-Bengaluru NH4, which also forms the western boundary of Kothrud. Karve Road begins in Deccan and ends at Warje.

A few walking trails leading up to Vetal Tekdi originate at some places in Kothrud. The natural vegetation and man-made plantations on the hill lend the adjoining neighbourhoods a sense of calm, although the hill slopes and the forest cover have been steadily impacted due to the fast-paced growth and development in and around this area. The Indian Meteorological Department (IMD) recently dropped plans to install the X-band Doppler Weather Radar for Pune district at the Vetal Tekdi citing operational difficulties and resistance from locals who perceived the project as a threat to the fragile ecosystem of the hills. Kothrud enjoys the same generally mild and pleasant Pune weather with a slight advantage of the cooler westerly breeze reaching the city, and in some neighbourhoods, a hyperlocal advantage of proximity to the Vetal Tekdi or Mahatma Hill.

Groundwater is accessible throughout the year in most parts thanks largely to the underlying geology and the large unconfined aquifers held in and recharged by the Vetal Tekdi hill complex. As in every urban growth spot, the rising population density threatens the tree cover, open grounds that allow percolation of stormwater, and consequently the quality and sustainability of groundwater.

== Population ==
According to Pune Municipal Corporation (PMC) ward-wise population data based on 2011 census, the population recorded for all wards nested under Kothrud is 209,331. There are no reliable pointers to estimate the population in 2025. An extrapolation using 2.45% growth rate yields an approximate number of 300,962. For reference, and in the absence of a formal census in 2021, the population of Pune Metropolitan Region is arrived at by The United Nations World Urbanisation Prospects as being 7,525,720 starting with a number of 580,848 in 1950, and a rate of growth of 2.45%.

== Localities ==
The major localities in Kothrud include Anand Nagar, Bharti Nagar, Bhelke Nagar, Bhusari Colony, Chandani Chowk, Dahanukar Colony, Eklavya College, Ex-Servicemen's Colony, Gananjay Society, Gujarat Colony, Guruganesh Nagar, Happy Colony, Ideal Colony, Jaibhawaninagar, Jijainagar, Karve Putala, Kishkindha Nagar, Lokmanya Colony, Madhav Baug, Mahatma Society, Mayur Colony, Paschimanagari, Rahul Nagar, Rambaug Colony, Shastrinagar, Shikshaknagar, Shivaji Putala, Shivteerth Nagar, Thorat Baug, Tejasnagar, Vanaz, Sutardara, and pockets of informal settlements across the entire neighbourhood.

== Transport ==
=== Pune Metro ===
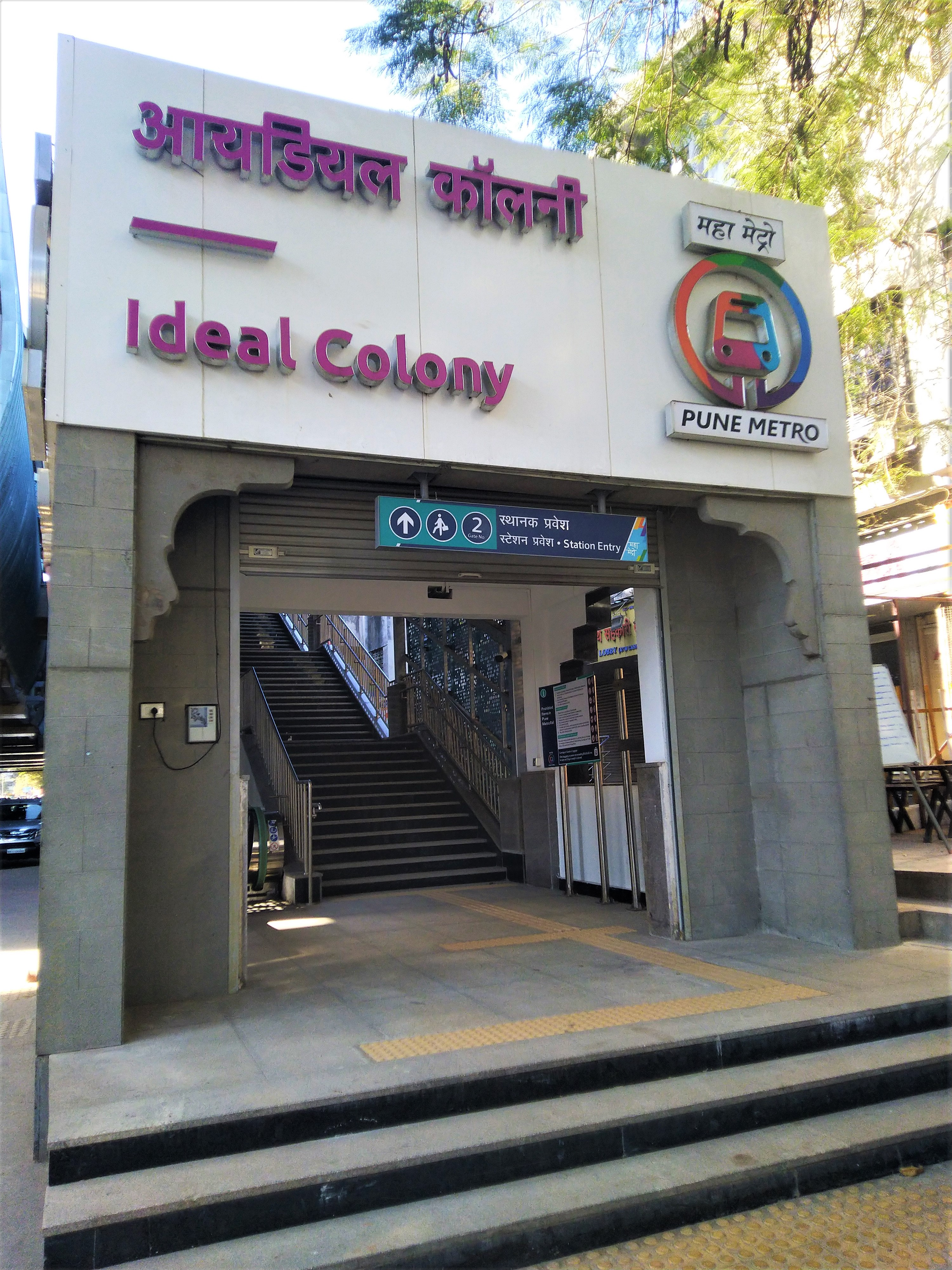
Entrance of Ideal Colony metro station, Kothrud Kothrud bus stand

The Pune Metro Aqua Line is the first Metro line to start in Pune. Three metro stations on the Aqua (Vanaz to Ramwadi) Line, viz. Vanaz, Ideal Colony and Anand Nagar serve Kothrud since March 2022, connecting the suburb with the rest of the city.

=== Road and Bus ===
Kothrud is connected by the Pune Mahanagar Parivahan Mahamandal Limited and operates two main bus depots: Kothrud Depot and Kothrud Stand. Buses connect Kothrud to other parts of Pune like Nigdi, Hadapsar, Swargate, Chakan, and villages mostly to the West and South of Pune city, such as Khed-Shivapur, Panshet and Pirangut. Direct buses to the Wipro Circle in Hinjawadi IT hub ply the 33 Km route only in the morning and evening hours. A recently set up Kumbare Park (also called Kumbre Park) terminus on D.P. Road operates PMPML buses to major parts of Pune city like Market Yard, Pune Station, Vadgaosheri and Sainathnagar.

Many private and MSRTC intercity buses from and to Mumbai, Thane, Raigad and Alibaug halt at Vanaz Corner in Kothrud to drop and pick-up passengers.

Karve Road connects Kothrud to the heart of city, while Paud Road connects it to the outskirts of city.

=== Cycling, Pedestrian or Non-motorised Transport ===
Pune was once known as the bicycle city of Maharashtra and has historically had a high bicycling modal share of 35% in the 1980s. This dwindled to just 13% in 2003. Likewise in Kothrud, cyclists are a rare sight, while dedicated cycle tracks and decent footpaths persist as a topic on the wish-list.

== Education ==
MIT World Peace University is a private university in Kothrud.

Kothrud is known for many educational institutions that draw students in from across the Indian subcontinent, as well as from countries in Asia and Africa. The large student population is an integral part of the economy and culture. Prominent institutions include:

=== Middle Schools and High Schools ===
- Abhinava Vidyalaya English Medium School
- Bal Shikshan Mandir English Medium School
- Bharati Vidyapeeth English Medium School
- City International School Kothrud
- P. Jog English & Marathi Medium School
- Kalmadi Shamrao High School, Erandwane
- Millennium National School, Karve Nagar
- New India School
- Paranjape Vidya Mandir
- Sevasadan English Medium School, Erandwane

=== Engineering Colleges ===
- Maharashtra Institute of Technology
- Marathwada Mitra Mandal's College of Engineering
- MKSSS's Cummins College of Engineering for Women

=== Management Institutes ===
- MIT-WPU Faculty of Management
- MIT World Peace University
- MES Institute Of Management and Career Courses

==== Law Colleges ====
P. Jog Law College

== Museums ==
- Joshi's Museum of Miniature Railways houses a remarkable collection of miniature trains, locomotives and model railways from different eras and regions around the world. The museum consists of a working model of an entire city. The exhibits chronicle the evolution of railway technology, from the earliest steam engines to the modern high-speed train.
- Vikram Pendse Cycle Museum has over 150 bicycles, the oldest of which is from 1916. This private collection has many other bicycle related artefacts, tools, toys, and motorbikes.

== Fire Brigade ==
The Kothrud Fire Brigade of Pune Municipal Corporation is stationed at S. No. 2/1, Near Kothrud Stand on Karve Road.

== Gallery ==
Dasbhuja Ganapati Mandir

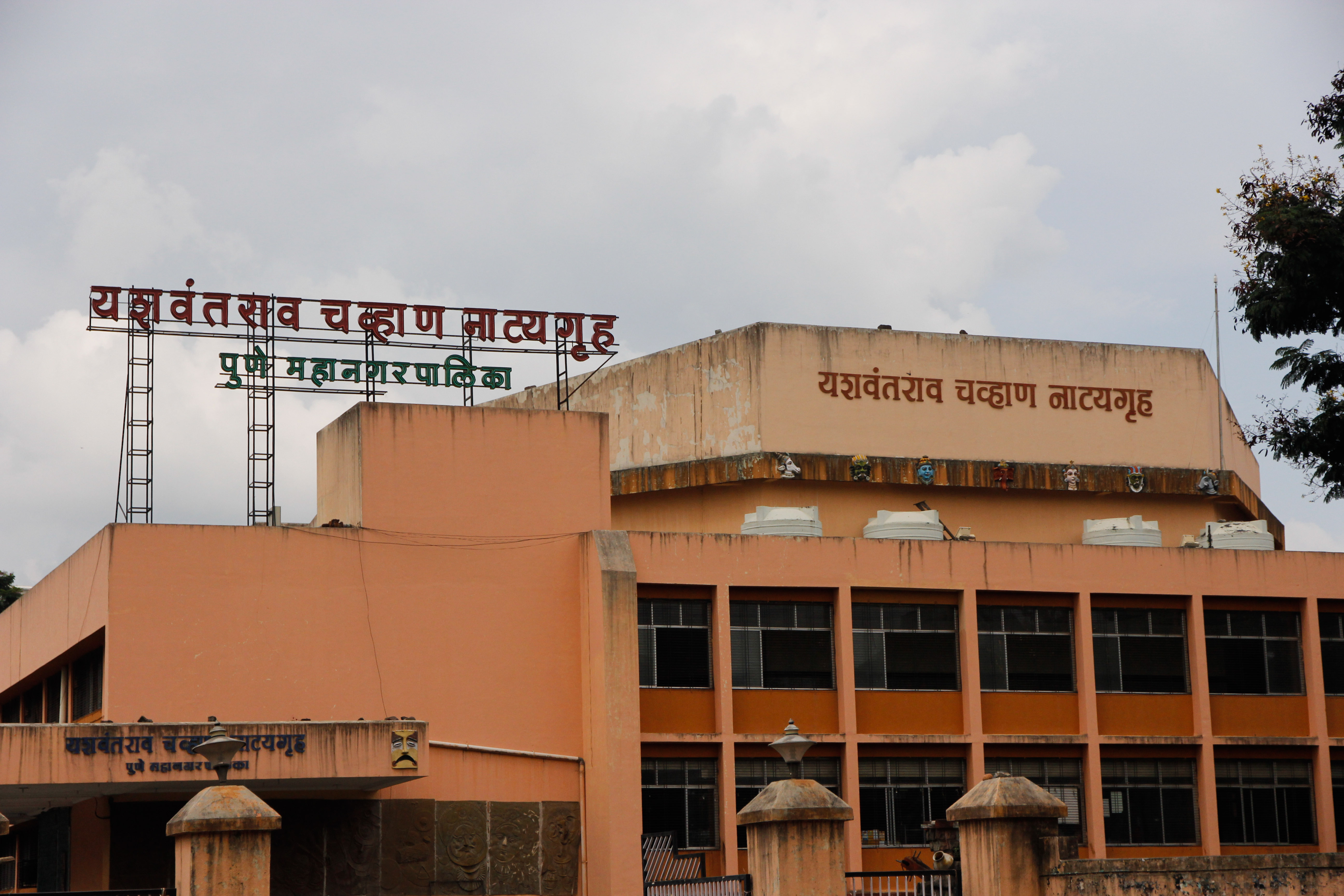
Yashwantrao Chavan Natya Gruha

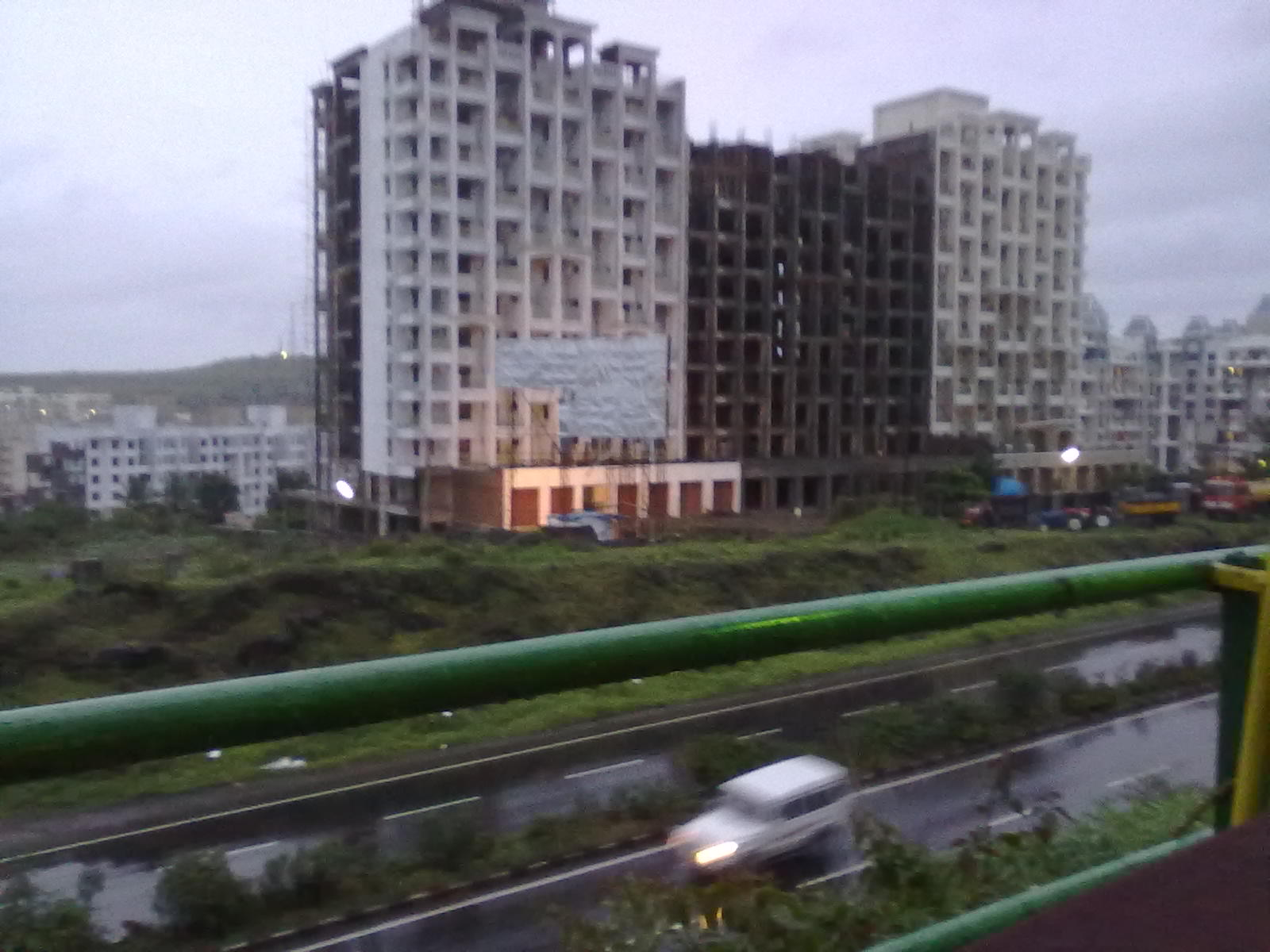
Chandani Chowk

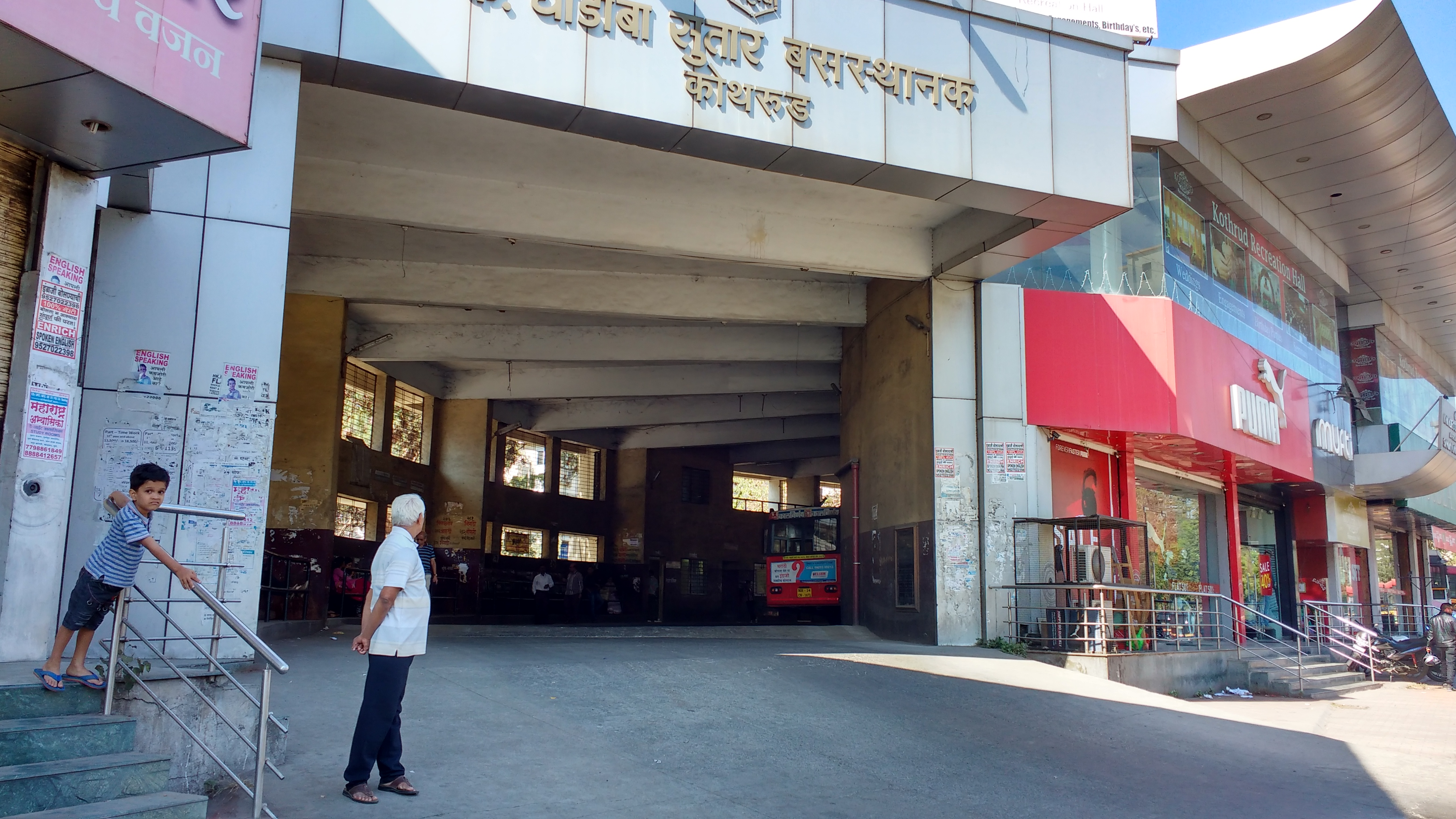
Kothrud Bus Stand

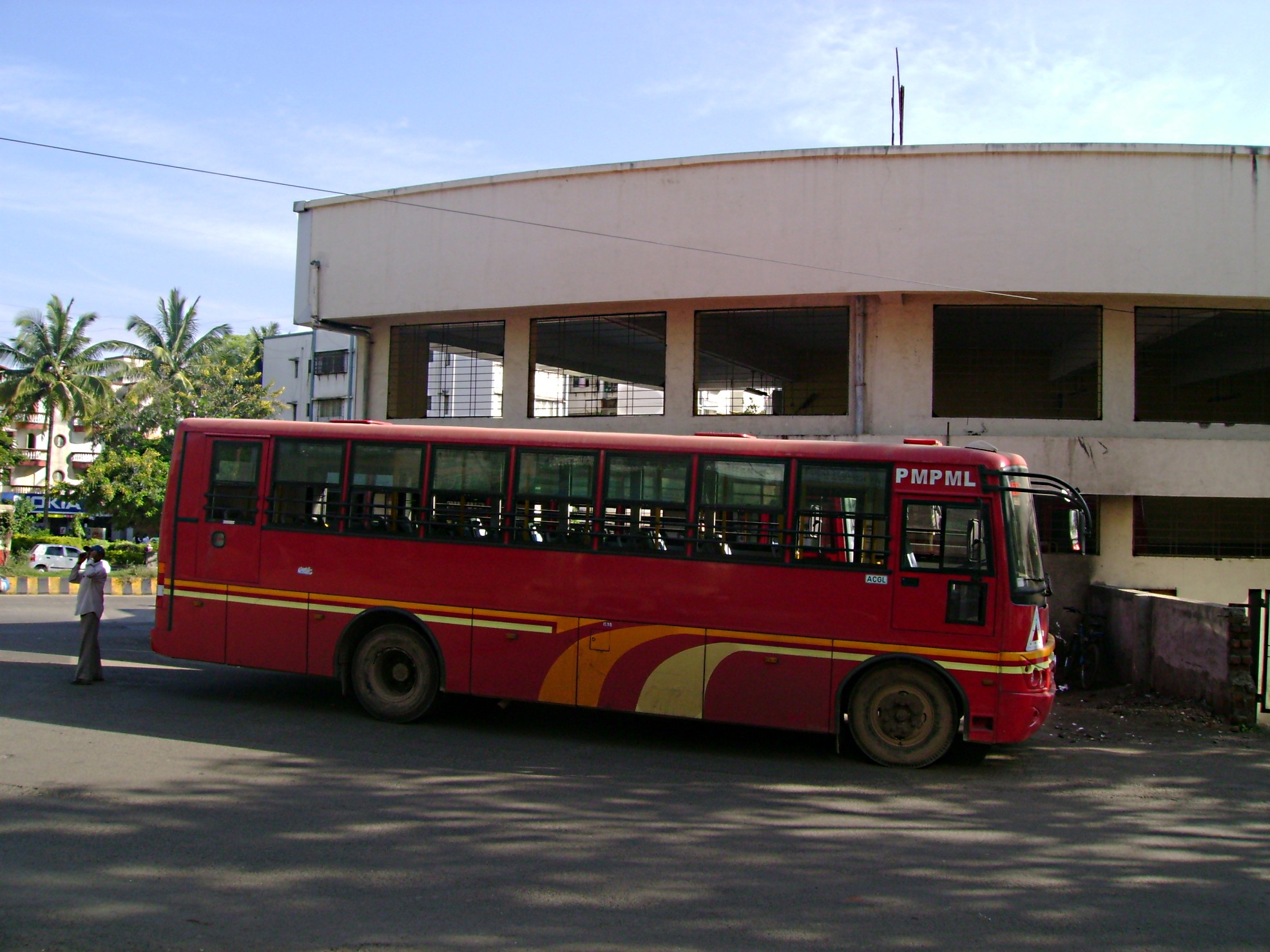
PMPML City Bus

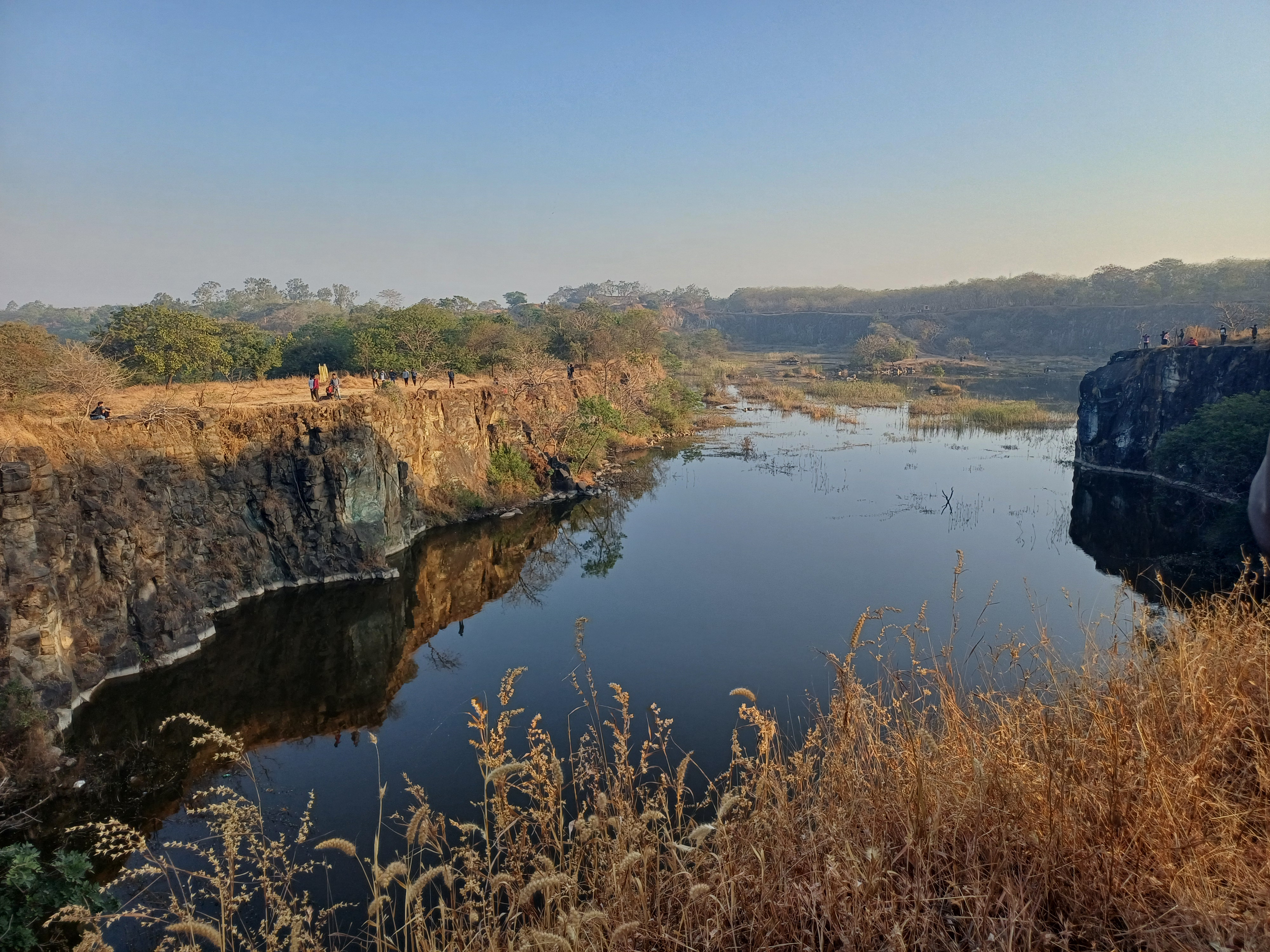
Quarry on Vetal Tekdi

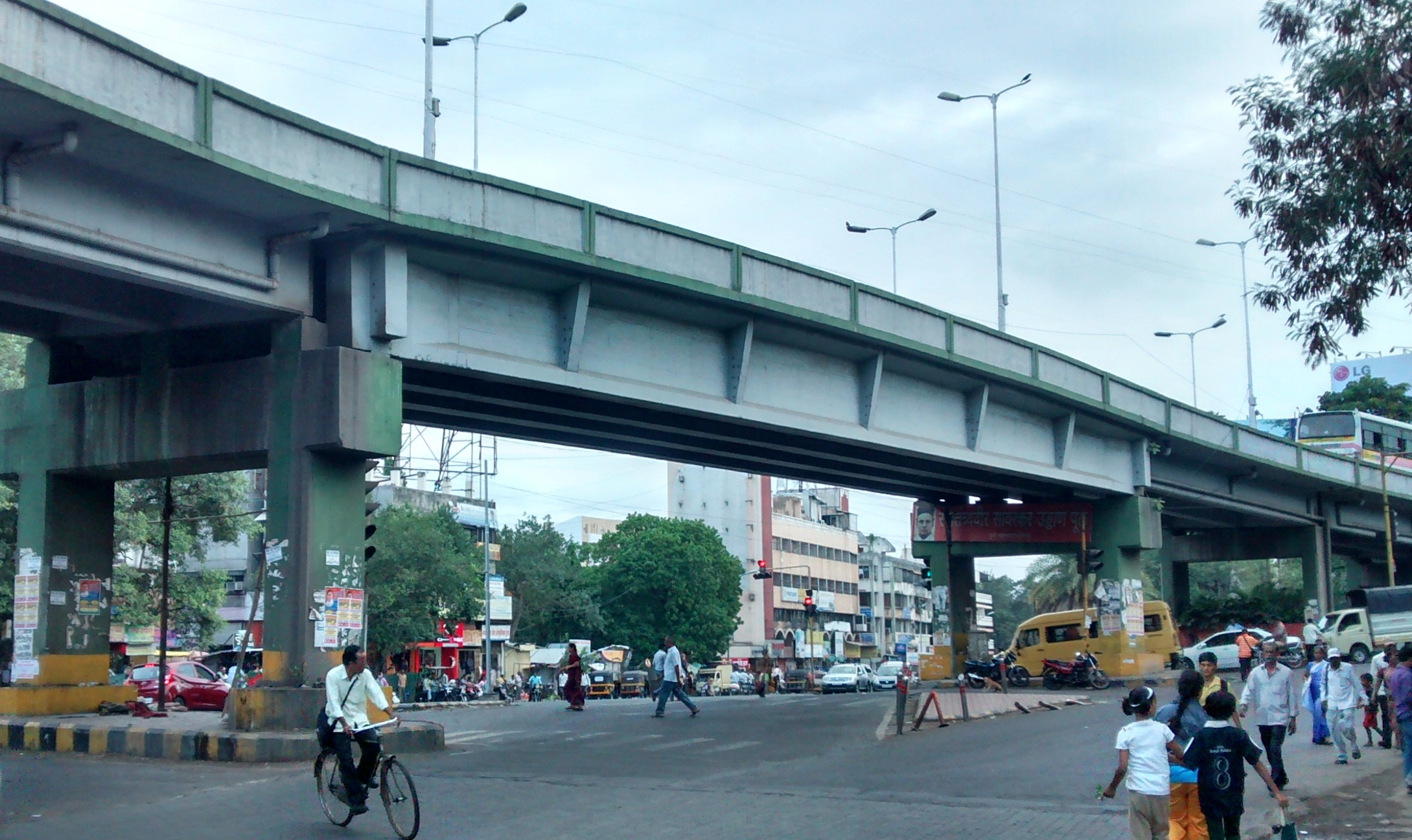
Paud Phata Flyover

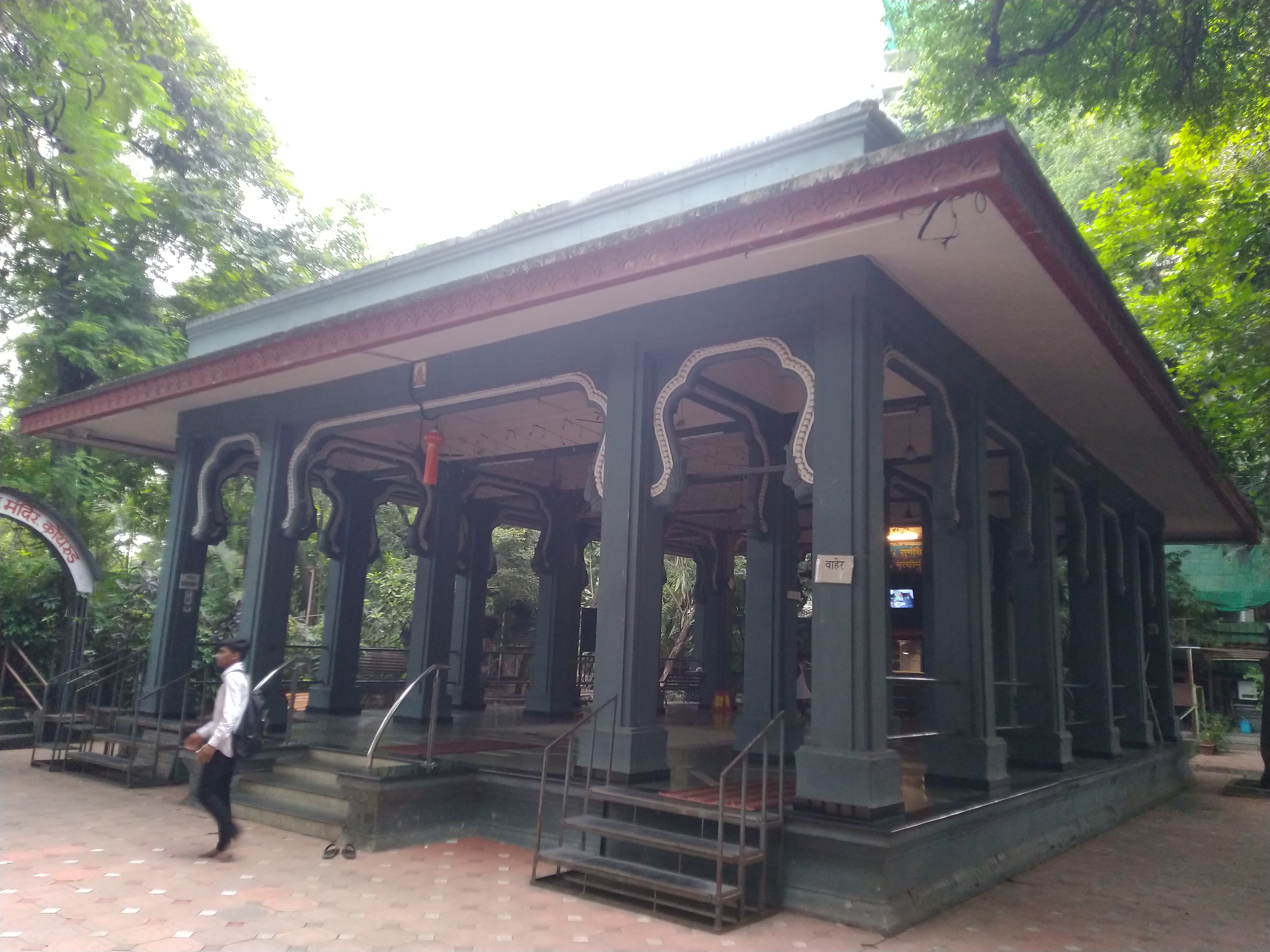
Mrutyunjayeshwar Mandir

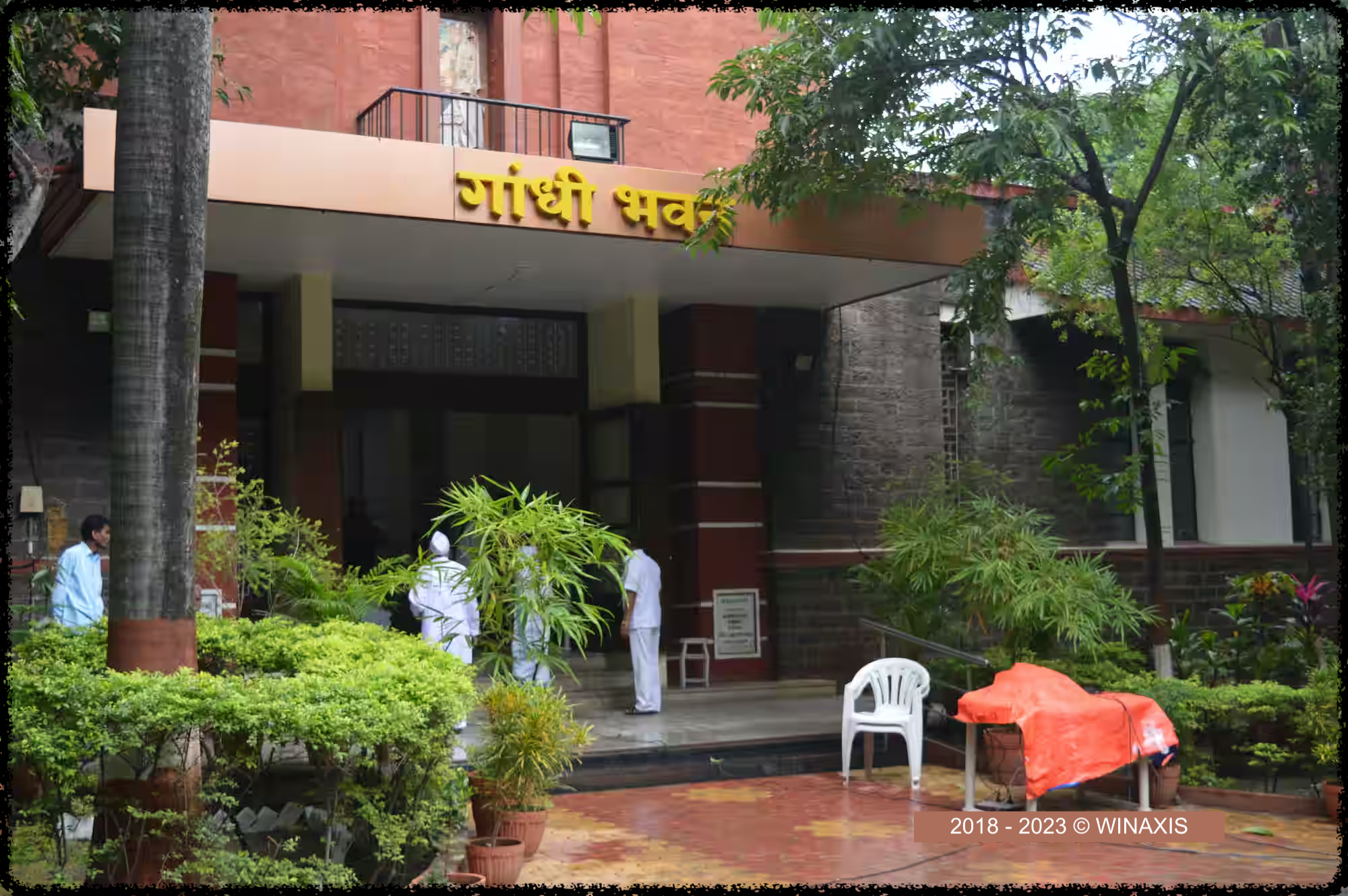
Gandhi Bhavan

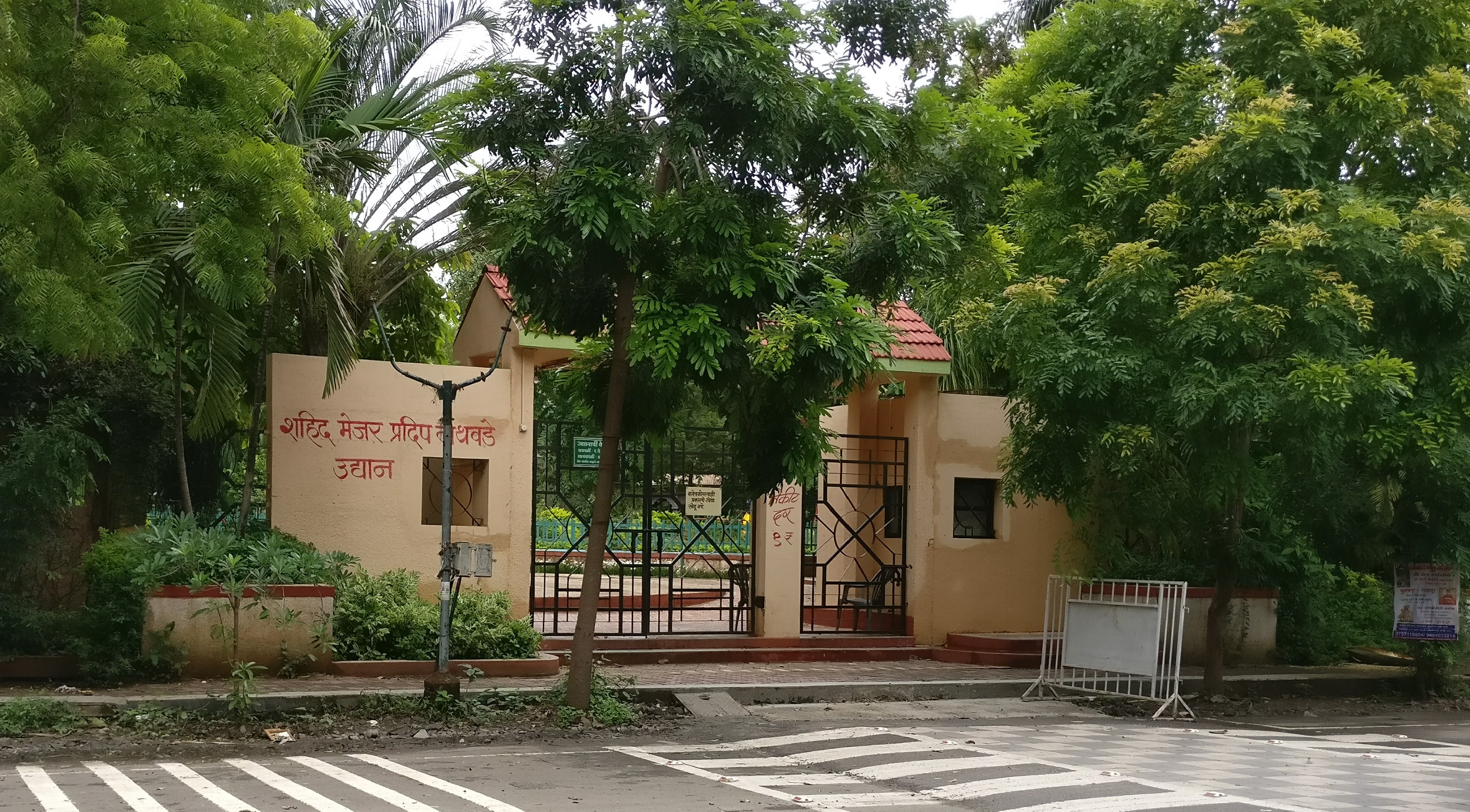
Shahid Major Pradeep Tathawade Udyan

== See also ==
- Pune
- Pune District
- List of roads in Pune
- Pune Metropolitan Region
