= Shivajinagar, Pune =

Shivaji Nagar Bhambwade, Bhamburde
- Neighbourhood
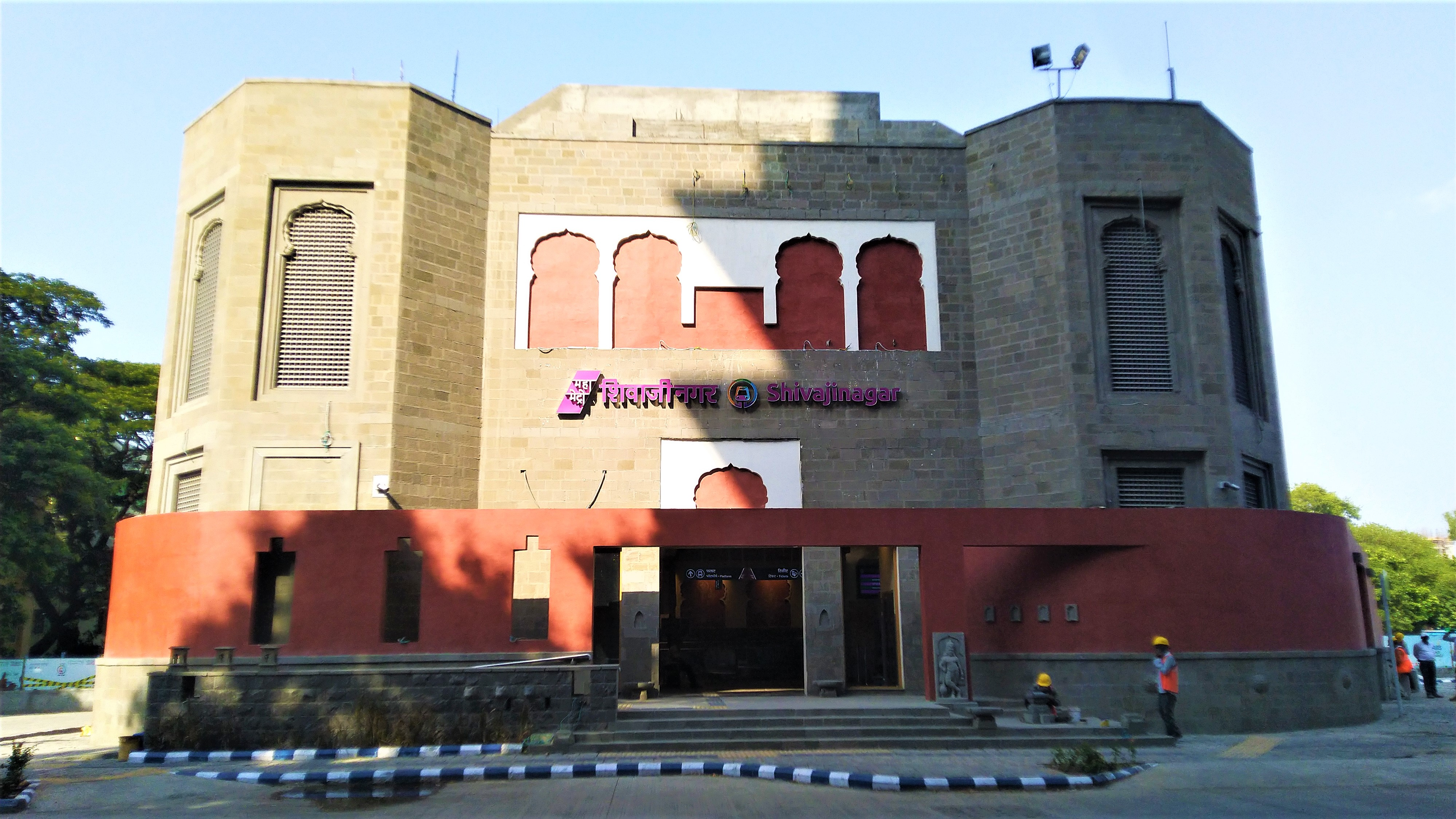
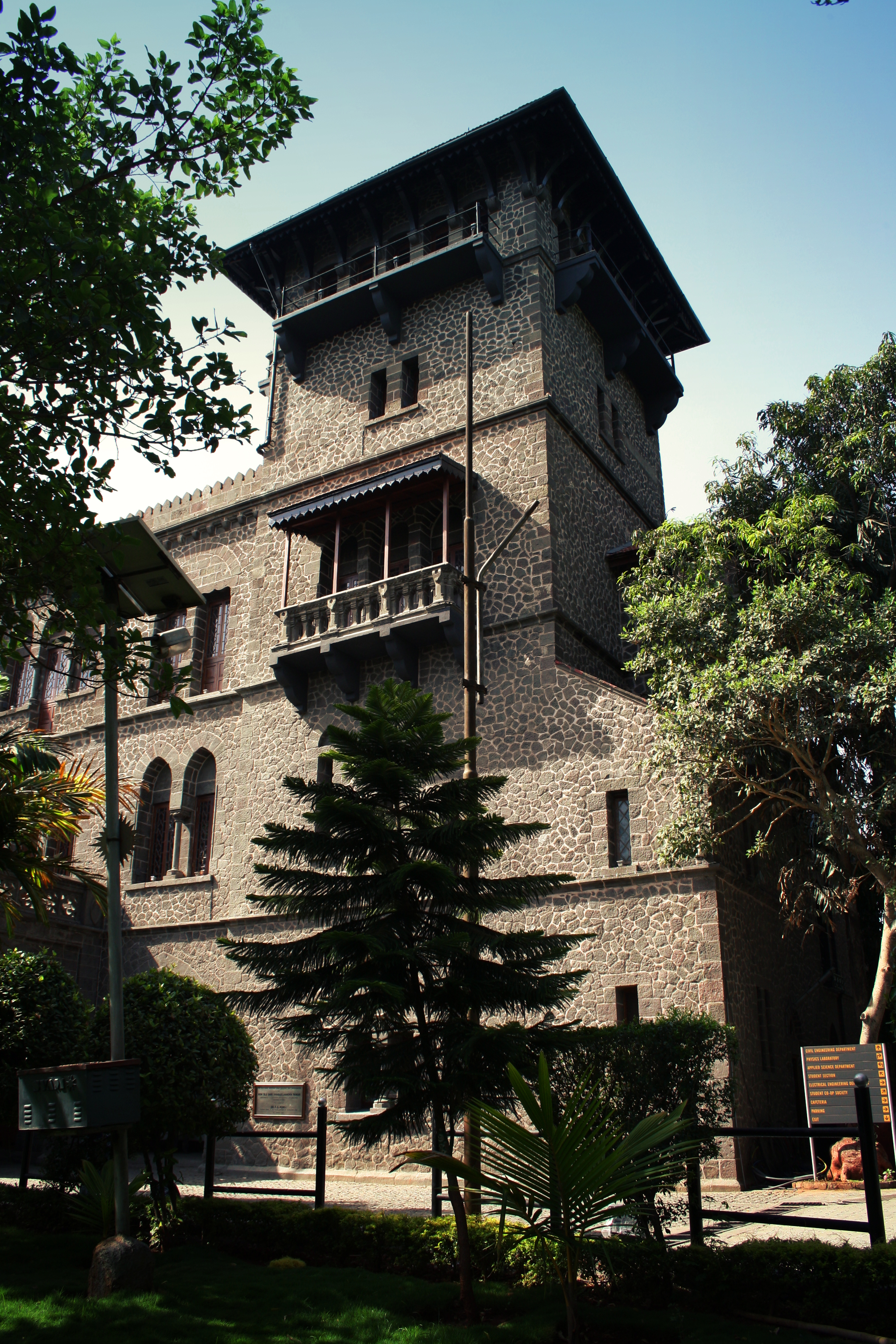
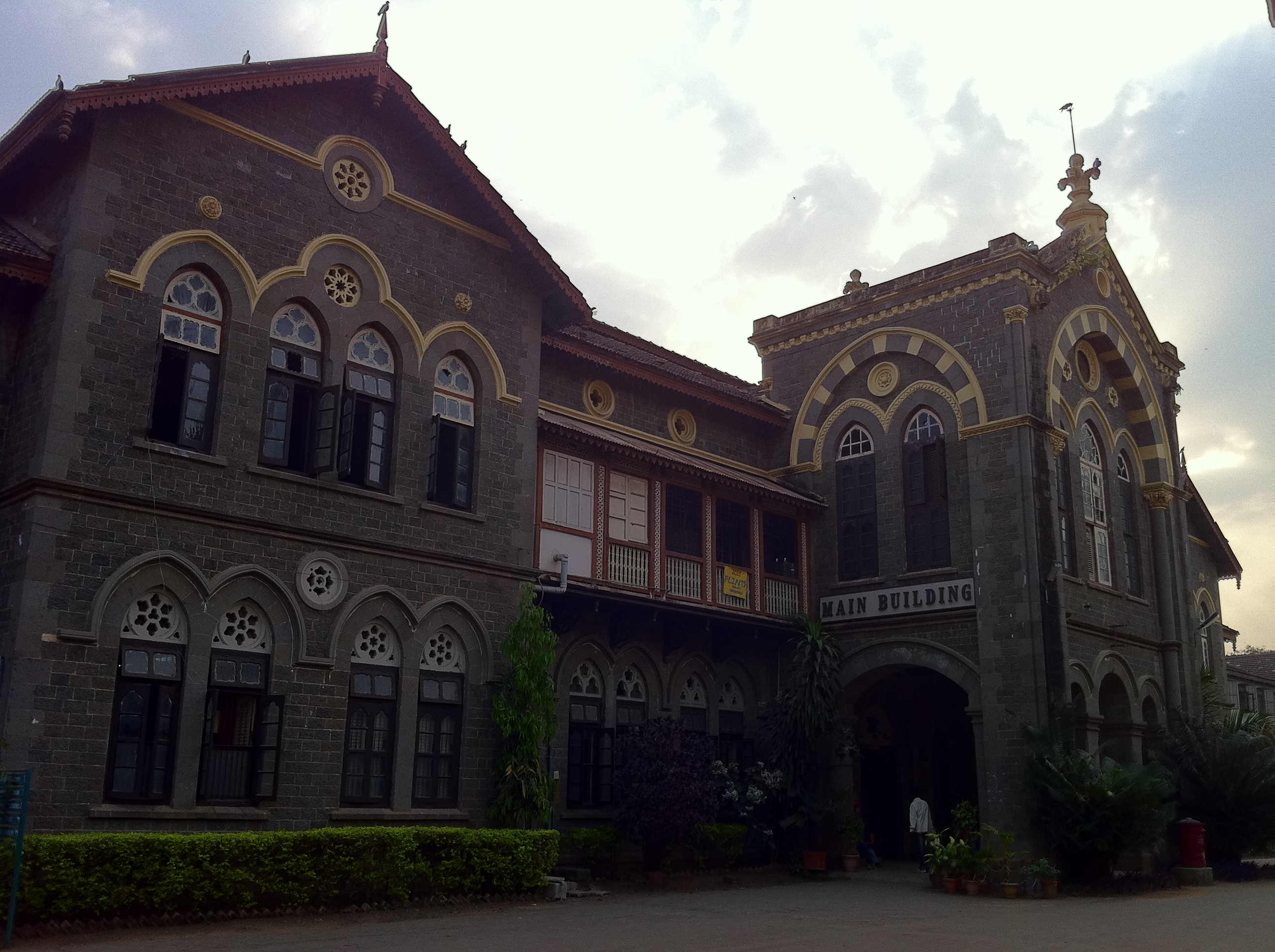
- Clockwise from top: Shivaji Nagar Metro Station, Fergusson College, COEP building
- Interactive map of Shivaji Nagar
- Coordinates: 18°31′53″N 73°50′40″E
- Country: India
- State: Maharashtra
- District: Pune

Government
  - Type: Pune Municipal Corporation

Languages
  - Official: Marathi & English
- Time zone: UTC+5:30 (IST)
- PIN: 411 005
- Vehicle registration: MH 12, MH 14
- Lok Sabha Constituency: Pune
- Vidhan Sabha Constituency: Shivajinagar

Shivajinagar (also known as Bhambwade, Bhamburde) is an inner suburb of the city of Pune, India.

== History ==
Shivajinagar has a very long history, with the 8th-century, Rashtrakuta-era Pataleshwar Caves temple being the oldest manmade structure in Pune.

The neighbourhood was earlier a village known as Bhambwade, with the name changing over time to Bhamburde. During the Maratha and British periods, Bhamburde's Patil (Village chief) came from the Shirole Patil family, members of which also served in the Maratha Army. In the Peshwa era, a handmade paper factory was located in the village.

In the 19th century, Jangali Maharaj, a ascetic yogi saint revered by Hindus, settled down here. A temple with his samadhi is located today in Shivajinagar and a major road in the locality is named after him.

The Inamdar and Patil of Bhamburde, Rajaram Naroji Shirole Patil, leased 37 acres of land at the foot of Hanuman Tekdi (hill) for 99 years to the Deccan Education Society in 1885. The society's best-known institution, Fergusson College, was built on this land.

In the early 20th century, Wadarvadi, one of the oldest and biggest slums in Pune today, came up on unused land belonging to the Shirole Patil family close to the Chaturshrungi Temple and at the foot of Hanuman Tekdi, near today's Senapati Bapat Road. Wadarvadi is inhabited mainly by the formerly nomadic Waddar community.

A statue of Shivaji was installed in the locality in 1928. The Shri Shivaji military preparatory school was later established nearby.

After Indian Independence in 1947, Bhamburde was renamed Shivajinagar after Shivaji.

== Geography ==
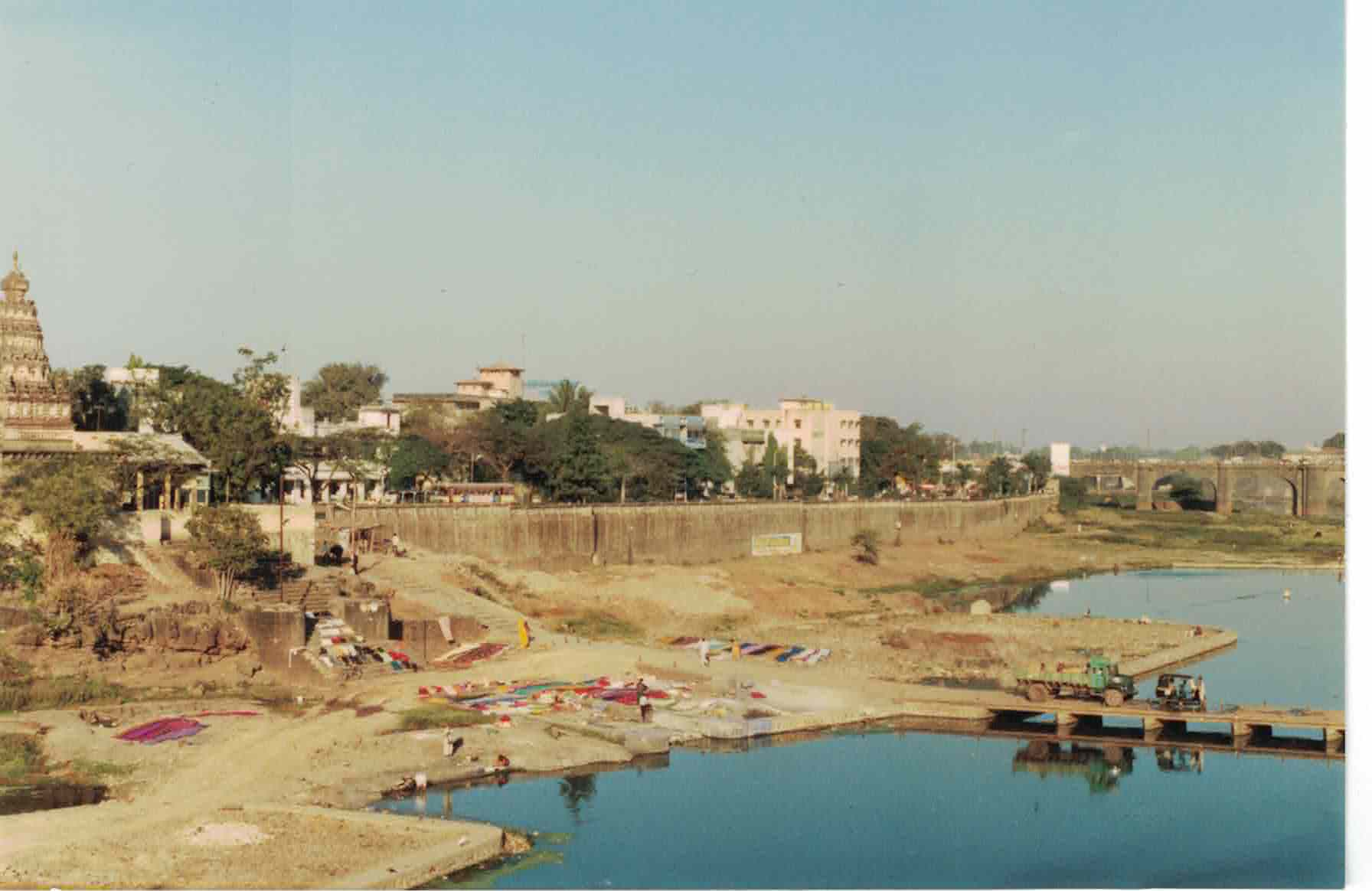
Mutha River at Shivajinagar in the 1980s

Shivajinagar is situated on the West bank of the Mutha River with the older parts of Pune on the east side of the river. The area is surrounded on its Western side by the Vetal and Hanuman Hills. The village deity (Gramdaivat) is the temple of Rokdoba (God Hanuman) in Shivajinagar Gaothan. The Gaothan also has a temple of God Shri Ram.

== Transport ==
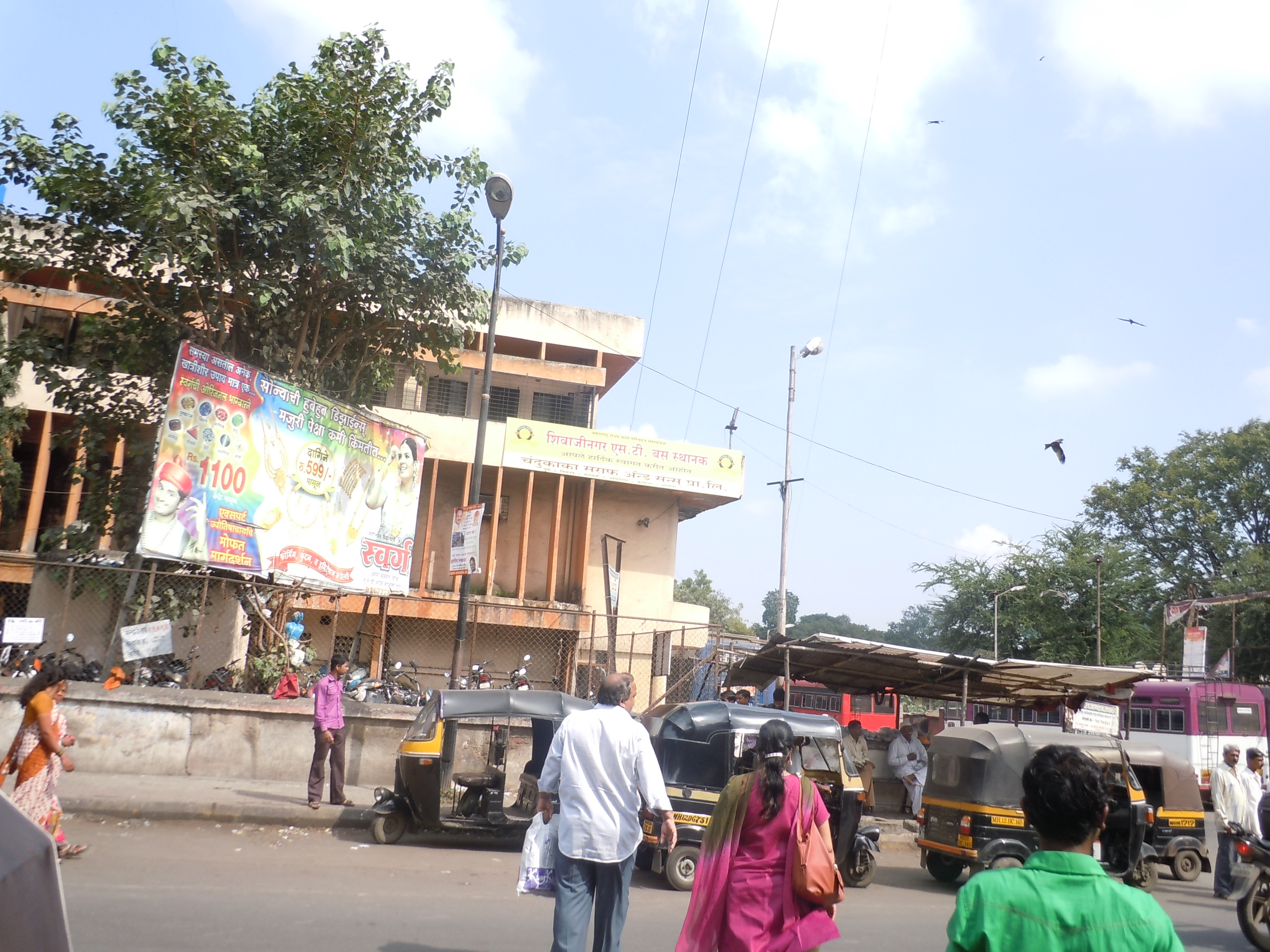
Shivajinagar bus stand

The Mumbai – Pune old national highway begins from Shivajinagar which links Pune to Mumbai. MSRTC operates a bus station that connects Pune to almost all cities in Maharashtra as well in neighboring states. Shivajinagar is well connected to other parts of the city by local PMPML buses. Shivajinagar has Shivaji Nagar railway station. Pune to Lonavla suburban trains and few long-distance trains make a stop here at Shivajinagar and Pune railway stations.

== Institutions ==
The area is home to many central, state and local government offices. These include:

- Pune District Court
- Pune Municipal Corporation
- India Meteorological Department - Pune regional office, popularly known as Shimla office
- All India Radio - Akashwani Bhavan, Pune
- Cognizant Company
- ICC Tower
- Bank Of India Zonal Office, Pune

== Educational institutions ==
The area has a number of renowned educational institutions with a long history such as Fergusson college, Modern College of Arts, Commerce and Science Shivajinagar, College of engineering and agricultural college.

=== Universities and colleges ===
- Indian Law Society's Law College
- Savitribai Phule Pune University- erstwhile "University of Pune"
- Marathwada Mitra Mandal College of Commerce
- Fergusson College
- Brihan Maharashtra College of Commerce
- Symbiosis College
- Modern College
- Hotel Management College
- College of Engineering
- Agricultural College
- GIPE - Gokhale Institute of Politics And Economics

=== Schools ===
- Bharat English School (Pune)
- Modern School
- Bharatiya Vidya Bhavan
- Vidya Bhavan High School and Junior College
- Shri Shivaji Preparatory Military School (Pune).

== Places of interest ==
Shivajinagar has many places dedicated to culture, religion, sports, shopping, eating out, and recreation. The area is popular for its many eateries, and cafes, especially with the younger generation.

=== Places of worship ===
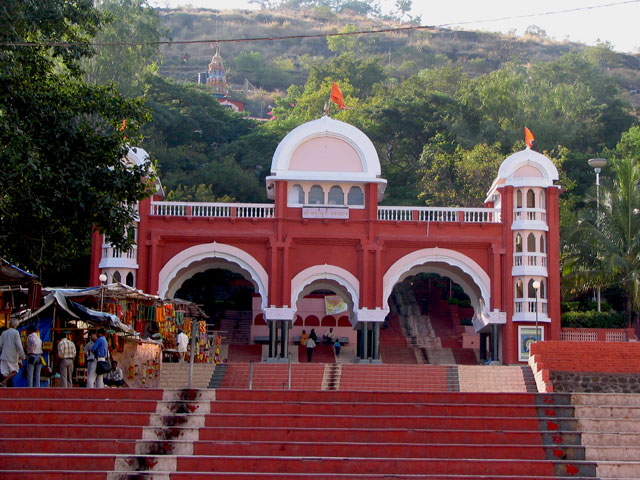
Gates of Chaturshringi temple

- Ajitnath Jain Temple
- Pataleshwar Caves
- Rokdoba Temple
- Shri Ram Temple
- Jangli Maharaj Tomb (Samadhi) Temple
- Chaturshrungi Temple
- Vetal Temple

=== Museums, parks, sports, and theater ===
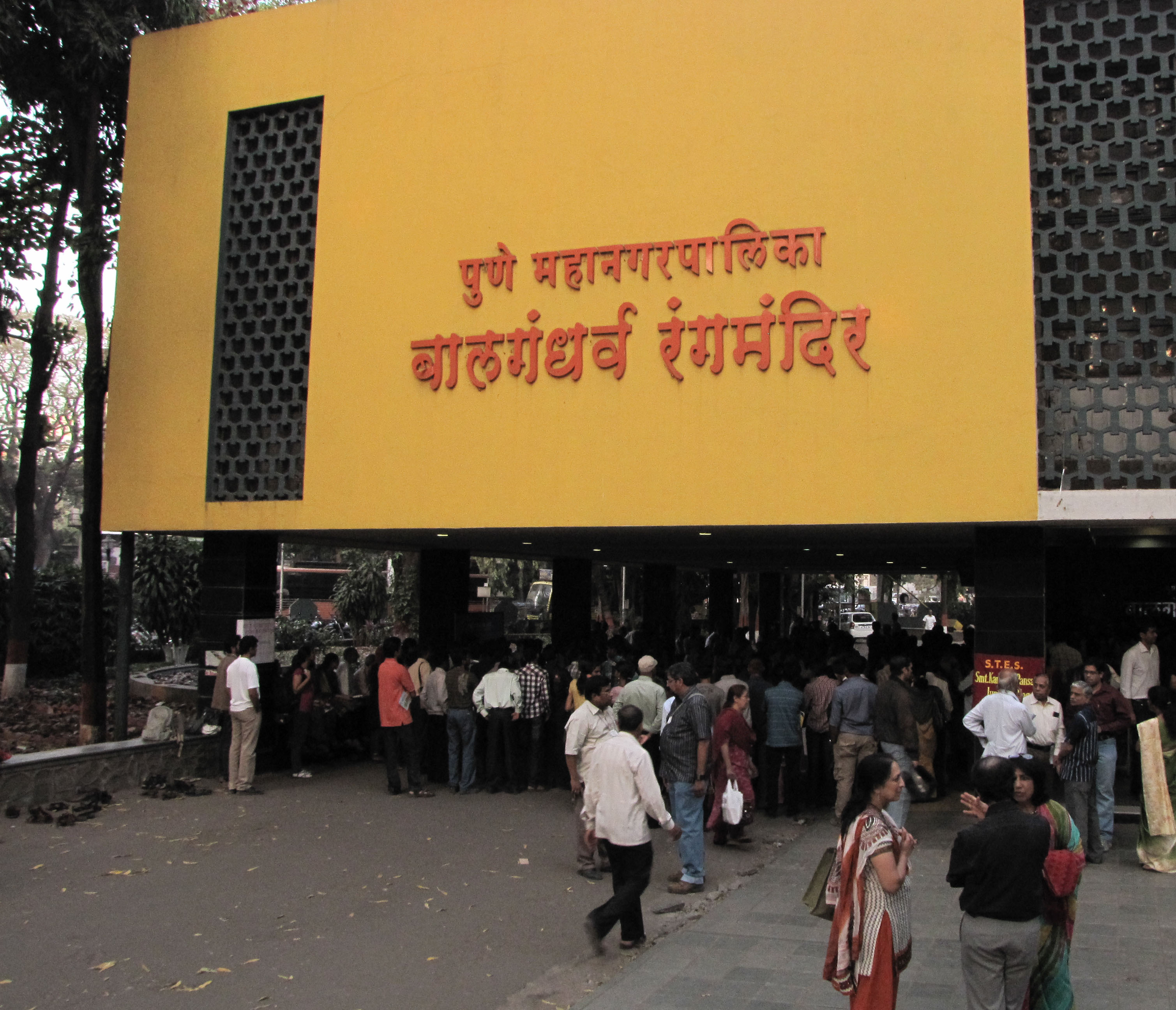
Balgandharv Rang Mandir theatre

- Mahatma Phule Museum of Industry
- Bal Gandharva Ranga Mandir - the premier theatre in Pune for staging Marathi drama.
- Deccan Gymkhana - oldest sports club and housing society in the area
- Chhatrapati Sambhaji Udyan - a park along the Mutha river bank
- Vetal Hill and Hanuman Hill - protected nature reserves on hills
- City Pride Mangala Cinema Theatre
- City Pride Theatre and Mall
- Rahul 70 mm Cinema Theatre
- E-Square Theatre and Mall

=== Shopping ===
- Pavilion Mall
- Pune Central Mall

== See also ==
- Pune Suburban Railway
