= Symbiosis University =

Symbiosis University may refer to

- Symbiosis International (Deemed University)
- Symbiosis Skills and Professional University
- Symbiosis University of Applied Sciences
