= Spicer Adventist University =

University in Pune, Maharashtra

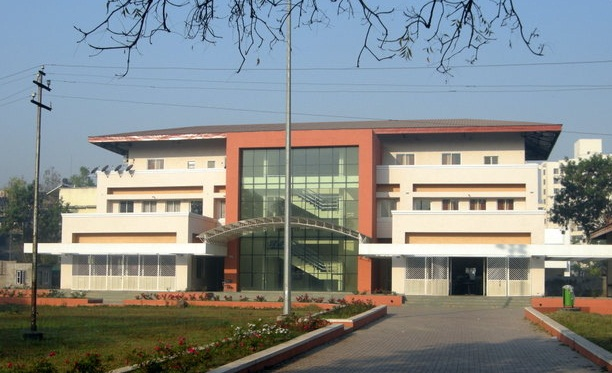
- Motto: He shall teach you all things
- Type: Private
- Established: 1915; 111 years ago
- Affiliations: Seventh-day Adventist
- President: Ezras Lakra
- Vice-Chancellor: Dr. Milon Rana
- Administrative staff: approx. 160
- Students: approx. 1,200
- Location: Aundh, Pune, Maharashtra, India; 18.5638°N 73.8193°E
- Campus: Urban
- Website: http://sau.edu.in/
- Location within Maharashtra Location within India

Spicer Adventist University is a Seventh-day Adventist institution of higher learning in Aundh, Pune, India. It is considered the church's flagship provider of higher education in India. It is a part of the Seventh-day Adventist education system, the world's second largest Christian school system.

== History ==
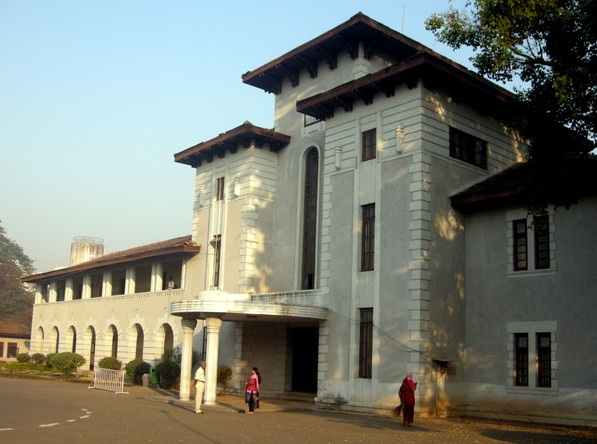
Spicer Adventist University Administration Building

Founded as the South India Training School in Coimbatore, India, Spicer Memorial College began its journey with a modest start.

Under the leadership of Gentry G. Lowry, the institution underwent significant growth and development, including a relocation to Bangalore in 1918. It was during this period that the institution was renamed Spicer College in honor of William A. Spicer, a missionary and former General Conference president, who served in India and contributed significantly to global mission efforts.

Lowry's vision extended beyond mere training for Bible workers and literature evangelists. He advocated for Spicer College's transformation into a senior college, aligning with Spicer's emphasis on advancing indigenous talent in missionary work. Despite Lowry's sudden demise in 1942, his vision persisted, leading to the college's elevation to senior college status in 1946.

It was known as Spicer Memorial College until 2014. The college was granted University status by the Legislative Assembly of Maharashtra on 16 June 2014.

== Campus ==
Some of the major structures in the campus include the administrative building, which houses offices and classrooms. There are separate buildings for the library, the sciences, education, religion, agriculture, the cafeteria, boarders, the college press, industrial arts, Spicer Memorial College Higher Secondary School, Spicer Products and Services.

== Student life ==
The majority of the student body are members of the Seventh-day Adventist Church, and weekly church services are held at the campus church with regular Sabbath observance starting from the time of sunset on Friday to the sunset on Saturday. Friday evening vespers services (AYS) are held weekly as are Religion & Theology Forums. Basketball and football are the major sports on campus.

The college also hosts a local research centre of the Ellen G. White Estate.

The college celebrated a centenary from 28 January – 1 February 2015.

== Controversy ==
In 2018, a case was filed against the vice chancellor and two officials of the university for allegedly forging their PhD certificates.

In February 2019, the Maharashtra state cabinet ordered action against the university for alleged irregularities by its officials in connection with the admission process.

== See also ==
- List of educational institutions in Pune
- List of Seventh-day Adventist colleges and universities
- List of universities in India
