= Jeffrey Blume =

American scientist

Jeffrey D. Blume
- Blume in 2026
- Education: Johns Hopkins University (PhD)
- Awards: AAAS Fellow; ASA Fellow
- Scientific career
- Fields: Data science Biostatistics
- Workplaces: University of Virginia; Vanderbilt University; Brown University
- Website: datascience.virginia.edu/people/jeffrey-blume

Jeffrey D. Blume is an American data scientist and biostatistician. Since 2026 he has been the dean of the University of Virginia School of Data Science.

== Education ==
Blume earned his Ph.D. in biostatistics from Johns Hopkins University after receiving a bachelor's degree in statistics from the University at Buffalo.

== Career ==
Blume served at Brown University as Deputy Director of the Biostatistics and Data Management Center associated with the American College of Radiology Imaging Network. In this role he did clinical research to evaluate medical imaging technology and also he helped establish their master of public health program. Following that, Blume served as Director of Graduate Studies at Vanderbilt University where he established a Ph.D. program in biostatistics. He established the masters degree program for the Vanderbilt Data Science Institute in 2018.

Blume joined the University of Virginia School of Data Science with an endowed appointment as Quantitative Foundation Associate Dean. In 2026 following the passing of Dean Philip Bourne, Blume became the second dean of the school.

== Awards and honors ==
In 2019, Blume was appointed as the 2019 Spinoza Chair in Medicine at the University of Amsterdam.

In 2021, Blume was elected both as a Fellow of the American Statistical Association and a Fellow of the American Association for the Advancement of Science.

== Select works ==
- Blume, Jeffrey D. (15 September 2002). "Likelihood methods for measuring statistical evidence". Statistics in Medicine. 21 (17): 2563–2599. doi:10.1002/SIM.1216.
- Fletcher Mercaldo, Sarah; Blume, Jeffrey D (1 April 2020). "Missing data and prediction: the pattern submodel". Biostatistics. 21 (2): 236–252. doi:10.1093/BIOSTATISTICS/KXY040. PMC 7868046.
- Blume, Jeffrey D.; Greevy, Robert A.; Welty, Valerie F.; Smith, Jeffrey R.; Dupont, William D. (29 March 2019). "An Introduction to Second-Generation p -Values". The American Statistician. 73 (sup1): 157–167. doi:10.1080/00031305.2018.1537893.
