= Yashwantrao Chavan Natya Gruha =

Theater and exhibition hall in Pune, India

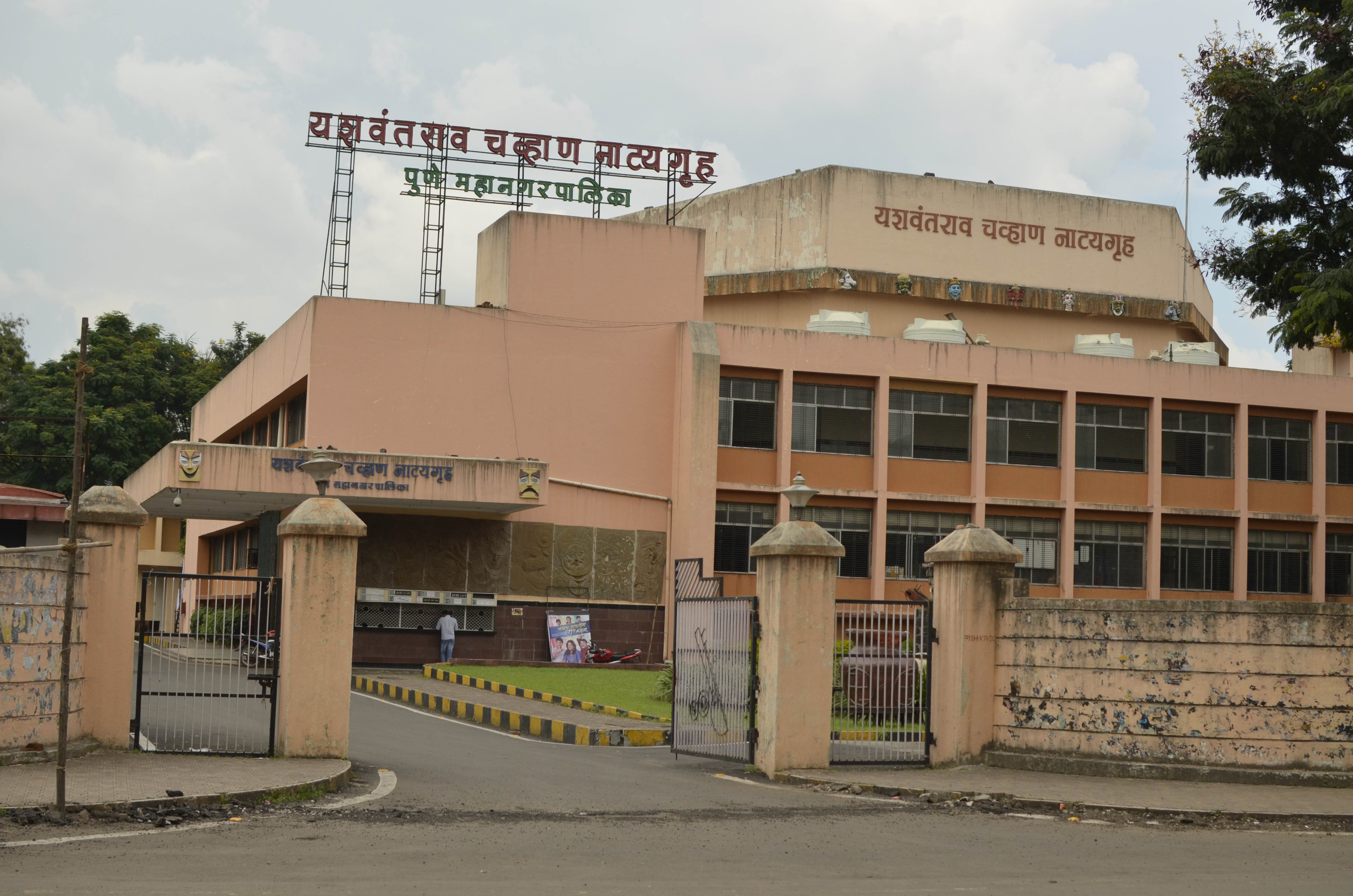
- Interactive map of Yashwantrao Chavan Natya Gruha
- Address: Kothrud; Pune; India
- Owner: Pune Municipal Corporation
- Operator: Pune Municipal Corporation
- Capacity: 900
- Current use: Theatre

Construction
- Opened: 2000
- Years active: 2000 - Present

Yashwantrao Chavan Natya Gruha is a theatre auditorium and exhibition hall located in Kothrud, Pune. The theater is named after first Chief Minister of Maharashtra after the division of Bombay State and the fifth Deputy Prime Minister of India Yashwantrao Chavan. It is run by Pune Municipal Corporation and was established in 2000 with the capacity of 900 persons with a parking facilities of 60 four-wheelers and 125 two-wheelers.
