= MIT University, Meghalaya =

Private university in Shillong, Meghalaya, India

- Motto: Sustainability Centered University
- Type: Private university
- Established: 2011
- Affiliations: UGC
- Chancellor: Dr. Sanjay G. Dhande
- Vice-Chancellor: Dr. Malhar Pangrikar
- Students: [Specify number of students, if available]
- Location: Shillong, Meghalaya, 793012, India
- Campus: Urban
- Website: www.mituniversityindia.edu.in

MIT University of Meghalaya (formerly known as University of Technology and Management, Shillong) is a private university established in 2011, in accordance with Section 3 of the UGC Act. The university is located in Shillong, the state capital of Meghalaya, within the union of India. It is the first Indian university to introduce cloud computing engineering as a field of study, in collaboration with IBM.

MIT University of Meghalaya is part of the MIT Group of Institutions.

== Academics ==
It offers specialised programmes in travel, tourism, finance, retail, engineering, and technology sectors. The academic courses at MIT University, Shillong, include B. Des in Smart Product Design, UIUX, Animation & Game Design, Graphics Design, BBA in Digital Marketing, Hospitality Travel and Tourism, Finance, Marketing and Retail and B.Tech in Computer Engineering and Oil and Gas Informatics, BA in English, Political Science, Economics, Khasi & Sociology. Post Graduate course such as MBA in Marketing, Finance, Human Resource, M. Des in UIUX, Graphic Design.

== Former Pro Vice Chancellors ==
- Dr. S.N Suri (2010-2013)
- Professor Avinash Singh (2013-2014)
- Dr. Mukesh Saxena (2014–2017)
- Dr. Debmalya Bhattacharya (2017– 2022)
