= MIT Group of Institutions =

The MIT Group of Institutions is a nonprofit group of educational institutions operated by the Maharashtra Academy of Engineering and Educational Research.

It is unrelated to Massachusetts Institute of Technology (MIT) located in the United States.

== Universities ==
It operates a number of universities and schools including:

- MIT World Peace University (MIT-WPU)
- MIT Art, Design and Technology University (MIT-ADT)
- Avantika University
- Maharashtra Institute of Medical Education and Research
- MIT University, Meghalaya
- MIT Vishwaprayag University, Solapur (MITVPU)

As of 2019, its three flagship design and engineering schools generated more than 50% of its revenues. They are:

- the MIT Institute of Design, part of MIT-ADT
- MIT Pune, part of MIT-WPU
- MIT College of Engineering, part of MIT-WPU

== Maeer Institutes ==
=== Engineering Institutes ===
- Maharashtra Institute of Technology (MIT) Engineering College, Pune – Established in 1983
- MIT Polytechnic, Pune – Established in 1996
- Maharashtra Academy of Engineering (MAE) Engineering College, Alandi, Pune – Established in 1999
- MIT College of Engineering (MITCOE), Pune – Established in 2001
- Maharashtra Academy of Naval Education and Training (MANET), Pune – Established in 2001
- MIT CAD CAM CAE Training and Design Center, Pune
- MIT College of Food Technology (MITCFT), Rajbaug, Loni Kalbhor, Pune – Established in 2006
- MIT B Tech Study Center (YCMOU), Pune – Established in 2005
- MIT School of Advanced Science & Information Technology (MITSASIT), Pune
- MIT College of Railway Engineering and Research (MITCORER), Barshi, Solapur

=== Management Institutes ===
- MIT School of Management (MITSOM), Pune – Established in 1987
- MITSOM – Autonomous Management Programs, Pune – Established in 1987
- MITSOM College – UG Management Courses, Pune – Established in 2004
- MIT College of Insurance (MITCOI), Pune – Established in 2001
- MIT School of Government (MITSOG), Pune – Established in 2005
- MIT School of Business (MITSOB), Pune – Established in 2005
- MIT College of Management (MITCOM) – Established in 2007
- MIT School of Retail Management (MITSRM), Pune – Established in 2007
- MIT College of Commerce & Management Studies, Latur – Established in 2007
- MIT School of Telecom and Management Studies (MITSOT), Pune – Established in 2007

=== Pharmacy Institutes ===
- Maharashtra Institute of Pharmacy (MIP), Pune – Established in 1997

=== Distance Education ===
- MIT School of Distance Education (MITSDE), Pune – Established in 2005

=== Medical Institutes ===
- Maharashtra Institute of Medical Science and Research, Latur (MIMSR) – Established in 1990
- MIMSR – D.M.L.T. Courses, Latur – Established in 2004
- Maharashtra Institute of Nursing Sciences – B.Sc. Nursing College, Latur – Established in 2005
- Maharashtra Institute of Physiotherapy, Latur – Established in 2005
- Maharashtra Institute of Nursing (GNM), Latur – Established in 1999
- Maharashtra Institute of Dental Science and Research (MIDSR), Latur – Established in 2006
- Maharashtra Institute of Medical Education and Research (MIMER), Talegaon Dabhade, Pune – Established in 1995
- Maharashtra Institute of Physiotherapy, Talegaon Dabhade, Pune – Established in 2006
- MIMER – D.M.L.T. Courses, Talegaon, Pune – Established in 2006
- MIMER – CPS (PGD Courses), Talegaon, Pune

=== B.Ed. & D.Ed. Colleges ===
- MIT B.Ed. College, Pune – Established in 2007
- MIT B.Ed. College, Latur – Established in 2007
- MIT B.Ed. College, Rajbaug, Loni, Pune – Established in 2007
- MIT B.Ed. College, Ambajogai, Dist. Beed – Established in 2007
- MIT D.Ed. College, Ambajogai, Dist. Beed – Established in 2007
- MIT D.Ed. College, Rameshwar – Established in 2007
- MIT D.Ed. College, Pune – Established in 2007

=== Other Institutes ===
- MIT College of Arts, Commerce & Science, Pune – Established in 2004
- MIT College of Arts, Commerce & Science, Alandi – Established in 2007
- MIT College of Science and Computer Studies, Latur – Established in 2006
- MIT School of Foreign Languages (MITSFL), Pune – Established in 2004
- MIT Career Guidance Center (MIT CGC), Pune – Established in 2005
- MIT Lighting Research Academy (MITLRA), Pune
- MIT Institute of Design, Rajbaug, Loni Kalbhor, Pune

=== World Peace Centre ===
- UNESCO Chair for Human Rights, Democracy, Peace & Tolerance
