= Trinity Academy of Engineering =

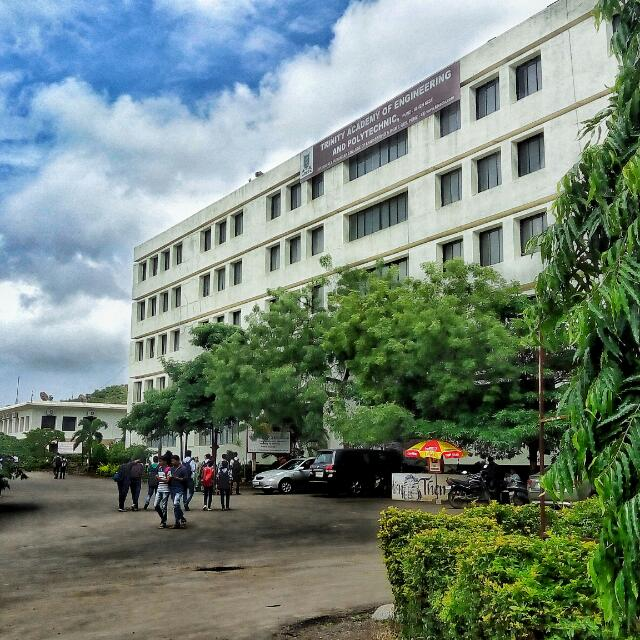
- Type: Private
- Established: 2009
- Affiliations: Savitribai Phule Pune University
- Principal: Dr.R.J.Patil
- Location: Pune, Maharashtra, India
- Campus: 120 acres
- Website: tae.kjei.edu.in

The Trinity Academy of Engineering is a technical education institute in the city of Pune, India. The institute is affiliated with the University of Pune and managed by the KJ's Educational Institutes (KJEI). It has been accredited by the National Board of Accreditation and recognized by the All India Council for Technical Education (AICTE). The institute has also been awarded an "A" Grade by the National Assessment and Accreditation Council (NAAC) and Directorate of Technical Education, Maharashtra.

== Campus ==
The college has about 200 faculty members, 67 laboratories, 1 central library and 100 administrative and support staff.

Spread over an area of 110 acres (450,000 m^{2}), the academic area consists of five major buildings. The campus has three major canteens, 4 coffee and snack outlets that remain open during the college hours, and an auditorium with ceiling fans.

The hostel is equipped with a mess facility for students and also has wifi. It is located in the campus.

== Courses ==
The college offers the following graduate and postgraduate courses:
B.E. M.E.& MCA Degree course:

- Civil Engineering (60 seats)
- Computer Engineering(60 seats)
- Electronics and Communication Engineering(60 seats)
- Mechanical Engineering (60seats)
- Information Technology (60seats)
- MCA (60seats)
- Construction management (24 seats)
- CAD-CAM (24 seats)
