= Symbiosis Skills and Professional University =

University in Maharashtra, India

- Former names: Symbiosis Skills and Open University
- Type: Private
- Established: 2017
- Chancellor: S. B. Mujumdar
- Vice-Chancellor: Dr. Rajesh Ingle
- Location: adjoining mumbai pune express-way, village kiwale, Pune, Maharashtra, India
- Campus: urban
- Website: sspu.ac.in

Symbiosis Skills and Professional University (formerly Symbiosis Skills and Open University) Pune, Maharashtra, India, is India's highest-ranked university on Government of India's National Institutional Ranking Framework in the Skills University category. Established by the Symbiosis Open Education Society, Symbiosis Skills and Professional University is the first skill-building and development university in the state of Maharashtra. On May 03, 2017, the state passed a legislation bill to enact this university.

The university offers diplomas, degrees and certificates in fields such as Automobile, Construction, Mechatronics, Software engineering, Computer science, IT, Beauty and Wellness, Data Science, Retail, Logistics and Ports as well as Architecture. The main objective of this university is to create industry-ready youth, who can work efficiently and effectively in organizations. Furthermore, SSPU has also built strong ties with many leading organizations for joint-curricula development. Some of the famous industry partners of this university are Shoppers Stop, Daikin, LSC and Enrich.

Symbiosis Skills and Professional University, Pune has the following schools:

- School of Automobile Engineering
- School of Construction Engineering and Infrastructure Management
- School of Mechatronics Engineering
- School of Data Science
- School of Architecture, Urban Development and Planning
- School of Ports, Terminal Management and Logistics
- School of Retail Management
- School of Beauty and Wellness
- School of Interdisciplinary Science

== Sources ==
- "Maha likely to get five private universities offering unique courses". Hindustan Times. 1 April 2017.
- "Maharashtra to get its second Skill Development & Open University soon". Daily News & Analysis. 26 March 2017.
- "More choice, better facilities for students". Ardhra Nair. The Times of India. 9 April 2017.
- "Private University Maharashtra". University Grants Commission (India).
