= Marathwada Mitra Mandal's College of Engineering =

Private college in Pune, Maharashtra, India

Coordinates: 18.490621°N 73.809553°E

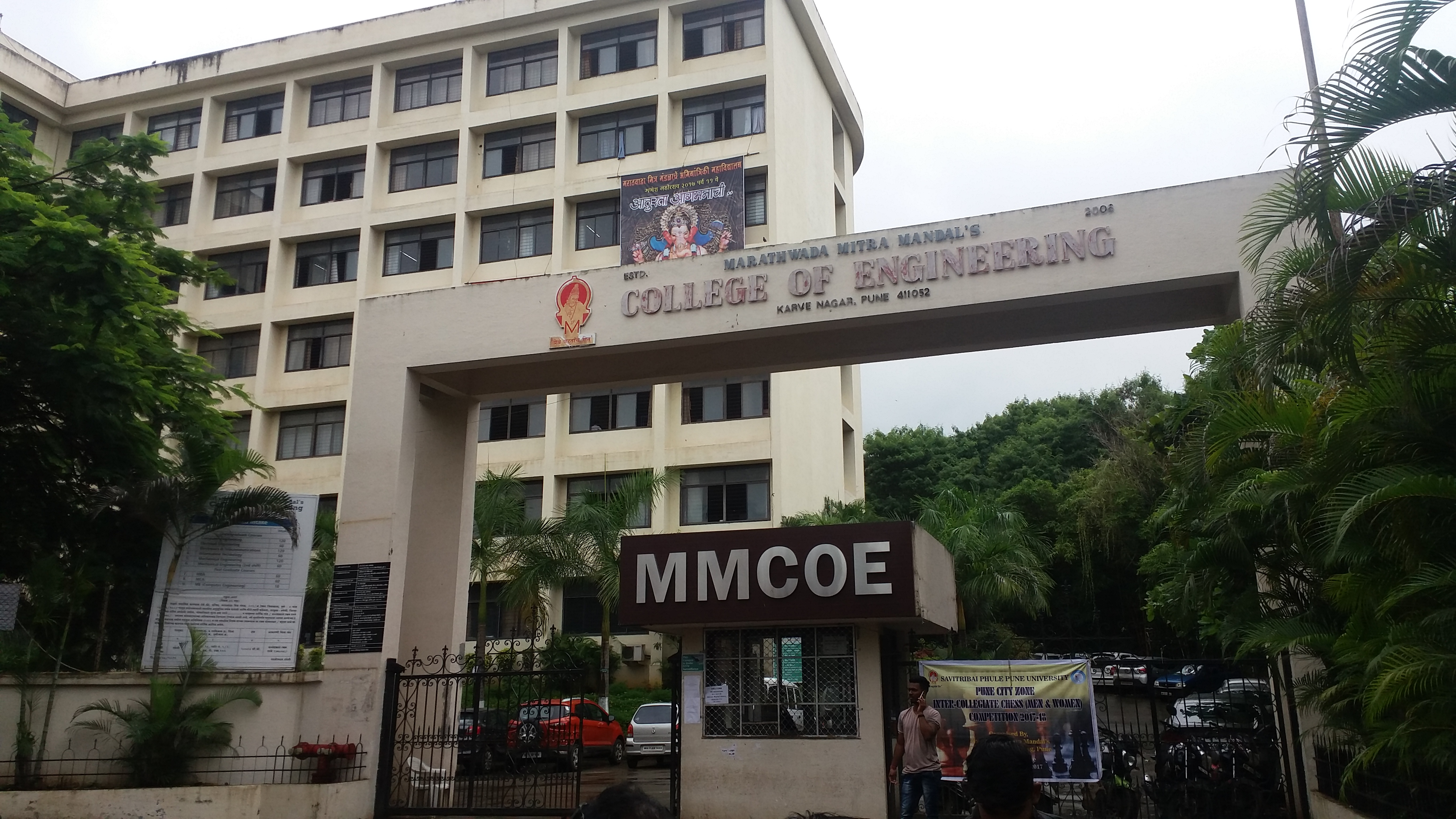
- Marathwada Mitra Mandal's College of Engineering
- Motto: येथे बहुतांचे हित |
- Type: Private Engineering Co-ed
- Established: 2006
- Affiliations: Pune University
- Principal: Dr. Sachin R. Sakhare
- Faculty: 200
- Administrative staff: 60
- Students: 2000
- Location: Sr.No. 18, Plot No. 5/3, CTS No.205, Behind Vandevi Temple, Karvenagar, Pune - 411052, Pune, Maharashtra, India
- Website: http://www.mmcoe.edu.in

The trust "Marathwada Mitra Mandal, Pune" was established in 1967 by Hon. Late Shri. Shankarraoji Chavan, Former Home Minister, Govt. of India as the "Founder President". The trust had started its activity with the objective of providing hostel or similar accommodation in Pune to the students. This trust is established through the inspiration of socially and educationally charged personalities, with motto "Yethe Bahutanche Hit" (Welfare of Masses).

It is centrally located in the heart of Karvenagar, Pune, recognized as the Best College by Savitribai Phule Pune University (SPPU). Marathwada Mitra Mandal’s College of Engineering (MMCOE), Pune, stands as a prestigious institution committed to academic excellence and societal impact. Established in 2006, the institute upholds its motto, “Welfare of the Masses,” while delivering quality education aligned with Outcome-Based Education (OBE) and the New Education Policy (NEP) 2020 .The institute is NAAC A++ and NBA accredited.

Mass education, co-education and dedication towards overall development of the region are the watchwords of the trust. At present the trust has four educational campuses at Deccan, Karvenagar, Lohagaon and Kalewadi.

The college located in Pune, Karvenagar Maharashtra. The college offers Bachelors in Engineering (B.E) in the branch of Computer, Electrical, Electronics and Telecommunication, Information Technology and Mechanical Engineering and Artificial Intelligence. The college also provides Masters in Business Management (MBA) and Computer Engineering.!.

== Introduction ==
MMCOE is affiliated to Savitribai Phule Pune University accredited with 'A' grade by NAAC and recognized by DTE Maharashtra. and approved by AICTE New Delhi. MMCOE has been recognised as the BEST COLLEGE-2019 by SPPU. MMCOE is one feather in the cap of Marathwada Mitra Mandal Pune, from the academic year 2006 - 2007. It offers five engineering programmes (Computer, Electrical, E&TC, Information Technology, Mechanical and Artificial Intelligence) and two P.G programmes MBA and ME(Computer Engineering). It houses 2000+ students and 200 staff members. Along with the focus on core academics, college also takes care of overall personality development of the students. The college has an active robotics cell, NCC, Training and Placement cell etc. The students are motivated to actively participate in co-curricular and extra-curricular activities. They have brought many laurels to the Institute in the events such as Vinodottam Karandak, Firodiya Karandak, Zest, Dexterity etc. Two departments Electrical Engineering & Mechanical Engineering Departments of MMCOE got accredited by National Board of Accreditation (NBA)

== Courses offered ==
- Computer Engineering
- Mechanical Engineering
- Information Technology
- Electronics and Telecommunication
- Electrical Engineering
- Artificial Intelligence
- Master of Business Administration (MBA)
- Master in Computer Engineering

== Centre of Excellence ==
- Center of Excellence in High Performance Computing

HPC is a multidisciplinary field, combining digital electronics, computer architecture, system software, programming languages, algorithms and computational techniques in parallel computing environments to model complex systems or to control transactional computing services. HPC was most frequently associated with scientific research; however, HPC has been applied recently to business, government and military uses of cluster-based computing strategies, such as data warehouses transaction processing, utility computing.

- Center of Excellence in Automation & Robotics (COEA&R)

A center of excellence (COE) is a laboratory or shared facility that provides training/ support, provides platform for students and researchers to do their research work. Center of Excellence in Automation and Robotics in Department of Mechanical Engineering is a resource formed to serve for academics and industry persons in the field of Automation and Robotics. The center's aim is to create technically sophisticated manpower for automation and robotics research, including inter-disciplinary network. In addition to the research activities, COEA&R is also involved in developing technologies that can be commercially availed by the industries.

- Center of Excellence in Advanced embedded Systems and Signal Processing

To provide the students with State-of-Art training environment so that E&TC graduates will be able to provide solutions to industry relevant problems in Embedded Systems and Signal Processing domain

- Center of Excellence in Automation & Control

Projects on conventional and digital automation need to involve people from discipline like Computer, Electrical, Mechanical, Agriculture and Electronics. These projects include hardware and software development, training curriculum etc.

- Center of Excellence in Computational Intelligence

Computational Intelligence is the ability of a computer to learn a specific task from data or experimental observation. Generally, computational intelligence is a set of nature-inspired computational methodologies and approaches to address complex real-world problems to which mathematical or traditional modeling can be useless for a few reasons: the processes might be too complex for mathematical reasoning, it might contain some uncertainties during the process, or the process might simply be stochastic in nature.

== Alumni ==
- Akshayraj Kore
