= MIT Art, Design and Technology University =

Private university in Maharashtra, India

Coordinates: 18.49259°N 74.025483°E

- The MIT building in Pune
- Other name: MIT-ADT University
- Type: Autonomous private university
- Established: 2015; 11 years ago
- Founder: Dr. Vishwanath D. Karad
- Accreditation: NAAC 'A'; CGPA 3.11
- President: Dr. Vishwanath D. Karad
- Vice-Chancellor: Dr. Rajesh Siddavatam
- Location: MIT Art, Design and Technology University, Rajbaugh Loni Kalbhor, Solapur Highway, Near Bharat Petrol Pump Loni Kalbhor Railway Station, Pune - 412201, Maharashtra, India
- Campus: 85 Acre
- Website: www.mituniversity.ac.in

The MIT Art, Design and Technology University (MIT-ADT) established in 2015, is an autonomous private university in Rajbaug Loni Kalbhor, Pune, Maharashtra, India. It is part of the MIT Group of Institutions.

== History ==
The MIT Group of Institutions established a campus in Rajbaug Loni Kalbhor in 2004. The campus was incorporated as a distinct university, MIT-ADT, in June 2016, under the provisions of the MIT Art, Design and Technology University Act, 2015.

== Academics ==
The institute offers graduate and postgraduate level courses, the Graduate Diploma Program (GDP) Postgraduate Diploma Program (PGDP).

== Honors ==
- UGC recognized university. MIT ADT Art Design & Technology University has been established by an Act of State Legislature of Maharashtra as a Private University and is empowered to award degrees as specified under section 22 of the UGC Act through its main campus at regular mode with the approval of statutory bodies/councils, wherever its required.
- NAAC accredited 'A' CGPA 3.11 on four-point scale
- “The Best University Campus” at the 10th National Education Excellence awards 2017 by ASSOCHAM.

== Institutes ==
- MIT School Of Architecture
- MIT School Of Fine Arts & Applied Arts
- MIT Vishwashanti Sangeet Kala Academy
- MIT School of Film and Theatre
- MIT School of Broadcasting and Journalism
- MIT College of Management
- Center of Distance and Online Education
- MIT Institute of Design
- MIT School of Law
- Maharashtra Academy of Naval Education Training
- MIT School of Computing
- MIT School of Engineering and Science
- MIT School of Bioengineering Science and Research
- MIT School of Food Technology
- MIT School of Education and Research
- MIT School of Vedic Science
- MIT School of Humanities
- MIT School of Indian Civil Services
