= MIT World Peace University =

Private university in Pune, India

- Former name: MIT Group of Institutes
- Motto: विश्वशान्तिर्ध्रुवम ध्रुवा
- Type: Private institution
- Established: 2017
- Parent institution: MIT Group of Institutions
- Accreditation: UGC BCI PCI DSIR
- Chairman: Dr. Vishwanath D. Karad
- President: (Executive President) Rahul V. Karad
- Vice-Chancellor: Dr. R. M. Chitnis
- Location: Pune, Maharashtra, India
- Colors: Blue, Dark Magenta, Cyan-green & Orange
- Website: mitwpu.edu.in

Maharashtra Institute of Technology World Peace University,(MIT-WPU) is a private university located in Kothrud, Pune, India. It is a part of the MIT Group of Institutions.

It is officially named Vishwanath Karad MIT World Peace University. It was established under the Government of Maharashtra Act No. XXXV 2017 and recognized by the University Grants Commission.

== History ==
The university was formerly known as the Maharashtra Institute of Technology which was established in 1983 as the first college of the MAEER group of institutions, and was one of the first private engineering colleges in Maharastra. MAEER was affiliated with Savitribai Phule Pune University (SPPU), which turned into MIT World Peace University, a private university under the guidance of Revered Prof (Dr.) Vishwanath D Karad.

== Ranking ==
University and college rankings

Engineering – India
- NIRF (2024): 101-150

Pharmacy – India
- NIRF (2024): 72

The National Institutional Ranking Framework (NIRF) ranked it in 101-150 band among engineering colleges in 2024.

The National Institutional Ranking Framework (NIRF) ranked it 72 among Pharmacy colleges in India in 2024.

== Departments ==
Maharashtra Institute of Technology - World Peace University's (MIT-WPU) Departments include:

=== Faculty of Engineering and Technology ===
- School of Engineering and Technology
1. Department of Bioengineering
2. Department of Civil Engineering
3. Department of Mechanical Engineering
4. Department of Chemical Engineering
5. Department of Material Science Engineering
6. Department of Electrical and Electronics Engineering
7. Department of Petroleum Engineering
8. Department of Polytechnic
- School of Computer Engineering and Technology
1. Department of Computer Engineering and Technology
2. Department of Computer Science and Applications

=== Faculty of Business and Leadership ===
- Ramcharan School of Leadership
- School of Business
1. Department of Business
2. Department of Hospitality Management
- School of Economics & Commerce
1. Department of Commerce & Accounting
2. Department of Economics & Public Policy
3. Department of Public Policy
4. Department of Sustainability studies
- School of Government

=== Faculty of Science & Health Science ===
- School of Health Science & Technology
1. Department of Pharmaceutical Sciences
2. Department of Public Health
3. Department of Clinical Sciences
4. Department of Wellness & Yogic science
- School of Science & Environmental Studies
1. Department of Mathematics and Statistics
2. Department of Biosciences and Technology
3. Department of Physics
4. Department of Chemistry
5. Department of Environmental Studies

=== Faculty of Arts, Design and Humanities ===
- School of Design
1. Department of Design
2. Department of Visual Arts
- School of Liberal Arts
1. Department of Liberal Arts
2. Department of Education
3. Department of Photography
4. Department of Media and Communication
5. Department of Peace Studies
- School of Law
- School of Consciousness

== Student life ==
MITWPU's Cultural Club also engages in activities like drama, literary arts and music as well as sports and other activities are very important in student life. MITCOE-ts also have been participating in Firodiya Karandak an inter-collegiate competition where students showcase their talents through plays. MITWPU regularly participate in linguistic and play competitions like Purshottam Karandak and Firodia Karandak and was First Runner Up in 2024 with play "Rehnuma" and First Runner Up in 2026 with play "Rapta".MITCOE remained in the top three ranks of Purshottam karandak and was the winner of its 2011 edition. And also won prestigious Sawai Karandak.

Student clubs include:

- Innovation Hub
- Adaptiv: Interdisciplinary Biosciences Hub with their own Podcast
- Cosmos Astronomy Club
- Team Piranha Racing
- IEEE student branch
- Robotics Club
- Spandan (magazine club)
- MIT CREON (art and literary club)
- Club Felix
- Ninox Nature Club: Club for Nature, Sustainibility and Conservation
- Squad-Up: Club for gaming, Esports and game development.Instagram
- Acceleracers
- Shutterbugs: club for photography, videography and graphic design
- Squad-Up: Club for gaming, Esports and Game development.Instagram
- Students are also involved in activities with external bodies including SAE International, ISTE, IETE, and CSI.

MITCOE regularly takes part in an international robotics event called ROBOCON hosted by MIT in association with Asia Pacific Broadcasting Union (ABU). The event gets televised on Doordarshan (Prasarbharati) and colleges from 16 nations send robotics teams to take part in this competition. In 2010 a specially dedicated lab for Robocon have been added to the MITCOE. In 2012 MIT college of engineering Robocon team was ranked 6th & in 2013, 14th among 80 engineering colleges including IIT's and NIT's nationwide.

The technical event of MITCOE is called TESLA, which includes competitions, workshops and seminars. It was formerly known as Pinnacle and is scheduled in September each year. Participants from many colleges of India come to take part in this technical event.

== See also ==
- List of educational institutions in Pune
