= Indian Institute of Aeronautical Engineering & Information Technology =

Private college in Pune, India

Indian Institute for Aeronautical Engineering & Information Technology
- Motto: Gateway to Excellence
- Type: Private
- Established: 2001
- Location: Pune, Maharashtra, India
- Website: iiaeit.org

Indian Institute for Aeronautical Engineering & Information Technology (IIAEIT) is an aerospace engineering college in Pune, India. It also offers mechanical engineering and other technology related courses. It is known for its full-time face to face B.Tech Aerospace Engineering course (BTAE) which is jointly launched by D.Y Patil University and Aeronautical Engineering and Research Organisation (AERO).

It is a frontline training institute in the engineering disciplines, especially in the field of aeronautics. With a first rated faculty, backed by fully furnished laboratories, the institute is considered as one of the best in Pune, India.

IIAEIT has established itself into a chief forefront Institution with excellent infrastructure over the last twelve years. Apart from training students for the professional industries, the institution also prepares Aerospace students to master their engineering.

== History ==
=== AERO ===
Aeronautical Engineering and Research Organisation (AERO) is a constituent part of Shastri Group of Institutes. It popularizes education, research and development by collaborating with several Industries and educational institutions in all fields of aviation in India as well as abroad. AERO offers B.Tech aerospace engineering course which is accomplished face-to-face.

=== Shastri campus ===
Shastri Group of Institutes was founded in Pune by Anshul Sharma in the year 2001. The group originated by preparing students for the examinations conducted by professional institutes. With its front head flagship named Indian Institute for Aeronautical Engineering and Information Technology SGI is a part of PSD Shastri Educational Foundation which is engaged in several social services and objectives. It is mentored by an Advisory Board whose members are from Aviation, Services, Industries, Business and Educational fields.

== Aerospace course ==
Aerospace Engineering deals with the design, development, and manufacturing of flying machines and launch vehicles. Aerospace engineering is a combination of aeronautical engineering and astronautical engineering. It is the primary field of engineering concerned with the development of Aircraft and Spacecraft. In the Indian Context previously only the Aeronautical Engineering discipline was available however with increased demand in the aviation sector and growing research and development the demand for Aerospace Engineers has increased across the globe.

The curriculum includes a total of 19 laboratory courses. A one-year project assessment in the seventh semester and eight elective courses in the final semester, industry visit in two semesters and professional training is must for all admitted students. The course offers 120 seats per centre.

Presently fresh admissions are kept on hold till further orders by the court.

== Credit scheme ==
The total percentage of marks are calculated for each semester by summing the products of marks obtained in each subject and its respective credits and then dividing it by the total credits.

Cumulative Grade Point Average (CGPA)

$$CGPA \,\! = {\sum_{i=1}^N C_i . {GP}_i \over \sum_{i=1}^N C_i}$$

where:

- $N$ is the number of courses,
- $C_i$ is credits of the $i^{th}$ course,
- ${GP}_i$ is grade points for the $i^{th}$ course.
