= Vetal Hill =

Hill in Pune, India

Coordinates: 18°31′31″N 73°48′55″E

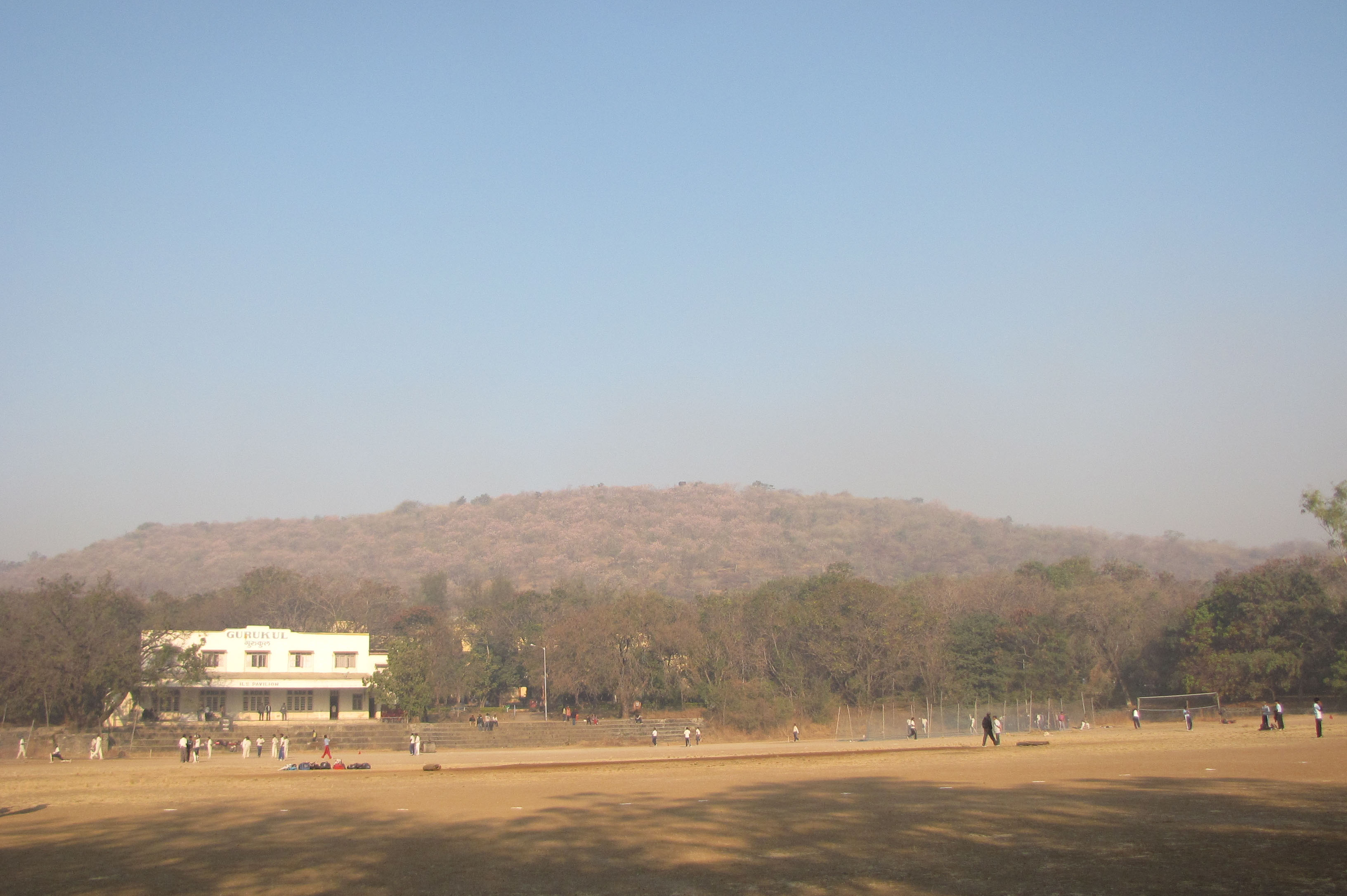
- Vetal Hill

Highest point
- Elevation: 800 m (2,600 ft)

Geography
- Location within Maharashtra Location within India
- Location: Pune, Maharashtra, India
- Parent range: Western Ghats

Vetal Hill (Marathi: वेताळ टेकडी ) is a prominent hill in the city limits of Pune, India. The hill is the highest point within the city limits, with an elevation of 800 meters (2,600 ft). The temple of Vetala is located on the top of the hill from which the hill derives its name. The Indian Forest Department maintains an observation deck near the temple. The hill is also known by its Marathi name, Vetal Tekdi.

== Location and physiography ==
Vetal Hill is a part of Bhamburda Van Vihar located on the western side of Pune Municipal Corporation within the city limits. Vetal Tekdi is prominent and is visible from Pashan, Panchavati, Chatturshrungi and other parts of the city. It has two spurs, Fergusson College Hill and Chatturshrungi Hill. The geographical area is 180 30’ to 180 32’ N and 730 49’ to 730 52’ E covering an area of 10.5 square kilometres (4.1 mi^{2}).

It runs North-South with some spurs running perpendicular to this hill. Vetal hill runs across areas like MIT College, SNDT Women's University, ILS Law College, Gokhale Nagar, Symbiosis Society and Chatturshrungi.

There is one access road leading up the hill from the south. This can be used to access the Automotive Research Association of India campus located on the hill. There is a public parking lot also located along this road, however access is restricted to this between 8:30 am and 5:30 pm.

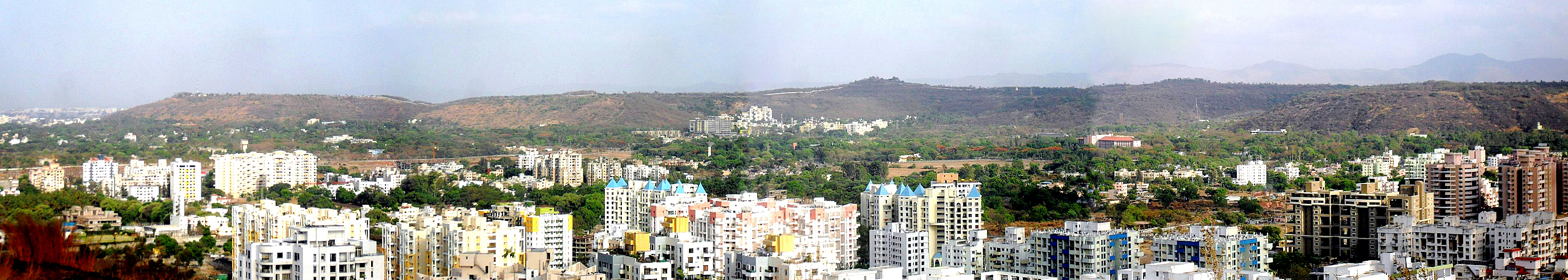
Vetal Hill Panorama, the summit is in the centre.

== Climate ==
A small forest fire on a hot summer day in Vetal Tekdi

Summers are hot and dry on the hill. The summit is difficult to climb during the monsoon season and is usually foggy. Winter days are also cool and foggy. Sunrise and sunset at Vetal Hill attracts many photographers.

The area shares almost same climatic conditions as that of Pune.

== Flora and Fauna ==
The forest type in this area is dry-deciduous as that of hills around Pune. Medium-sized trees along with shrubs constitute majority of the vegetation. Diversity of herbaceous species is at its peak in monsoon months. Some parasites like Dendropthoe and Striga are also reported in the area. One important characteristic of the area is total absent of epiphytic species. Detailed Floristic Study of Vetal Hill was carried out by V. N. Joshi and M. S. Kumbhojakar of Agharkar Research Institute, Pune in 1997. They enumerated occurrence of 416 species of angiosperms belonging to 101 families, 2 pteridophytes and one Bryophyte.

Much before Joshi and Kumbhojkar’s work, ecological survey of the hill was conducted by Ezekiel around 1917-1918. Joshi, Kumbhojkar and Kulkarni in their work on changing floristic pattern of Vetal hill (1992) reported absence of 30 species which were reported by Ezekiel.

The dominant plant community in the area is Boswellia serrata-Anogeissus latifolia. Other dominant members of this area are Dalbergia lanceolaria, Acacia chundra, Dolichandrone falcata, Albizzia procera, Capparis grandis. Some herbaceous and shrubby weeds which are now naturalized in the area include Tridax procumbens, Lagascea mollis, Cassia uniflora, Lantana camara. Plantation of some exotic species like Gliricidia sepium, Leucaena leucocephala has been undertaken by forest department. Dalbergia melanoxylon is one interesting example for spread of exotic species. This species was planted by Britishers in Pune University area. This species was totally absent on other areas of Pune. Recently however, the species is observed to be spreading in and around the area of the Vetal Hill, and is on the verge of becoming dominant species there.

The area is important on account of the occurrence of some important endemic species. Some examples of the endemic species found here are Jatropha nana, Cissus woodrowii, Mussanda laxa, Indoneesiella echioides, etc.

=== Birds ===
Vetal Hill supports a variety of bird species associated with its woodland, grassland and wetland habitats. Approximately 280 species of birds have been recorded at the Vetal Tekdi eBird hotspot. Birds recorded at the hill include the common peafowl, flycatchers, common wood-shrike, Rufous treepie and Spotted dove. The area also attracts seasonal visitors and migratory birds.

Resident species recorded at the hill include the Spotted owlet, Yellow-crowned woodpecker, Eurasian hoopoe, Indian nightjar, White-eyed buzzard, Indian silverbill, Little grebe and Yellow-wattled lapwing. Winter visitors include the Desert wheatear, Blue rock thrush, Asian brown flycatcher, Blyth's reed warbler, Green sandpiper and Booted eagle. Passage migrants recorded in the area include the European honey-buzzard and Lesser cuckoo.

Birdwatching events held at Vetal Hill have documented several uncommon and migratory species. The 2024 Vetal Tekdi Birding Marathon recorded 140 species, including the Eurasian wryneck, Grey-necked bunting and Taiga flycatcher. The 2025 edition recorded 164 species, including the Rusty-tailed flycatcher, Western yellow wagtail, Blue-cheeked bee-eater and Montagu's harrier.

=== Other wildlife ===
Apart from birds, Vetal Tekdi and its surrounding hill habitats support several other forms of wildlife. Camera-trap surveys have documented the presence of the Jungle cat at Vetal Tekdi, including a juvenile, indicating that the area may provide habitat for the species. Other animals recorded during nature walks and wildlife observations include the Indian grey mongoose and Indian hare. Reptiles recorded at the hill include the Checkered keelback.

== Current status ==
During the last few years the area has been subjected to various stresses of anthropogenic activities. Plantation of exotic species by forest department, urban development, tree cutting are few of them. Many afforestation programs have been undertaken either by Pune Municipal Corporation or by state forest Department have resulted in growth of many ornamental and exotic species. The Forest Department has also build proper fences to safeguard animals and birds especially peacocks also providing them with appropriate water supply. This has affected in some or other way on the natural vegetation of the hill. A new road connecting Balbharati and Paud Phata is proposed so as to decrease traffic pressure in Nal Stop Chowk. The road will cut across a nearly two kilometre patch of forest on vetal hill, cutting close to ten thousand fully matured and grown trees. The proposed bypass will bring automobile pollution, noise and congestion into the heart of a green area at the foot and lower ridge of the Vetal hill. This is a catastrophic proposal and will destroy one of the last virgin green areas left in Pune.

Several citizen groups and activists have opposed the proposal. Twelve NGOs recently wrote a letter to the PMC opposing the road. A blog and an online petition was promoted to stop the construction of the road. Nagrik Chetana Manch has gone to the Mumbai high Court in a PIL and the HC has stayed the construction of the road. Due to increased urbanization and increased population the biotic pressure in the form of cutting of trees has increased on forest of Vetal Hill.
