= University of Virginia School of Data Science =

School of the University of Virginia, US

School of Data Science
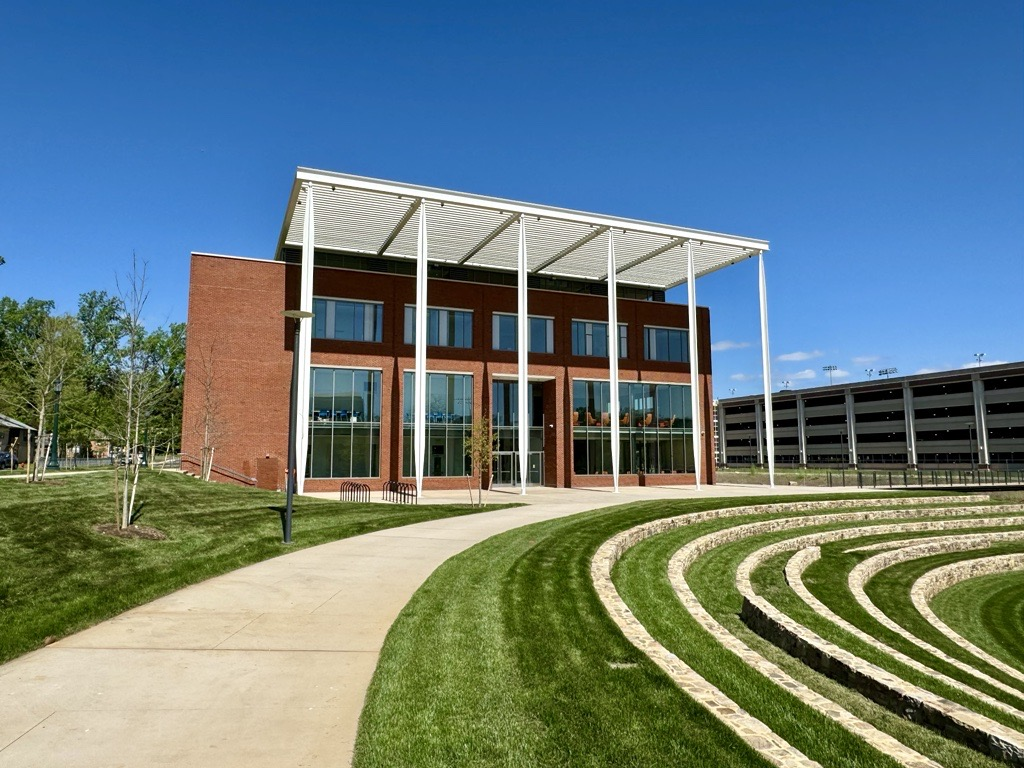
- Motto: A School without Walls
- Type: public school of data science
- Established: September 19, 2019
- Affiliations: University of Virginia
- Dean: Jeffrey Blume
- Location: Charlottesville, Virginia, United States
- Campus: Suburban
- Website: datascience.virginia.edu

The University of Virginia School of Data Science is the school for data science at the University of Virginia. It offers bachelors, masters, and doctorate degrees. It was established in September 2019. The school's physical building opened in April 2024.

== History ==
Prior to the formation of the school, University of Virginia professor Don Brown established the Data Science Institute in 2013. Philip Bourne was leader from 2017 until his passing in 2026, at which time Jeffrey Blume became interim dean.

In early 2019, University of Virginia president Jim Ryan publicly discussed plans for establishing a school of data science. Later that year, the university's board of visitors approved those plans, followed by the State Council of Higher Education for Virginia approving the school.

The school offered data science master's degrees from 2014, doctorates from 2022 and bachelor degrees from 2024.

Governor of Virginia Glenn Youngkin officiated the opening ceremony of the School of Data Science building in April 2024.

Hopkins Architects is the design architect and VMDO is the architect of record. The building is 61,000 square feet and four stories. The architects collaborated with researchers in the school to create a building which emphasized the ethics of artificial intelligence, open science, diversity, equity, and inclusion, and translational research. The building conforms to the style of the university as a UNESCO World Heritage Site and is designed to match the university's existing Jeffersonian architecture and to evoke Jefferson's story of the university and The Lawn as an academical village. The building has earned LEED Gold certification through U.S. Green Building Council.

The data science building is the first construction in a development of Charlottesville's corridor at the intersection of Emmet Street and Ivy Road. Planned future interconnected construction includes a hotel and conference center, a performing arts center, and a space for the University's Karsh Institute of Democracy.

== Funding ==
Donors to the School of Data Science include the Quantitative Foundation with a gift of $120 million in January 2019, Capital One which gave $2 million in April 2021, and university alumnus Oscar Woods who gave $100,000 in October 2023.
