= AISSMS College of Pharmacy =

Pharmacy college in Pune, India

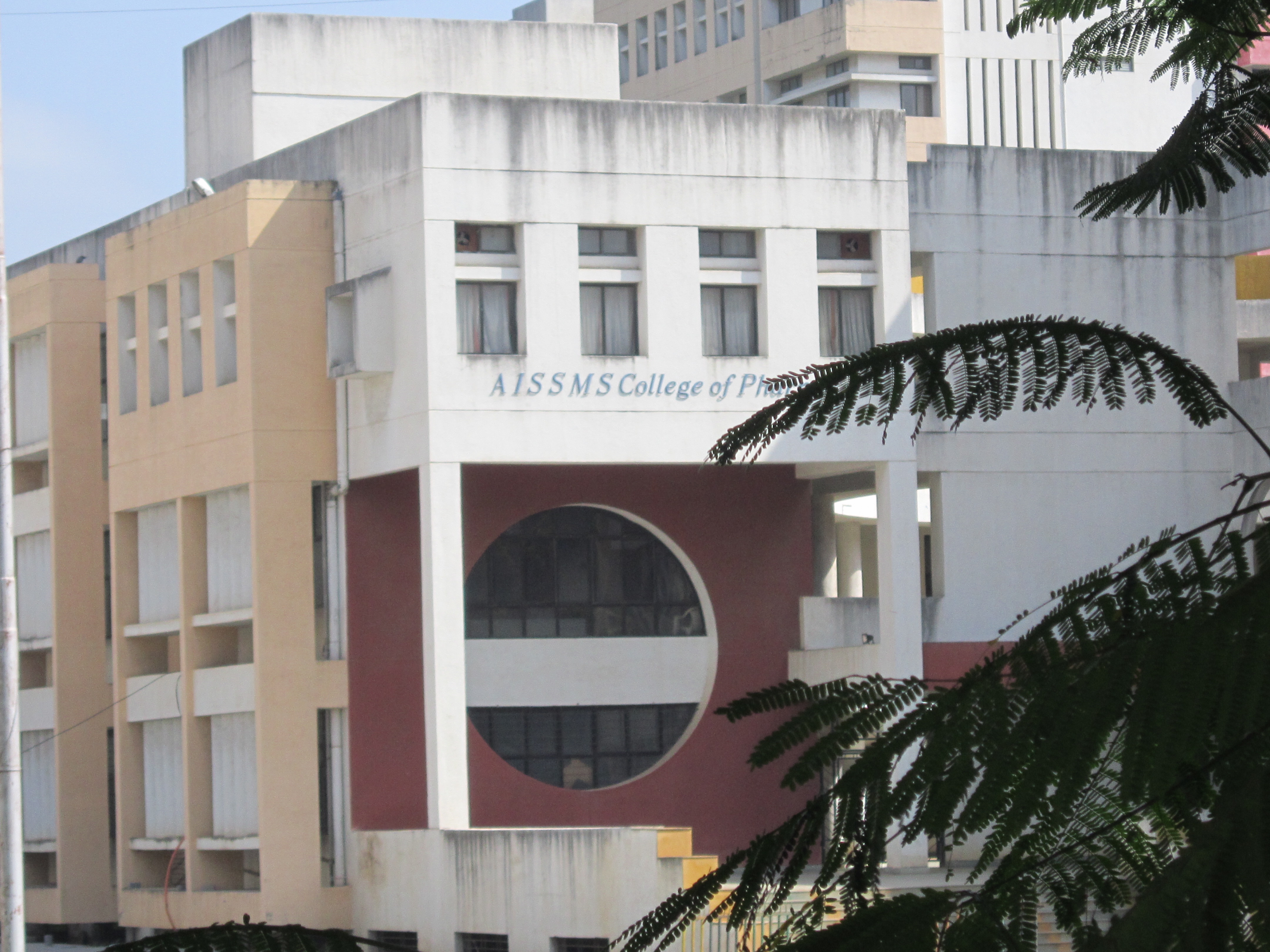
- Established: 1996
- Key people: Ashwini R. Madgulkar
- Formerly called: Shree Shivaji Preparatory Military School (SSPMS)
- Location: Pune, Pune, Maharashtra, India
- Coordinates: 18.530864°N 73.866658°E
- Interactive map of AISSMS College of Pharmacy
- Website: https://aissmscop.com/

AISSMS College of Pharmacy, Pune is a Pharmacy college affiliated to the AICTE, PCI, New Delhi and University of Pune, India. It was established in 1996.

== History ==
The AISSMS College of Pharmacy was established in the year 1996 with the approval of AICTE, PCI, and Govt. of Maharashtra and affiliated to Pune University. College offers the following courses.

== Location ==
The college is situated near RTO Office, Shivajinagar.

== Academics ==
=== Courses offered ===
-Bachelor of Pharmacy (B.Pharm)- 100 Seats
-Masters in Pharmacy (M.Pharm) – 48 Seats

AISSMS College of Pharmacy has been recognized as Research Center for PhD Degree.

== Research ==
AISSMS College of Pharmacy is doing research on AIDS virus.

== Co-curricular Activities ==
The college conducts many activities, including the sports week which is held every year generally during the month of December; as well as the college gathering, an event that is held once every two years. While the sports week includes outdoor and indoor games such as cricket, football, basketball, volleyball, chess, carrom, table tennis, badminton etc., the college gathering includes various events such as drama, dance, singing, scientific model making, personality contest and orchestra. Also, the college holds an alumni meet every year to create a platform for interaction between the students and the alumni.

== Rankings ==
The college was ranked 99th in India by the NIRF in the pharmacy ranking in 2024.

University rankings

Pharmacy – India
- NIRF (2024): 99
