= Tathavade =

Neighbourhood in Pimpri-Chinchwad, India

Tathawade
- Neighbourhood
- Location in Maharashtra, India
- Coordinates: 18.6289°N 73.7481°E
- Country: India
- State: Maharashtra
- District: Pune

Population (2001)
  - Total: 7,975

Languages
  - Official: Marathi
- Time zone: UTC+5:30 (IST)

Tathawade is a neighbourhood in Pimpri-Chinchwad in the Indian state of Maharashtra. It is an emerging suburb of Pune. Many educational institutes like JSPM Institutes, Indira College, Balaji Institutes, Orchids International School, Blossom Public School are located here. Being at a close proximity to Hinjawadi IT Park & Expressway, the real estate has flourished here. Notable business coming up here are: Panchshil Business Park World Trade Center Decathlon Dmart near Indira College

== Demographics ==
As of 2001 India census, Tathawade had a population of 7975. Males constitute 54% of the population and females 46%. Tathavade has an average literacy rate of 54%, lower than the national average of 59.5%: male literacy is 63%, and female literacy is 44%. In Tathawade, 17% of the population is under 6 years of age.
