= Gahunje =

Village in Maharashtra

- Village
- Location in Maharashtra, India Gahunje (India)
- Coordinates: 18.6681709°N 73.6851847°E
- Country: India
- State: Maharashtra
- District: Pune
- Taluka: Mawal

Government
  - Type: Panchayati Raj
  - Body: Gram panchayat
  - Sarpanch: Kuldeep Bodke

Area
  - Total: 505.32 ha (1,248.7 acres)

Population (2011)
  - Total: 4,046
  - Density: 800.7/km^{2} (2,074/sq mi)
- Sex ratio 2461/1585 ♂/♀

Languages
  - Official: Marathi
  - Other spoken: Hindi
- Time zone: UTC+5:30 (IST)
- Pin code: 410405
- Telephone code: 02114
- ISO 3166 code: IN-MH
- Vehicle registration: MH-14
- Website: pune.nic.in

Gahunje is a village and gram panchayat in Pune district of Maharashtra, India. It is situated in Mawal taluka of Pune district in the state of Maharashtra. It encompasses an area of 505.26 ha (1,249 acres).

It lies on the northwestern border of Pimpri-Chinchwad, midway between Pune and Lonavala.

Maharashtra Cricket Association Stadium is situated in this village. This village is known for this Test cricket venue.

== Geography ==
Gahunje is located near Mumbai- Pune Express highway. This village's grampanchayat is have ISO certified. This village's 352.37 hector land is under cultivation. Milk dairy and agriculture are the primary occupations of this village's peoples. Rice, Wheat and Sugarcane are the primary crops in this village. It have facilities such as solar lights on small settlements, roads, drainage system and Grampanchayat's water service.

== Education facilities ==
Gahunje have 2 primary school of Jilha parishad.

== Administration ==
The village is administrated by a sarpanch, an elected representative who leads a gram panchayat. At the time of the 2011 Census of India, the village was a self-contained gram panchayat, meaning that there were no other constituent villages governed by the body.

== Demographics ==
At the 2011 census, the village comprised 863 households. The population of 4,046 was split between 2,461 males and 1,585 females.

== Air travel connectivity ==
The closest airport to the village is Pune Airport.

== Recognition ==
Gahunje village has achieved the awards of Tanta mukta scheme and Nirmal gram scheme (Clean village scheme).

== See also ==
- List of villages in Mawal taluka
