= Pimpri-Chinchwad =

City in Maharashtra, India

Pimpri Chinchwad PCMC
- Satellite city
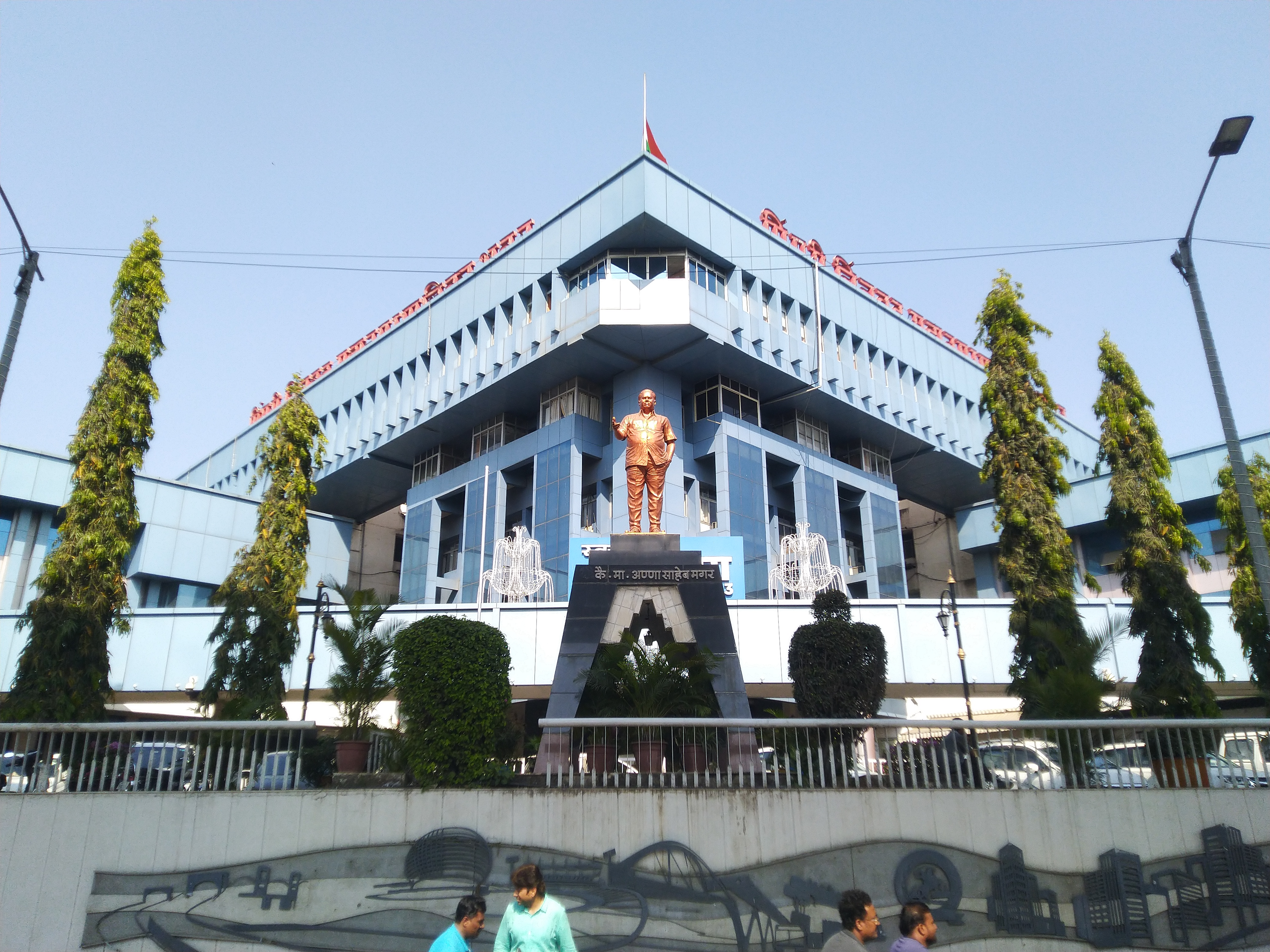
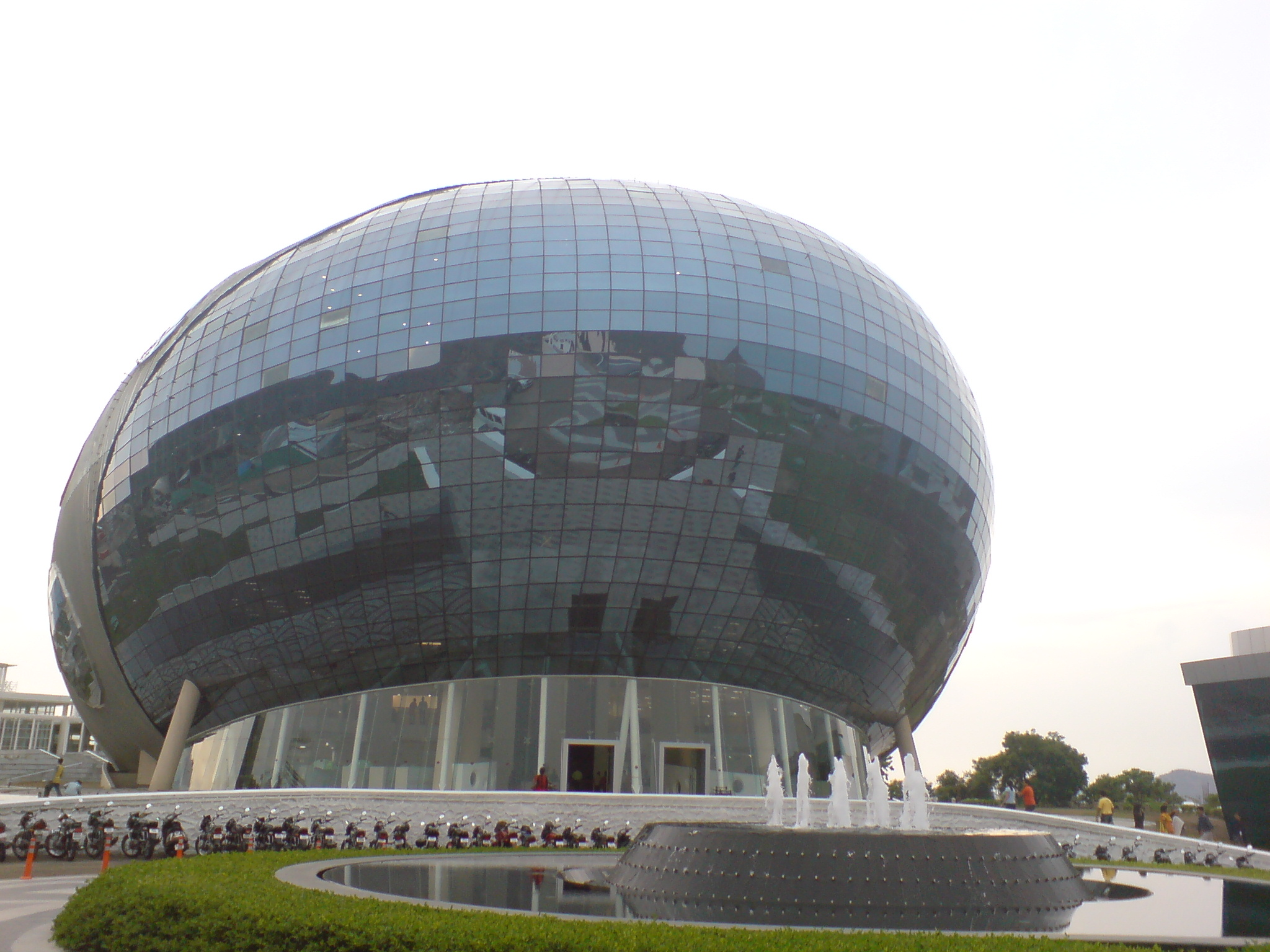
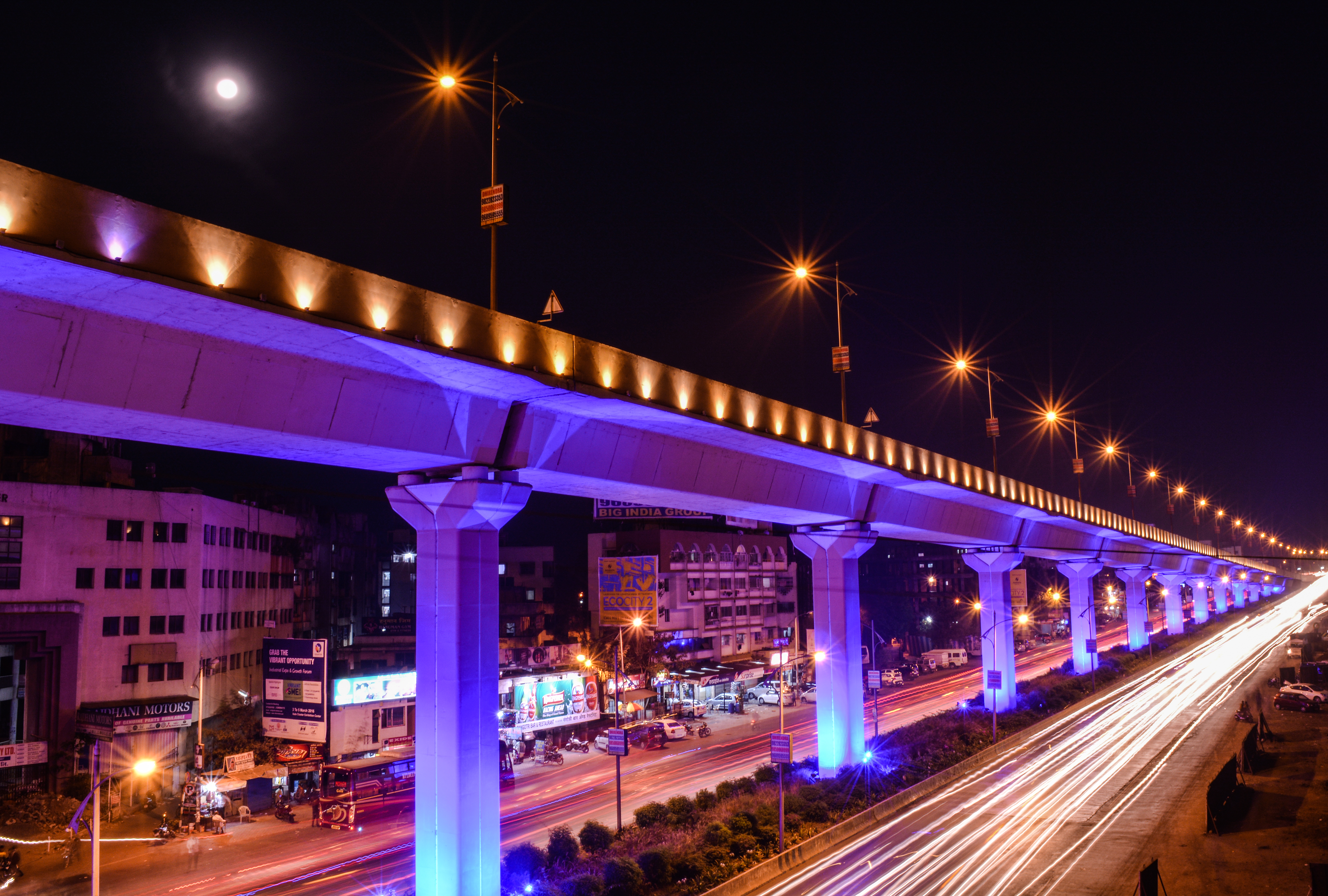
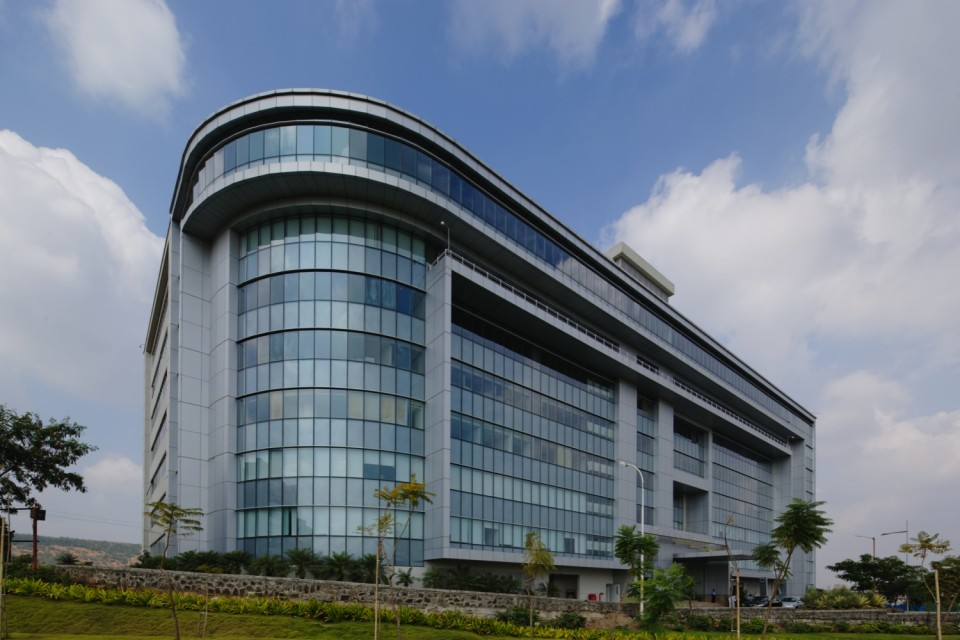
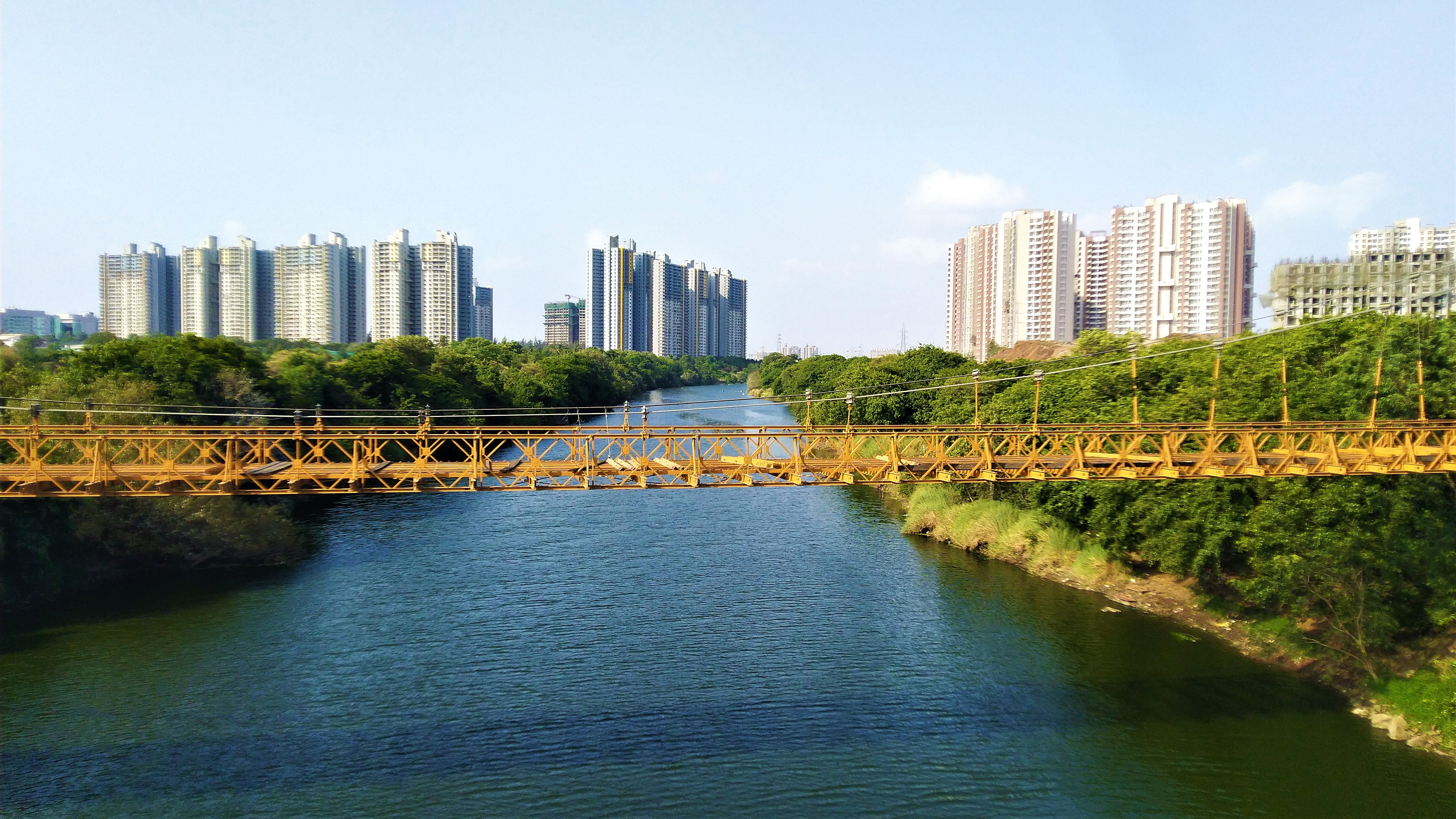
- Clockwise from top: PCMC Building, Infosys, Embassy Tech Zone, Mula River in Hinjewadi, JRD TATA Bridge, Old Pune–Mumbai Highway

- Location within Maharashtra Location within India Location within Asia
- Coordinates: 18°37′05″N 73°48′04″E
- Country: India
- State: Maharashtra
- District: Pune district
- Division: Pune division
- Established: 11 October 1982

Government
  - Type: Municipal Corporation
  - Body: PCMC
  - District Collector: Rajesh Deshmukh
  - Municipal Commissioner & Administrator: Dr. Vijay Suryawanshi, IAS
  - Mayor: Ravi Landge (BJP)

Area
  - Total: 181 km^{2} (70 sq mi)
- Elevation: 530 m (1,740 ft)

Population (2011)
  - Total: 1,727,692
  - Rank: 18th
  - Density: 9,550/km^{2} (24,700/sq mi)

Languages
  - Official: Marathi
- Time zone: UTC+5:30 (IST)
- PIN: 411017
- Area code: +91-20
- Vehicle registration: MH14, MH12
- Lok Sabha constituency: Maval, Shirur
- Vidhan Sabha constituency: Chinchwad, Pimpri, Bhosari
- Urban Planning Authority: Pune Metropolitan Region Development Authority
- Website: http://www.pcmcindia.gov.in

Pimpri-Chinchwad, also known as PCMC, is a city in the Indian state of Maharashtra. The city is about 15 km (9.3 mi) northwest of the historic city of Pune, at an altitude of 590 m (1,940 ft) above sea level. It is the fifth largest city in Maharashtra and the eighteenth largest city in India and the sixteenth largest satellite city in the world by population. The city is located 135 km (84 mi) southeast from the state's capital Mumbai. It is one of the most rapidly developing suburban areas in India and has emerged as the third fastest growing city in the country. It is well known for its automotive, IT and manufacturing industry.

== History ==
The first reference to Pune region is found in two copper plates dated to 758 and 768 AD, issued by Rashtrakuta ruler Krishna I. The plates are called "Puny Vishaya" and "Punaka Vishaya" respectively. The plates mention areas around Pune such as Theur, Uruli, Khed, Dapodi, and also Bhosari, now part of the city.

Chinchwad is noted for the shrine of Morya Gosavi, a prominent saint of the Ganapatya denomination of Hinduism that worships Lord Ganesha as the Supreme Being or its metaphysical concept of Brahman. Various sources place Moraya Gosavi between the 13th and 17th centuries CE. The inscription on the temple records that its construction began in 1658 CE.

=== British Raj and partition of India ===
Before the independence of India, Pimpri and Chinchwad were small independent rural settlements on the outskirts of Pune along the Pavana River.

==== Chapekar brothers ====
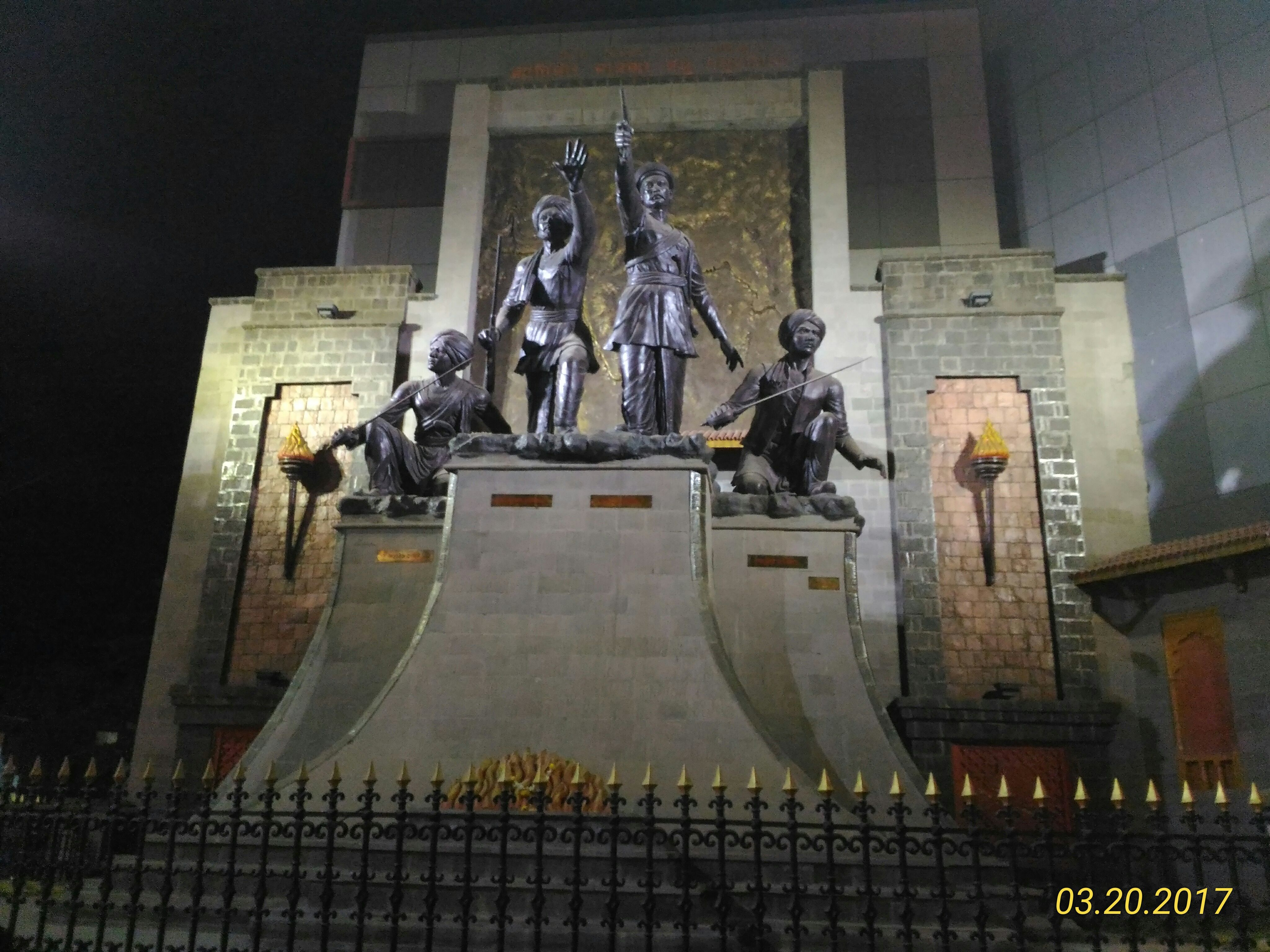
Monument depicting Chapekar Brothers, Chinchwad

Chinchwad is the birthplace of the Chapekar brothers: Damodar Hari (1870–1898), Balkrishna Hari (1873–1899) and Vasudeo Hari, who assassinated W. C. Rand, a British civil service officer and the chairman of the Special Plague Committee of Poona (Pune), on 22 June 1897.

==== Pimpri Camp ====
Following the partition of India, the Government of India constructed 1,609 residences and laid out around 300 plots on 203 acres of land in the Pimpri area. This area came to be known as Pimpri Camp is one of the 31 refugee camps in Bombay State (present day Maharashtra) set up during the period.

=== Pimpri-Chinchwad after independence ===
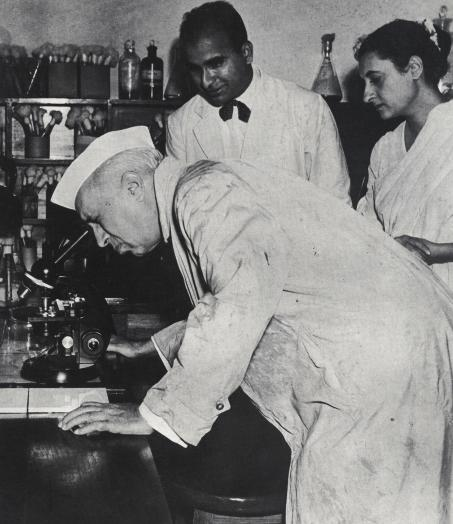
India's first PM Jawaharlal Nehru along with Indira Gandhi at the Penicillin Factory, Pimpri in 1956

After Indian independence from the British in 1947. In 1955, Hindustan Antibiotics was set up in Pimpri with the cooperation of WHO and UNICEF with the social objective of providing affordable drugs throughout India. It was inaugurated by India's first Prime Minister Jawaharlal Nehru on 10 March 1954. Production began in 1955. The establishment of Hindustan Antibiotics in 1954 marked the beginning of industrial development in the Chinchwad, Bhosari, and Pimpri areas. Following which in 1962 MIDC acquired large chunks of land in and around Pimpri-Chinchwad area and provided the necessary infrastructure for new businesses to set up operations. This facilitated the industrial growth of the present day Pimpri Chinchwad city as the industrial town with presence of many national and international automobile industries. The presence of industries provided job opportunities which attracted a large workforce from Maharashtra as well as other states of the country. The in-migration along with the natural growth of population has led to the rapid growth of the city in the last four decades.

== Geography ==
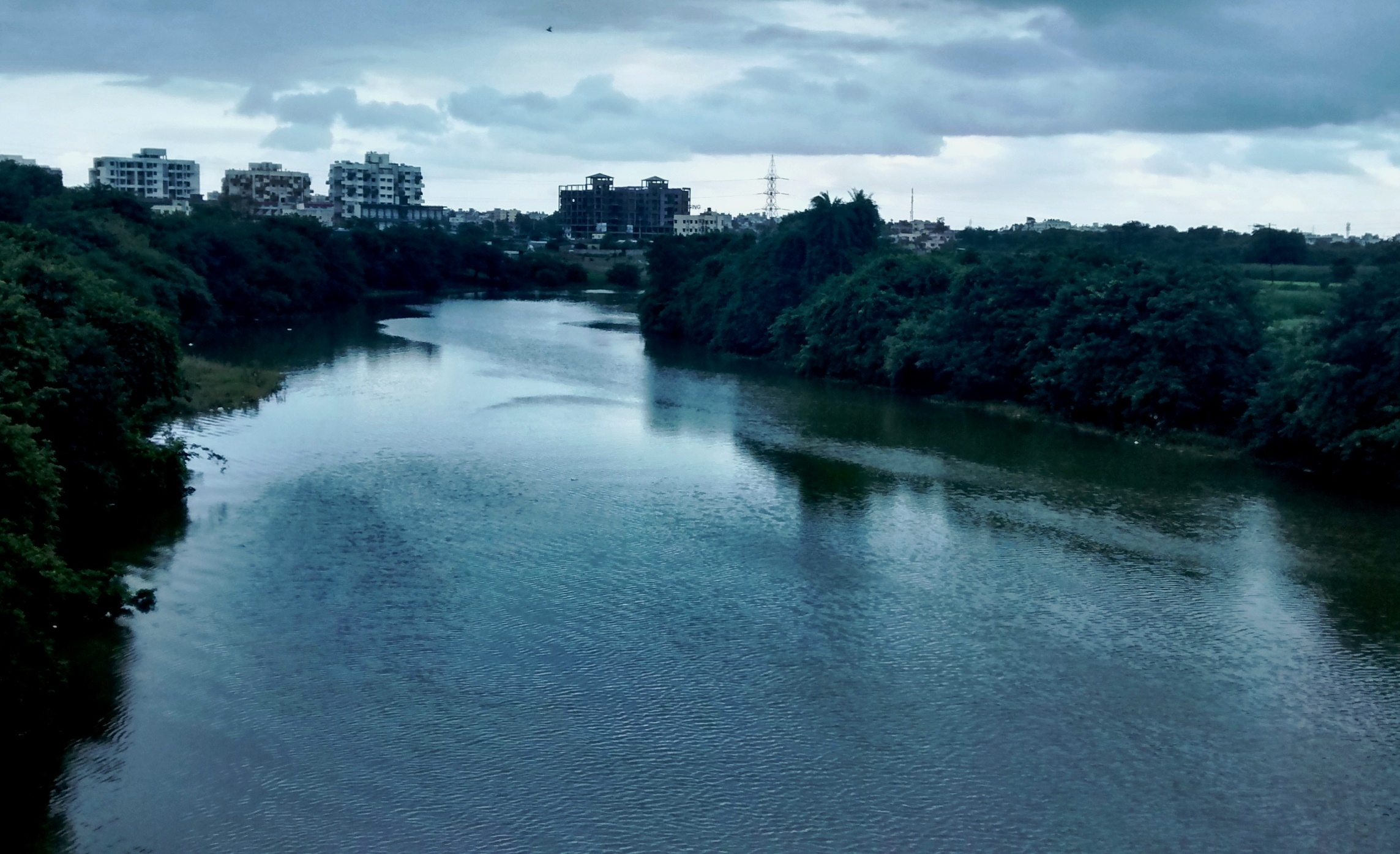
Pavana River at Ravet.

The area within the city limits is widely considered as 'flat' given the altitude varying between 530 and 570 m above sea level. The city is situated approximately at 18° 37' north latitude and 73° 48' east longitude bordering limits of Pune Municipal Corporation on the north and northwest. The historic centre is 15 km from each end. Three rivers Pavana, Mula and Indrayani flow through this area. The rivers originates from the Western Ghats. The base rock found throughout the city is Deccan trap basalt. Building stone is the only commercially important mineral found in the area. In 1970s, due to increased industrialisation on Mumbai–Pune Highway, many villages around the highway were merged to form Pimpri-Chinchwad Municipal Corporation. The earliest villages which were absorbed were Pimpri, Chinchwad, Dapodi, Bhosari etc.

=== Climate ===
The city experiences three seasons: summer, monsoon and winter. Typical summer months are February to May with maximum temperatures above 35 °C and reaching up to 42 °C on hotter days. The city receives most of its 722 mm of rainfall in the monsoon months of June to September. The temperature in the winter months of October to January ranges from 12 °C (min) to 30 °C (max), with night temperatures often falling below 10 °C.

Pimpri-Chinchwad has a tropical wet and dry (type Aw) climate, with the characteristics of a hot semi-arid climate (type BSh) climate with average temperatures ranging between 20 and 28 °C (68 and 82 °F). Typical summer months are from mid-March to mid-June, with maximum temperatures sometimes reaching 42 °C (108 °F). The warmest month in Pimpri-Chinchwad is May. The city often has heavy dusty winds in May, with humidity remaining high. Even during the hottest months, the nights are usually cool due to Pune's high altitude. The highest temperature recorded was 43.3 °C (109.9 °F) on 30 April 1897.

The monsoon lasts from June to October, with moderate rainfall and temperatures ranging from 22 to 28 °C (72 to 82 °F). Most of the 722 mm (28.43 in) of annual rainfall in the city falls between June and September, and July is the wettest month of the year. Hailstorms are not unheard of.

For most of December and January the daytime temperature hovers around 26 °C (79 °F) while night temperatures are below 9 °C (48 °F), often dropping to 5 to 6 °C (41 to 43 °F). The lowest temperature recorded was 1.7 °C (35 °F) on 17 January 1935.

Climate data for Pimpri-Chinchwad (1981–2010, extremes 1901–2012)
Month	Jan	Feb	Mar	Apr	May	Jun	Jul	Aug	Sep	Oct	Nov	Dec	Year
Record high °C (°F)	35.3 (95.5)	38.9 (102.0)	42.8 (109.0)	43.3 (109.9)	43.3 (109.9)	41.7 (107.1)	36.0 (96.8)	35.0 (95.0)	36.1 (97.0)	37.8 (100.0)	36.1 (97.0)	35.0 (95.0)	43.3 (109.9)
Mean daily maximum °C (°F)	29.8 (85.6)	32.1 (89.8)	35.6 (96.1)	37.6 (99.7)	36.9 (98.4)	31.9 (89.4)	28.3 (82.9)	27.6 (81.7)	29.4 (84.9)	31.5 (88.7)	30.4 (86.7)	29.2 (84.6)	31.7 (89.1)
Mean daily minimum °C (°F)	11.2 (52.2)	12.2 (54.0)	15.7 (60.3)	19.6 (67.3)	22.6 (72.7)	23.1 (73.6)	22.4 (72.3)	21.7 (71.1)	20.9 (69.6)	18.4 (65.1)	14.5 (58.1)	11.5 (52.7)	17.8 (64.0)
Record low °C (°F)	1.7 (35.1)	3.9 (39.0)	7.2 (45.0)	10.6 (51.1)	13.8 (56.8)	17.0 (62.6)	18.9 (66.0)	17.2 (63.0)	13.2 (55.8)	9.4 (48.9)	4.6 (40.3)	3.3 (37.9)	1.7 (35.1)
Average rainfall mm (inches)	1.1 (0.04)	0.3 (0.01)	2.2 (0.09)	8.5 (0.33)	26.8 (1.06)	173.4 (6.83)	181.4 (7.14)	145.2 (5.72)	146.1 (5.75)	86.3 (3.40)	25.0 (0.98)	7.0 (0.28)	803.0 (31.61)
Average rainy days	0.2	0.1	0.2	0.8	1.9	9.5	12.4	9.8	8.0	4.4	1.2	0.3	48.7
Average relative humidity (%) (at 17:30 IST)	34	26	21	24	37	66	76	79	73	53	43	39	47
Mean monthly sunshine hours	294.5	282.5	300.7	303.0	313.1	183.0	114.7	111.6	177.0	244.9	264.0	279.0	2,868
Mean daily sunshine hours	9.5	10.0	9.7	10.1	10.1	6.1	3.7	3.6	5.9	7.9	8.8	9.0	7.9
Source: India Meteorological Department

=== Cityscape ===
Selection of neighborhoods in Pimpri-Chinchwad

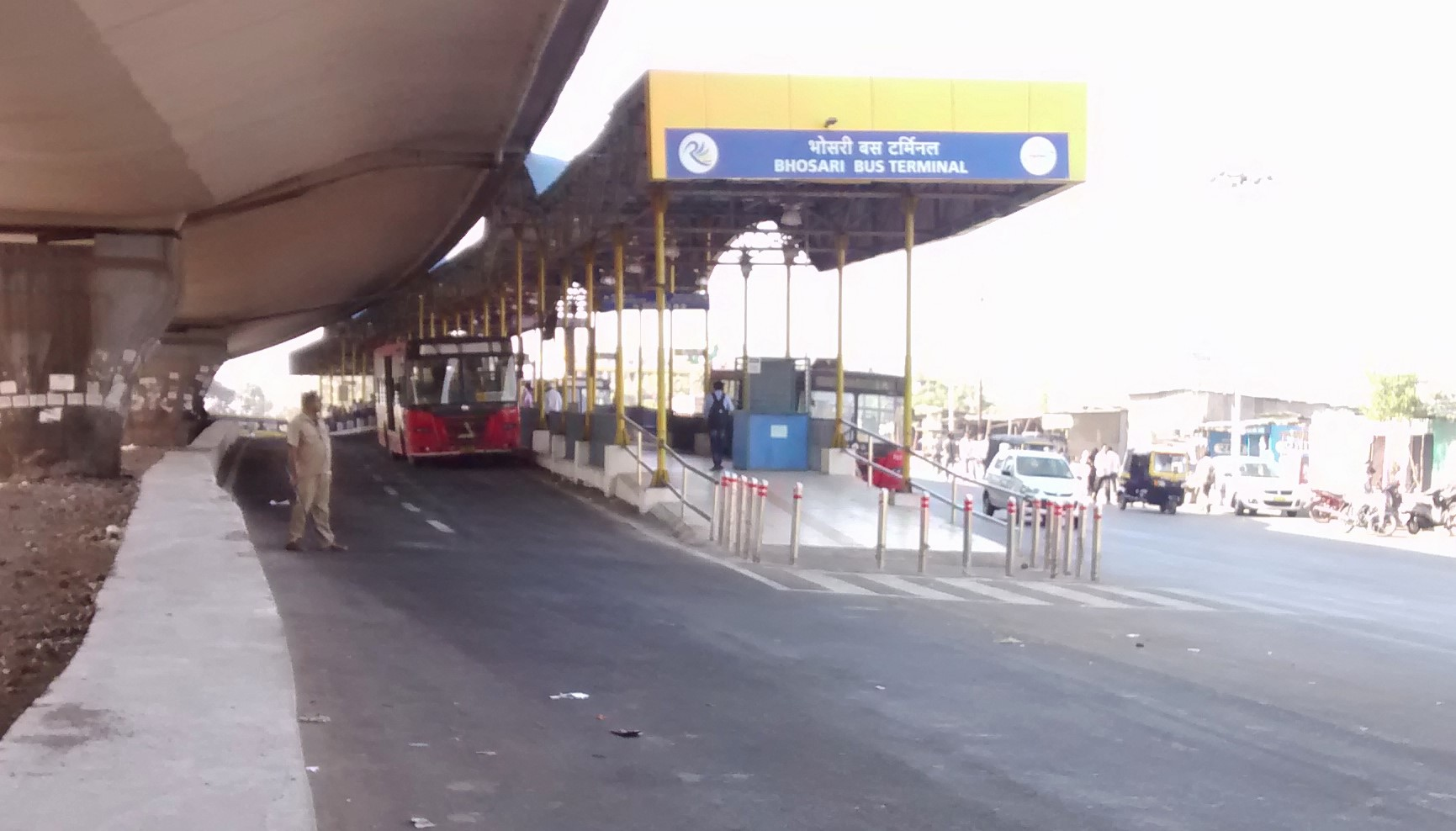
Bhosari

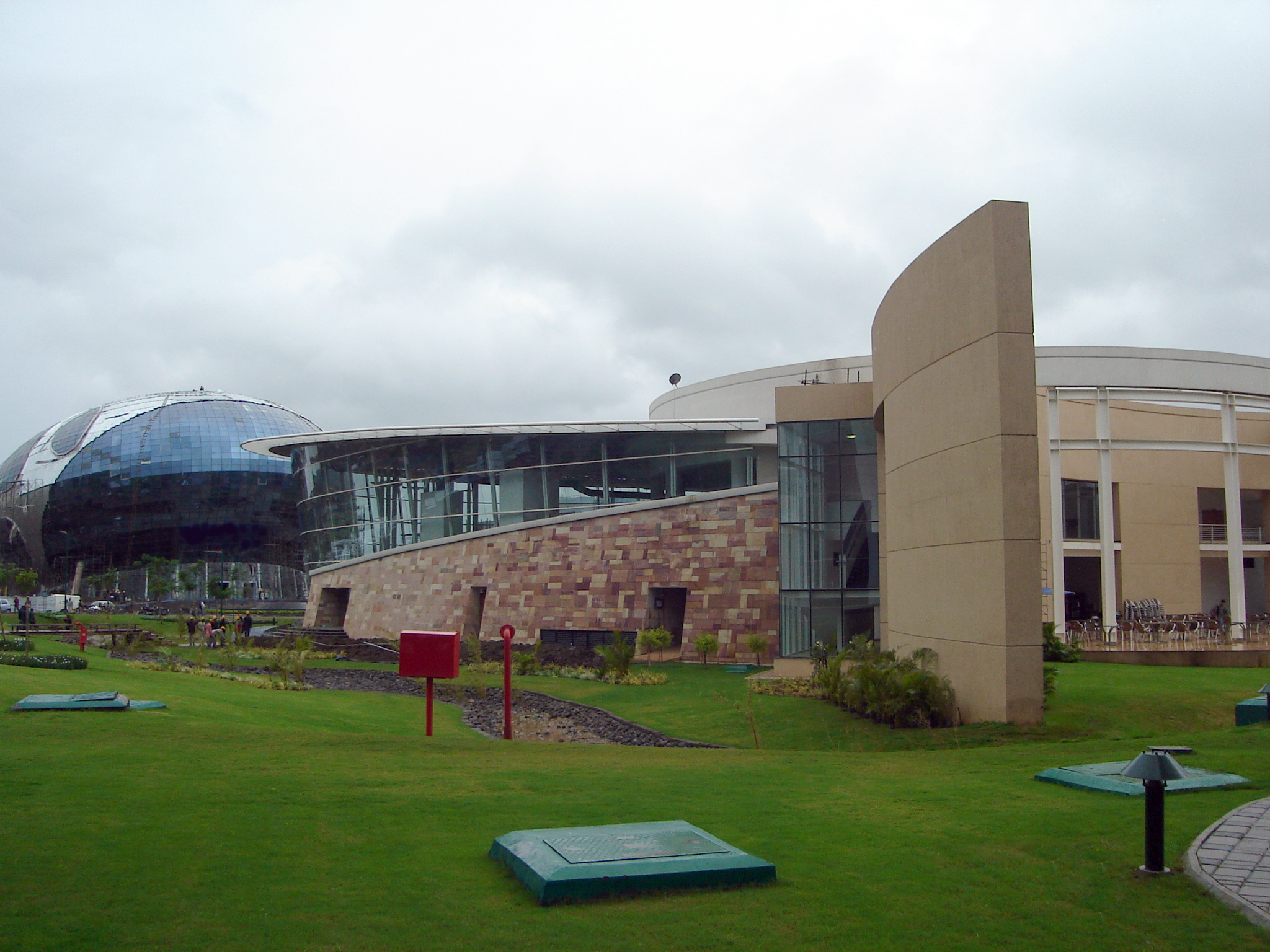
Hinjawadi

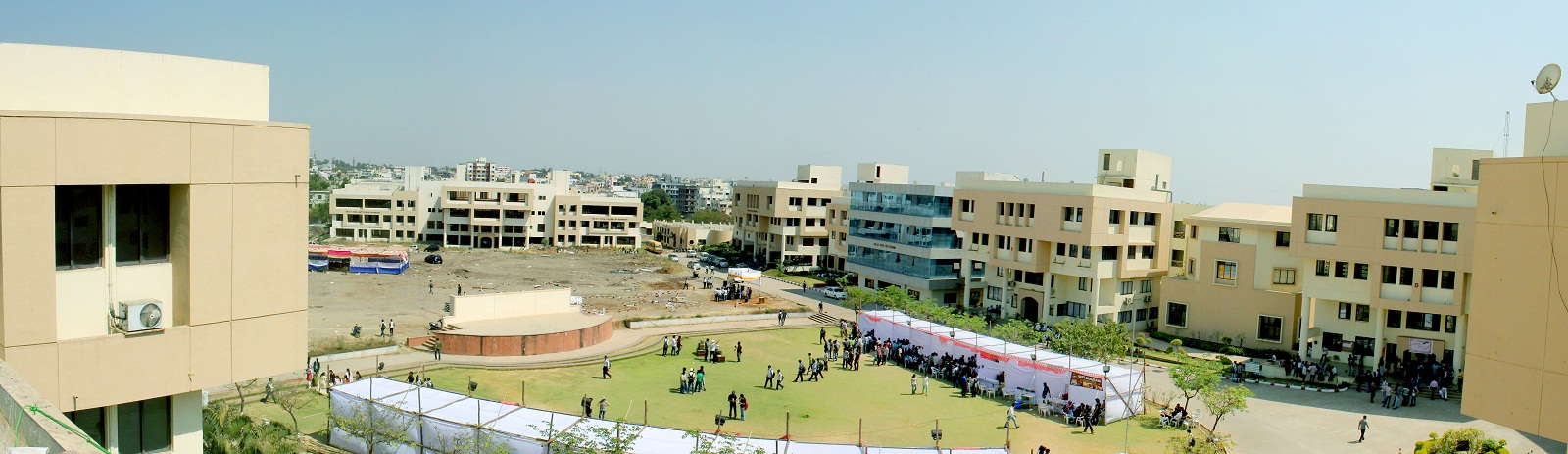
Nigdi

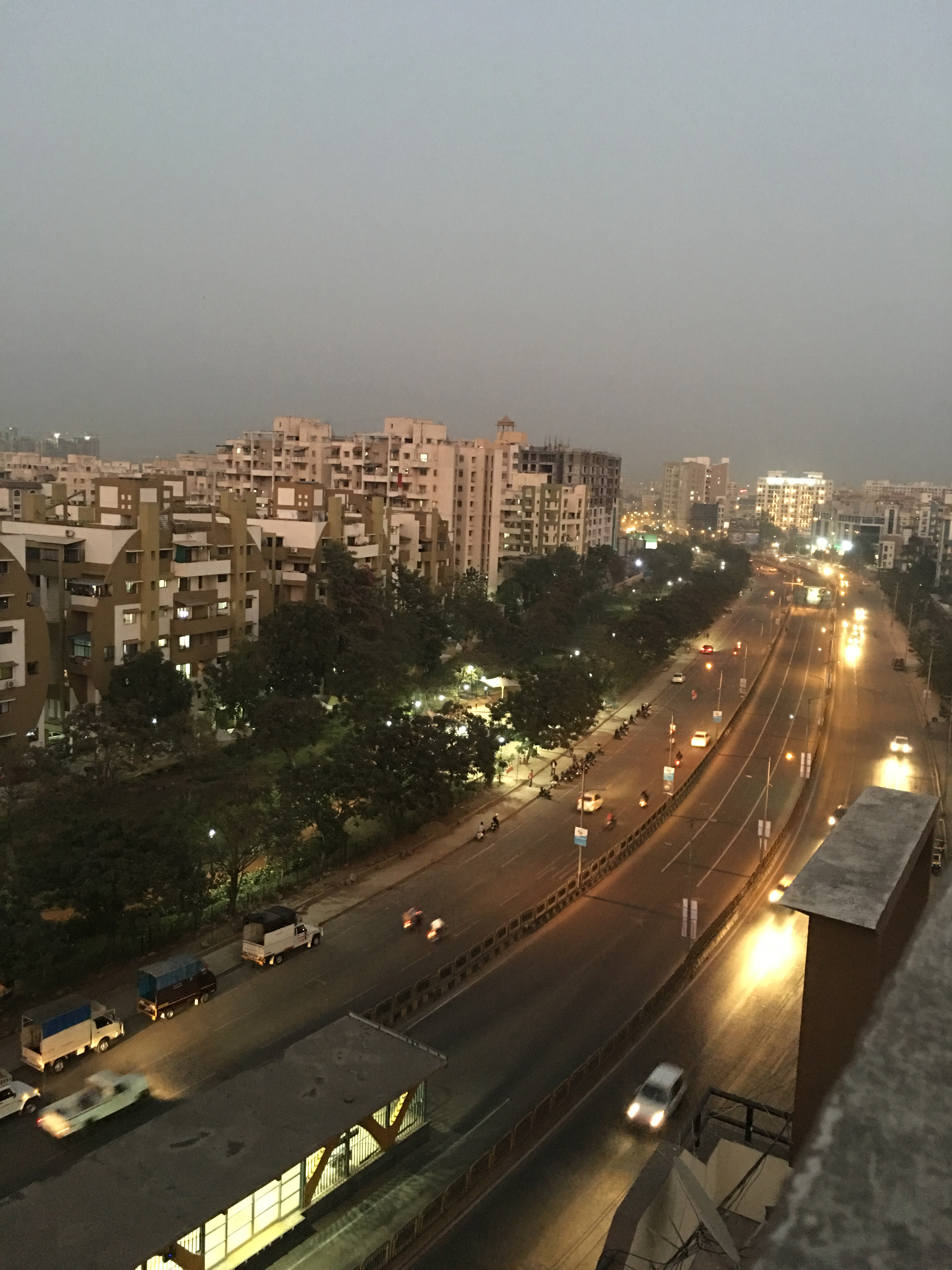
Pimple Saudagar

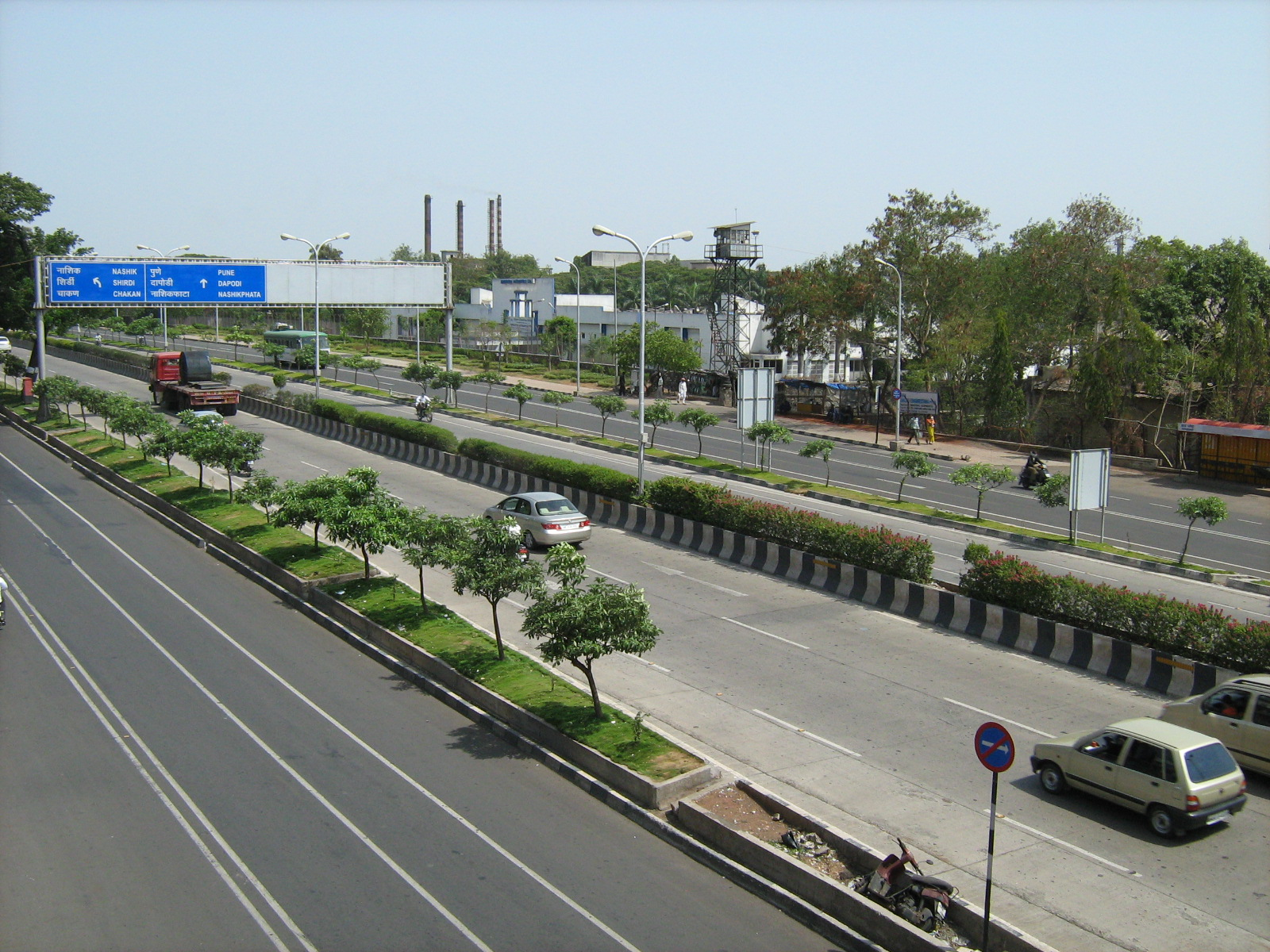
Pimpri

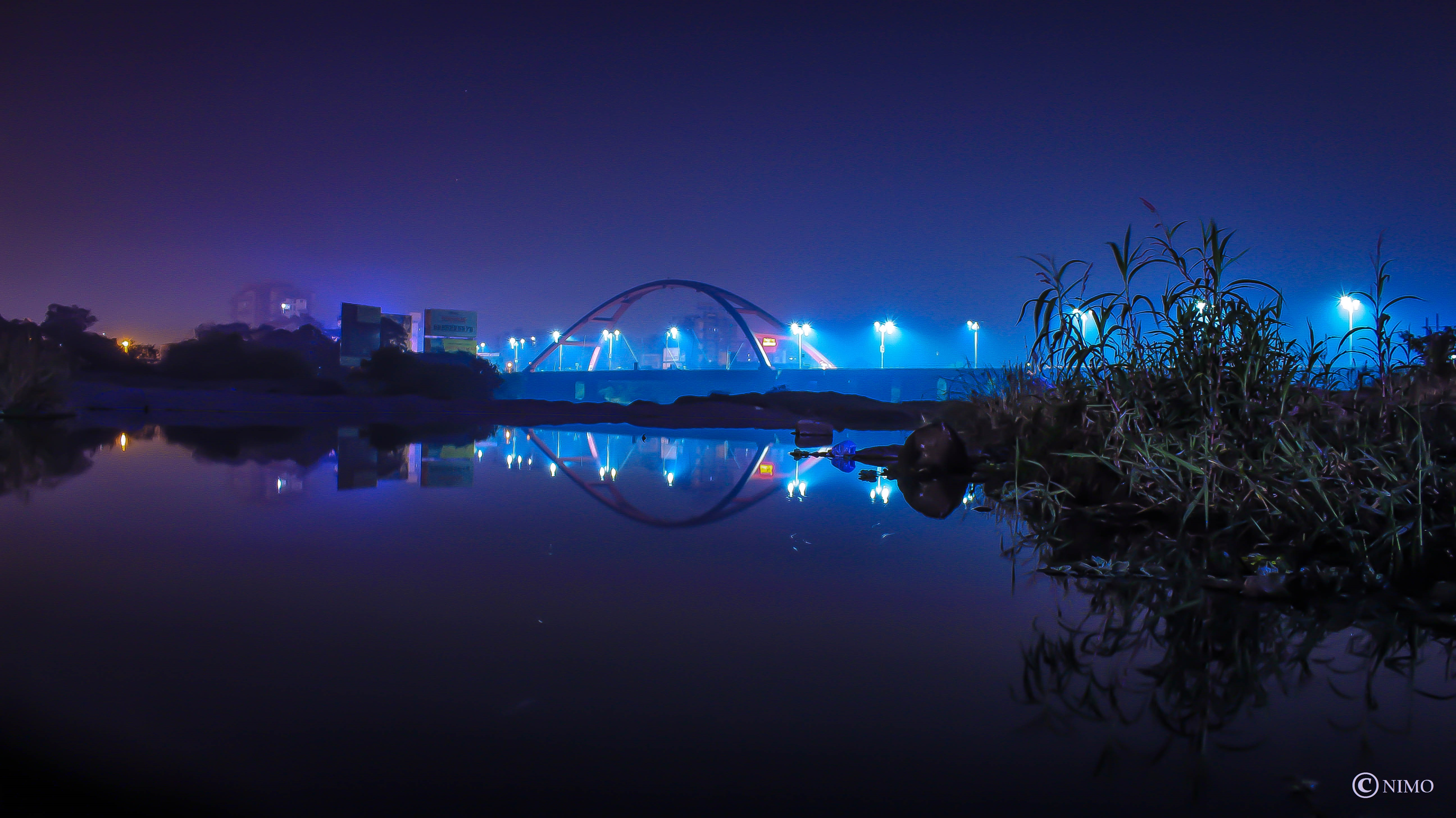
Ravet

== Demographics ==
Historical population
Year	Pop.	±%
1951	9,522	—
1961	27,975	+193.8%
1971	83,542	+198.6%
1981	232,935	+178.8%
1991	534,536	+129.5%
2001	1,020,448	+90.9%
2011	1,727,692	+69.3%
2021 (est)	2,700,000	+56.3%
Population figures for Pimpri-Chinchwad Municipal Corporation area Source: 1951-2011, 2021 (est).

As of the 2011 Census of India, the Pimpri Chinchwad Municipal Corporation area had a population of 1,729,692. The sex ratio was 833 females per 1000 males. About 13% of the population was under seven years of age with a sex ratio of 875 females per 1000 males. Around 8% of the city's population lives in slums. Pimpri-Chinchwad has an average literacy rate of 89.22% (92.41% males; 85.37% females), higher than the national average of 74.04%. The main language spoken in the city is Marathi. There is a significant Sindhi population in Pimpri, which dates to the partition of India in 1947. The neighbourhood has considerable Hindi, Malayalam, Punjabi, Gujarati, Tamil, Kannada, Telugu speaking population.

Language in Pimpri-Chinchwad M. Corp (2011)
1. Marathi (70.3%)
2. Hindi (14.2%)
3. Kannada (2.61%)
4. Telugu (1.36%)
5. Marwari (1.27%)
6. Urdu (1.23%)
7. Sindhi (1.23%)
8. Malayalam (1.19%)
9. Gujarati (0.94%)
10. Others (5.71%)

Map of Pimpri-Chinchwad
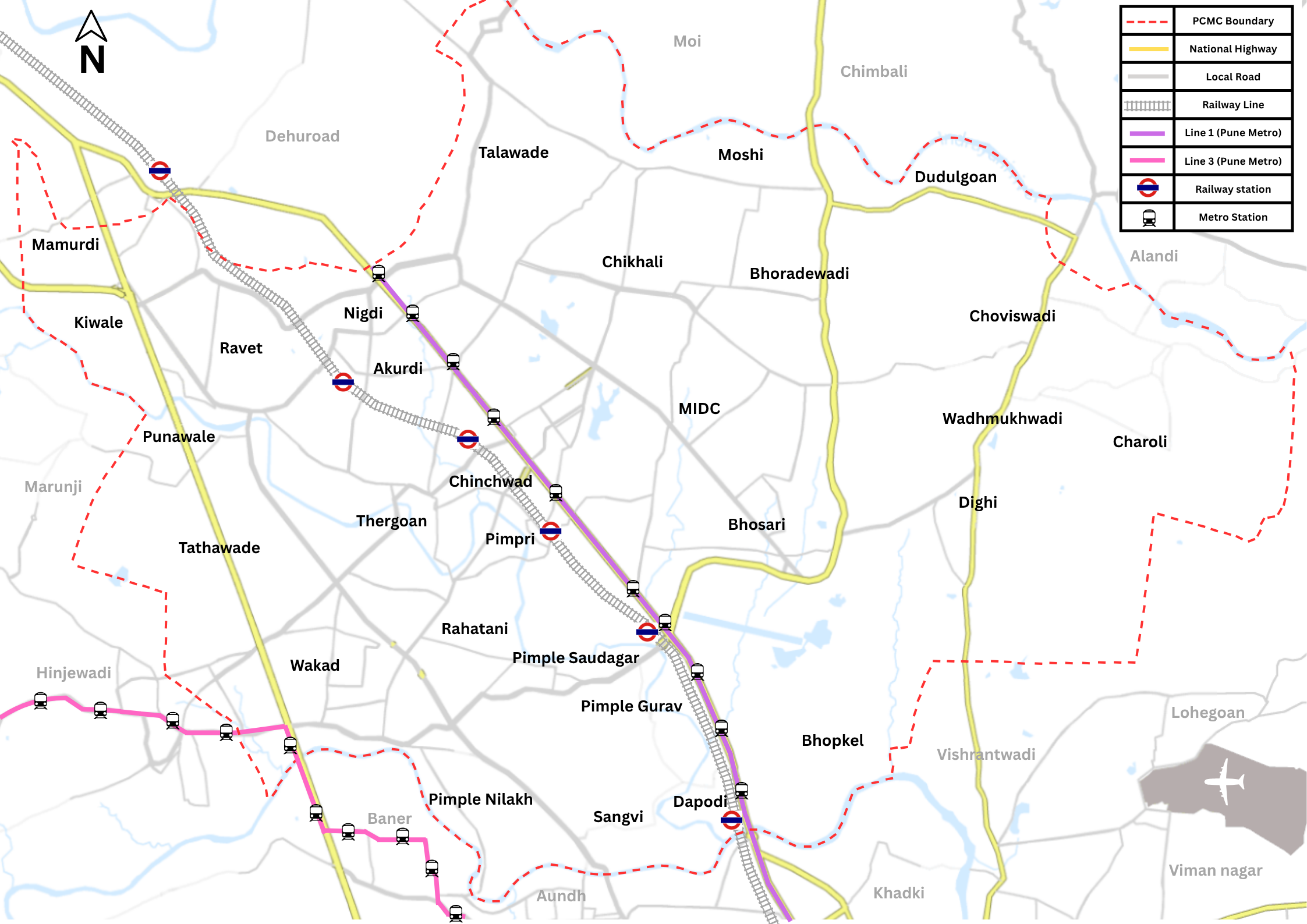

Population by areas in Pimpri-Chinchwad
Area	2011	2001	Change
Bhosari	260,677	154,334	▲68.9%
Chinchwad	196,720	114,897	▲71.21%
Pimpri	170,814	148,508	▲15.02%
Chikhali	138,874	50,703	▲173.9%
Rahatani	134,806	57,308	▲135.23%
Akurdi	108,283	103,743	▲4.28%
Pimple Gurav	100,995	31,489	▲220.73%
Thergaon	100,091	50,734	▲97.29%
Talawade	57,313	26,110	▲119.51%
Nigdi	55,074	55,140	▼0.12%
Sangavi	54,614	47,635	▲14.65%
Wakad	39,913	25,320	▲57.63%
Ravet	29,665	14,647	▲102.53%
Borhadewadi	28,847	6,402	▲350.59%
Dapodi	28,502	24,146	▲18.04%
Dighi	27,770	15,148	▲83.32%
Bhopkel	27,770	14,055	▲97.58%
Pimple Saudagar	25,755	9,581	▲168.81%
Pimple Niklakh	24,924	8,278	▲201.09%
Kiwale	17,779	11,317	▲57.10%
Punawale	17,487	5,989	▲191.99%
Tathawade	17,487	8,984	▲94.65%
Moshi	12,907	6,402	▲101.61%
Mamurdi	11,866	6,426	▲84.66%
Choviswadi	10,326	2,820	▲266.17%
Wadmukhwadi	10,326	4,230	▲144.11%
Charoli	10,326	7,050	▲46.47%
Dudulgaon	7,774	3,201	▲142.86%

=== Religion ===
Religion in Pimpri-Chinchwad (2011)
Religion	Percent
Hinduism	84.21%
Islam	6.91%
Buddhism	5.03%
Christianity	2.09%
Jainism	1.12%
Other or not stated	0.64%

Hinduism is the dominant religion in the city. Other religions with a significant presence include Islam, Christianity, Sikhism, Buddhism and Jainism.

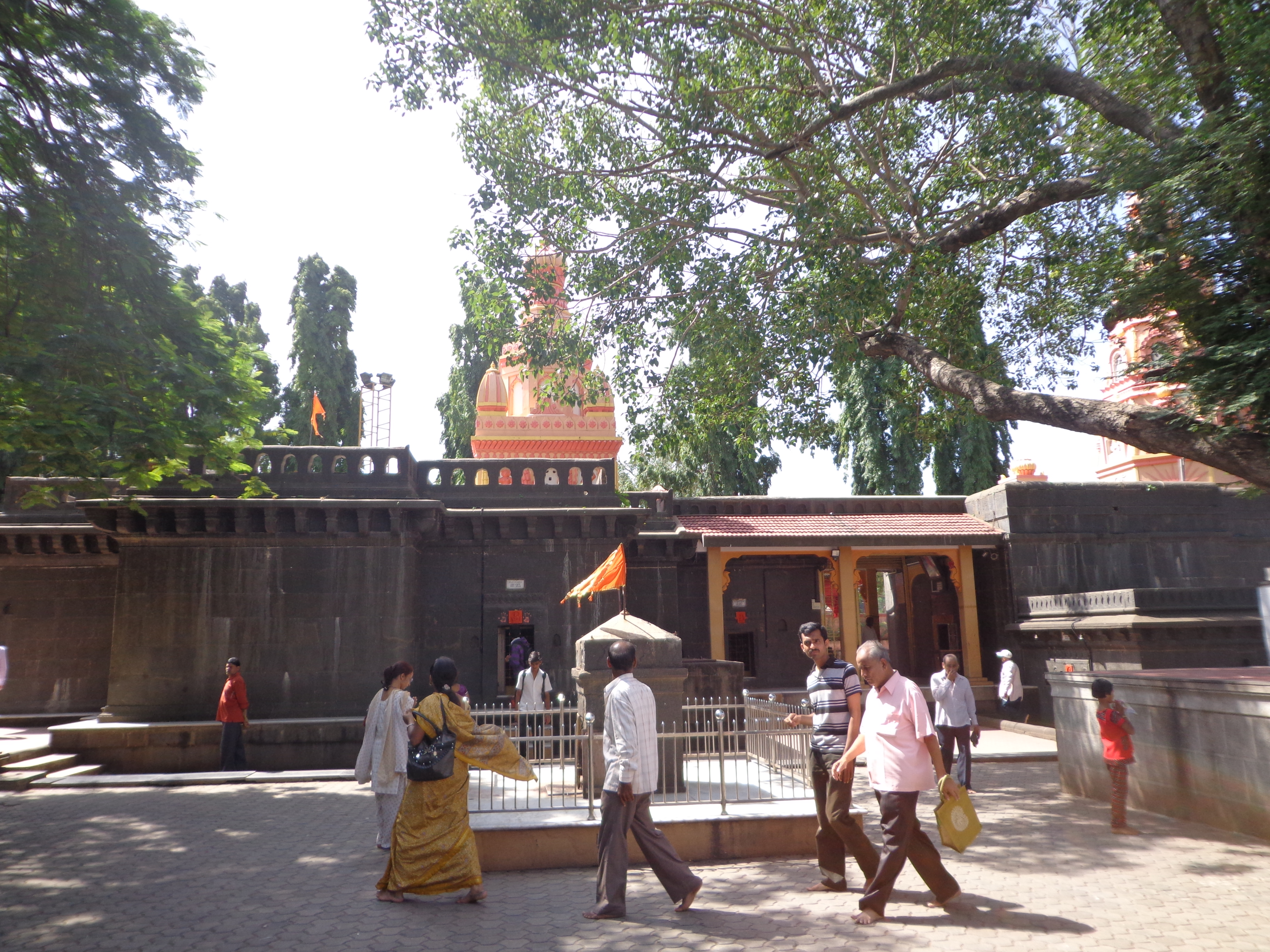
Morya Gosavi temple, Chinchwad

The samadhi (resting) places of the two most revered Marathi Bhakti saints, Dnyaneshwar and Tukaram, are at Alandi and Dehu respectively. The Khandoba Mandir in Akurdi is one the family deity for most Marathi Hindus. The Peshwa era rulers provided endowments to more Maruti temples than to temples of other deities such as Shiva, Ganesh or Vitthal. Even in the present time, there are more Maruti temples than those of other deities.

- Alandi - The town attracts millions of devotees annually to the resting place or (Samadhi) of the 13th century Marathi Bhakti saint, Sant Dnyaneshwar.
- Dehu - The town on the banks of the Indrayani River is associated with Sant Tukaram Maharaj, the 17th-century poet-saint of the Bhakti movement in Maharashtra. The town is visited by hundreds of thousands of people for the annual Pandharpur Wari when the paduka (symbolic sandals) of the saint are carried to Pandharpur in a palkhi.

== Economy ==
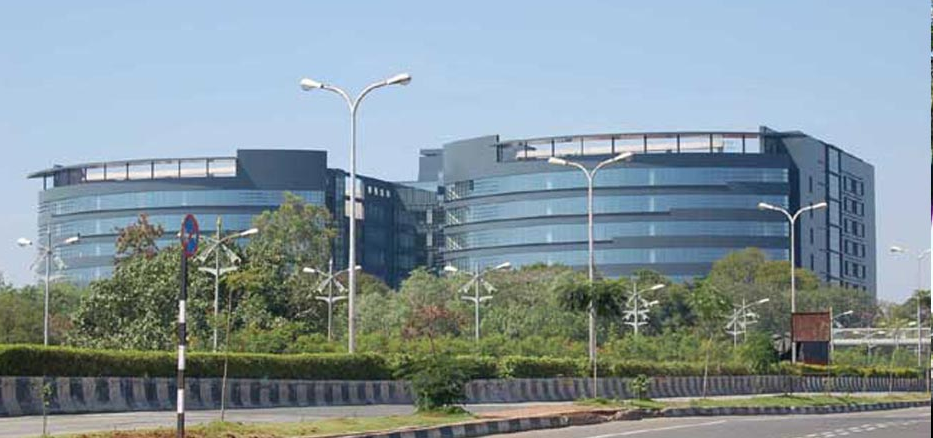
ICC-DGTP, Pimpri

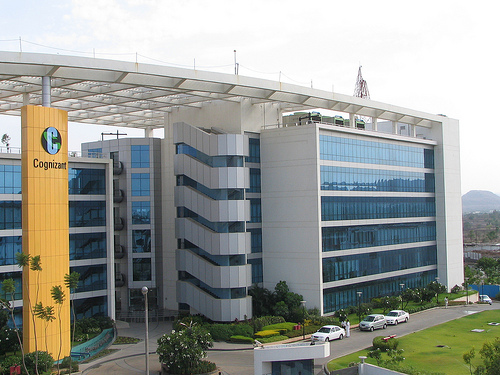
Cognizant, Hinjawadi

Pune is one of the major industrial hubs in Asia in which the majority contributes from the neighbourhood of Pimpri-Chinchwad. The formation of MIDC in 1962 resulted in a constant process of industrial land acquisition and the creation of required support infrastructure. Since then, there has been a massive influx of several European companies who continue to be keen on setting up manufacturing facilities in PCMC, Pune. It has a rapid growth in terms of the industries and most of the major automobile companies and their headquarters are located here. There is also a rapid growth in the software and IT departments.

Industrialization started in 1954 with the arrival of antibiotics research institute Hindustan Antibiotics Limited (HAL). PCMC, Pune is now home to the Indian operations of major automobile companies like Bajaj Auto, BEL Optronic Devices Limited, Daimler Chrysler, Force Motors, General Motors, Jaguar Land Rover, Kawasaki, Kinetic Engineering, Mahindra & Mahindra, Mercedes-Benz India, TATA Motors, Thermax and Volkswagen.

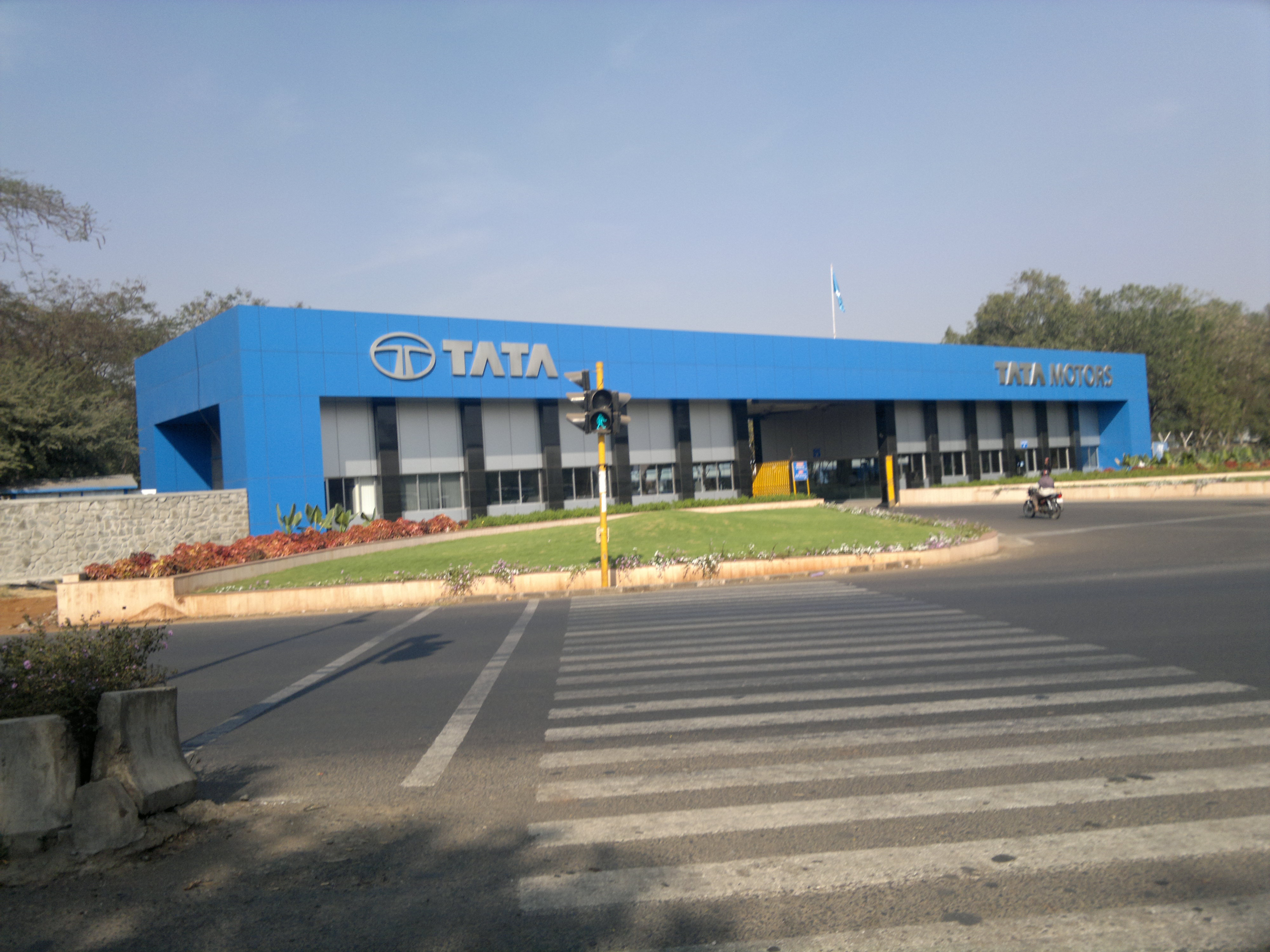
Tata Motors, Chinchwad

In addition to this, several heavy industries such as Alfa Laval, Atlas Copco, ATS Automation Tooling Systems, Bharat Forge, Bosch, Bridgestone, Finolex Group, Forbes Marshall, Geberit, General Electric, Hyundai Heavy Industries, IKEA, KSB Pumps, Lear Corporation, Lumax, Manitowoc Cranes, New Holland Agriculture, Sandvik, Sany, Schindler Group, Sigma Corporation, SKF, Suzlon, ThyssenKrupp, Varroc have their manufacturing units in the city.

The Rajiv Gandhi Infotech Park in Hinjawadi is a ₹60,000 crore (US$8.9 billion) project by the Maharashtra Industrial Development Corporation (MIDC). The IT Park encompasses an area of about 2,800 acres (11 km^{2}) and is home to over 800 IT companies of all sizes.

== Government and public services ==
On 4 March 1970, the villages of Pimpri, Chinchwad, Bhosari and Akurdi merged into a single municipal authority, the Pimpri Chinchwad Municipal Council, Pune. Two years later, the Pimpri Chinchwad New Town Development Authority, Pune was established. Its chief objective was to create a planned environment for the working population in the vicinity of their work place. On 11 October 1982, the Municipal Council was merged with seven surrounding villages and the PCNTDA area to form the a new Municipal Corporation (Pimpri Chinchwad Municipal Corporation, Pune, and it split apart from the Haveli taluka to become the 15th and newest of Pune district's talukas. The size of the city more than doubled in 1997 (from 84.51 km^{2} to 170.51 km^{2}.) with the addition (in part or in full) of 18 villages located at the periphery of the PCMC as it existed in 1982. Tathawade was added to the city in 2008, bringing the total area of the neighbourhood to 176.41 km^{2}.

=== Civic Administration ===
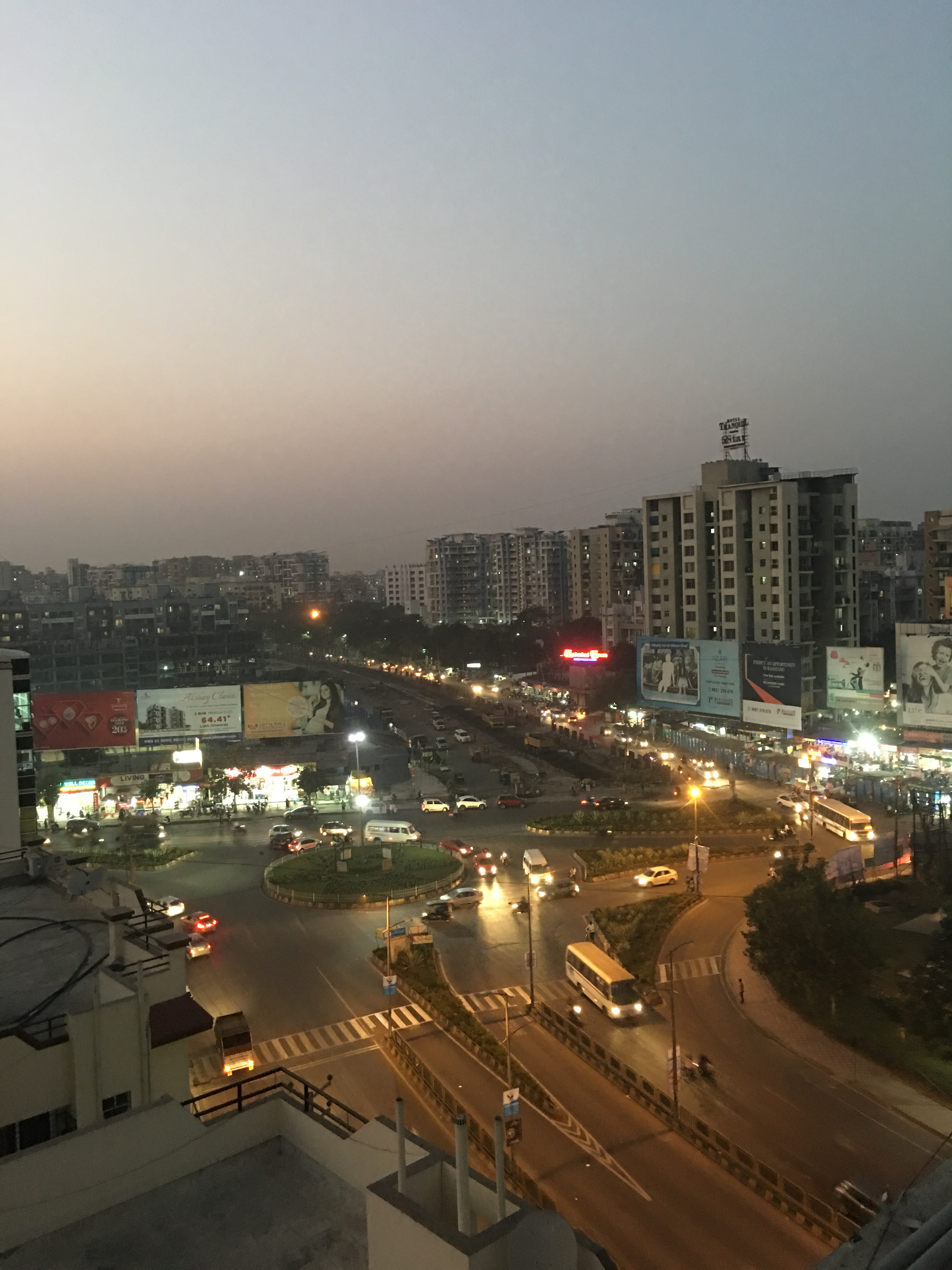
Pimple Saudagar

The Pimpri Chinchwad Municipal Corporation, Pune is the local governing body. It comprises two branches: the executive branch headed by the Municipal Commissioner, an IAS officer appointed by the Government of Maharashtra, and an elected deliberative branch, the general body, headed by the Mayor. Municipal elections are held every five years to elect councilors, popularly known as 'corporators', who form the general body of the PCMC. The corporators, in turn, elect the mayor and the deputy mayor. In the Municipal Elections held in February 2017, 128 corporators were elected to represent the 32 electoral wards (4 corporators per ward). While the position of the mayor is mostly ceremonial, the chief executive of the city is the Municipal Commissioner, appointed by the state government. The JNNURM award for Best Performing neighbourhood, under Sub-Mission for Urban Infrastructure and Governance, was given to PCMC, Pune in 2016. The "System of Assisting Residents and Tourist Through Helpline Information" (SARATHI), the grievance portal of the city, has gained national recognition and is a role model for other cities.

=== Municipal finance ===
According to financial data published on the CityFinance Portal of the Ministry of Housing and Urban Affairs, the Pimpri-Chinchwad Municipal Corporation reported total revenue receipts of ₹4,245 crore (US$510 million) and total expenditure of ₹3,965 crore (US$477 million) in 2022–23. Tax revenue accounted for about 26.1% of the total revenue, while the corporation received ₹2,196 crore in grants during the financial year.

==== Development Agencies ====
Pune Metropolitan Region Development Authority (PMRDA), which was on the cards since 1997, was formed on 31 March 2015 and is responsible for the integrated development of the PMR. Currently its jurisdiction extends over 7,256.46 km^{2} (2,802 sq mi) and includes the municipal corporations of Pimpri Chinchwad Municipal Corporation, Pune and Pune Municipal Corporation, three cantonment boards, seven municipal councils, 13 census towns and 842 villages.

Land use of Pimpri-Chinchwad
Sr. No.	Land use	Area in hectares	% of Total area
1	Residential	8,261	48%
2	Industrial	2,048	12%
3	Transportation and Roads	1,948	11%
4	Agriculture	1,382	8%
5	NDZ (Green Belt/Defence)	1,306	8%
6	Public and Semi-public	688	4%
7	Garden, Playground and re-creational	687	4%
8	Commercial	504	3%
9	Hillocks	168.5	1%
10	Water Bodies	168.5	1%
11	Public Utility	155	1%
Total		17,312	100%

==== Law and order ====
The PCMC Police in Pune is the law enforcement agency for the neighbourhood of PCMC, Pune. It was carved out of Pune City Police Department and took charge on 15 August 2018. It is a division of the Maharashtra Police and is headed by the Police Commissioner, an officer of the Indian Police Service.

=== Civic utilities ===
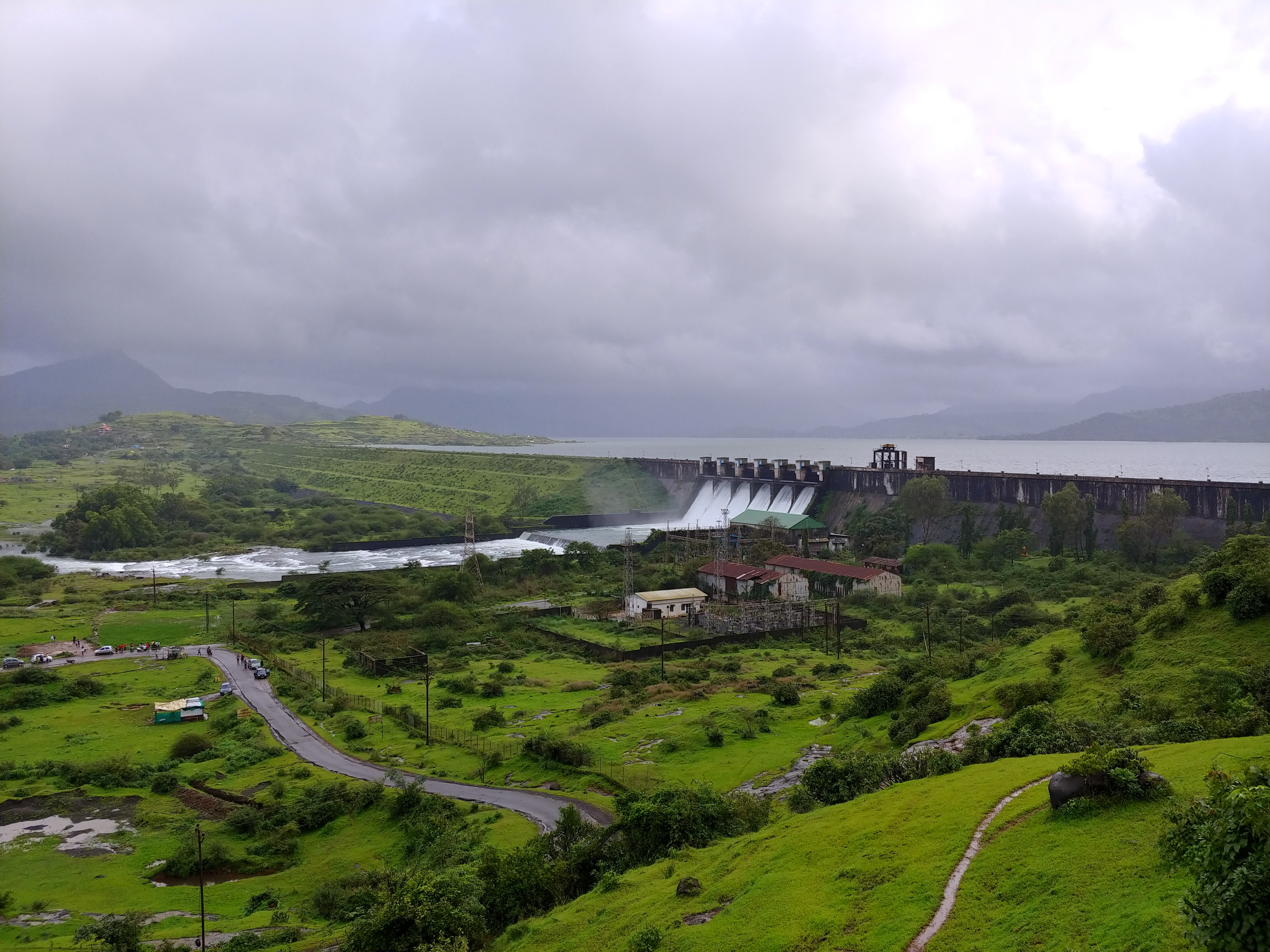
Pavana dam

The Pavana dam located 35 km from PCMC, Pune is the sole source of water for the city. The water lifted at the Ravet bund is pumped to the Nigdi filtration plant from where it distributed to the entire city. As of 2018, Pimpri-Chinchwad Municipal Corporation Administration provided around 450 million liters per day (MLD) of water to the city. This led to the generation of around 290 MLD of sewage, of which the civic body had capacity to treat only 240 MLD at its 13 sewage treatment plants, a problem that has persisted for years. The untreated water is let into the rivers which lead to several health and environmental problems. Similar problems in the areas of PMC as well as in the suburban areas, the rivers in the PMR are among the most polluted rivers in the state.

The state owned Maharashtra State Electricity Distribution Company Limited supplies electricity to the city. The power comes from thermal, hydro, gas and renewable sources such as solar, wind and sugarcane bagasse. Bharat Sanchar Nigam Limited (BSNL), owned by the central government, as well as private enterprises such as Vodafone, Bharti Airtel, Reliance, Idea Cellular, Aircel, Tata DoCoMo, Tata Teleservices, Virgin Mobile, and MTS India, are the leading telephone and cell phone service providers in the city.

== Transport ==
=== Air ===
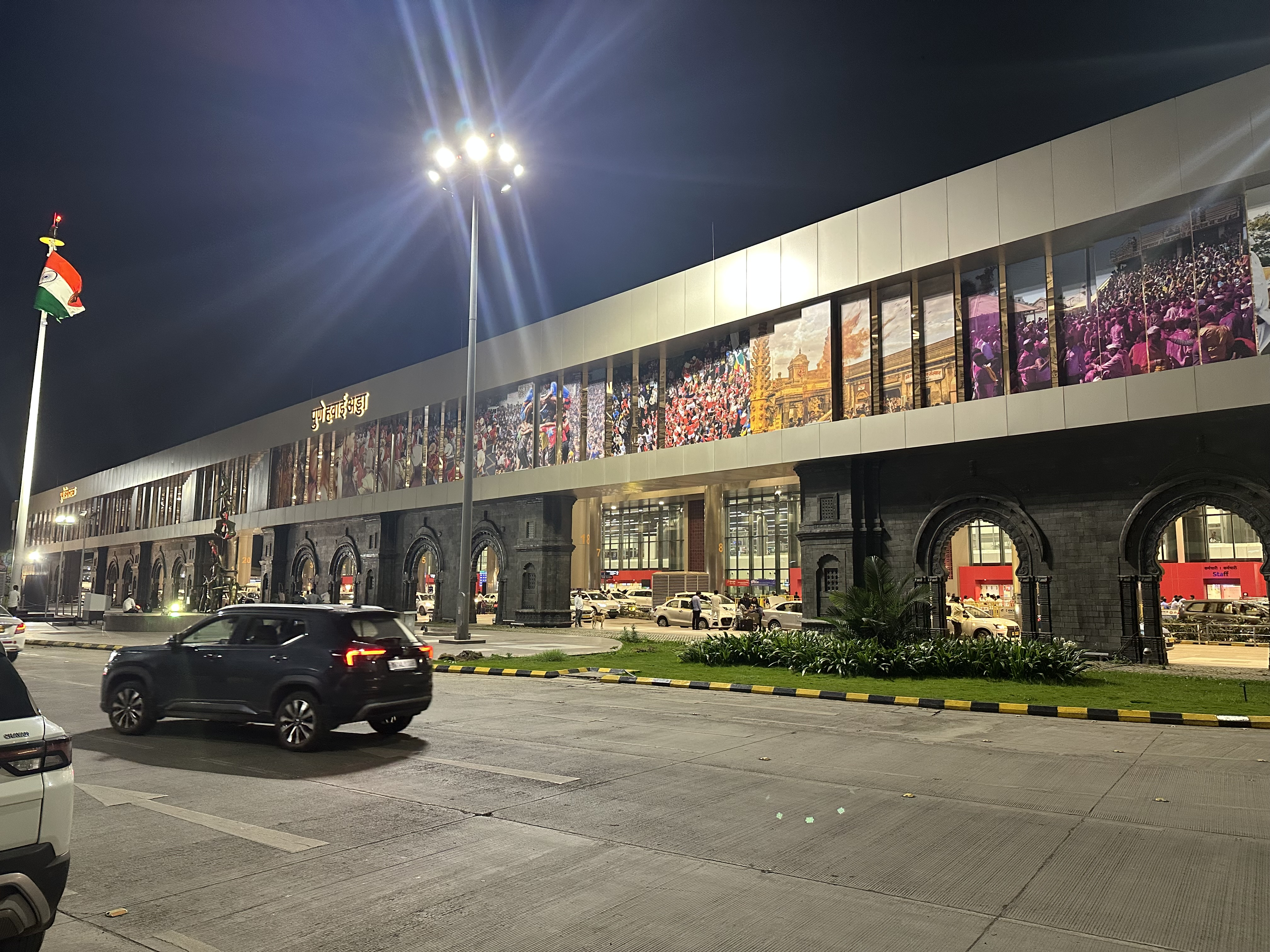
Pune Airport

The air gateway is the Pune International Airport located at Lohegaon which is about 19 km (12 mi) east of the neighborhood. It is operated by the Airports Authority of India. In addition to domestic flights to all major Indian cities, the airport serves international direct flights to Dubai (operated by Air India Express) and to Frankfurt (operated by Lufthansa). As of 2021, it is the 2nd busiest airport in the state and 13th busiest airport in India. The airport is awarded as best airport by hygiene measures in Asia-Pacific in 2020 by Airports Council International.

Due to the limited expansion options available, the airport will not be able to cope with the growing demand for air traffic into Pune. Hence, a greenfield airport for the Pune metropolitan region has been proposed. The Government of Maharashtra has entrusted the responsibility to Maharashtra Airport Development Company (MADC) for executing the Pune International Airport project. Probable sites for this project had earlier included areas around Talegaon Dabhade and Saswad near Pune. An area between Chakan and Rajgurunagar, around the villages of Chandus and Shiroli was under consideration. However, due to land acquisition issues, a new site has been proposed. The greenfield airport will be located near the villages of Ambodi, Sonori, Kumbharvalan, Ekhatpur-Munjawadi, Khanwadi, Pargaon Memane, Rajewadi, Aamble, Tekwadi, Vanpuri, Udachiwadi, Singapur near Saswad and Jejuri in Purandar taluka of Pune District in the Indian state of Maharashtra. The proposed airport in Purandar will be spread over 2,400 hectares. This airport will also boost trade from Pune and neighbouring districts as it will have its own dedicated cargo terminal.

=== Public transport ===
Public transport modes in PCMC limits include Suburban Railway, bus and Rainbow BRTS services operated by PMPML and auto rickshaws. Pune Metro, an urban mass rapid transit system is under construction in the twin cities. Uber and Ola Cabs also provide vehicle for hire services in the city.

==== Road ====
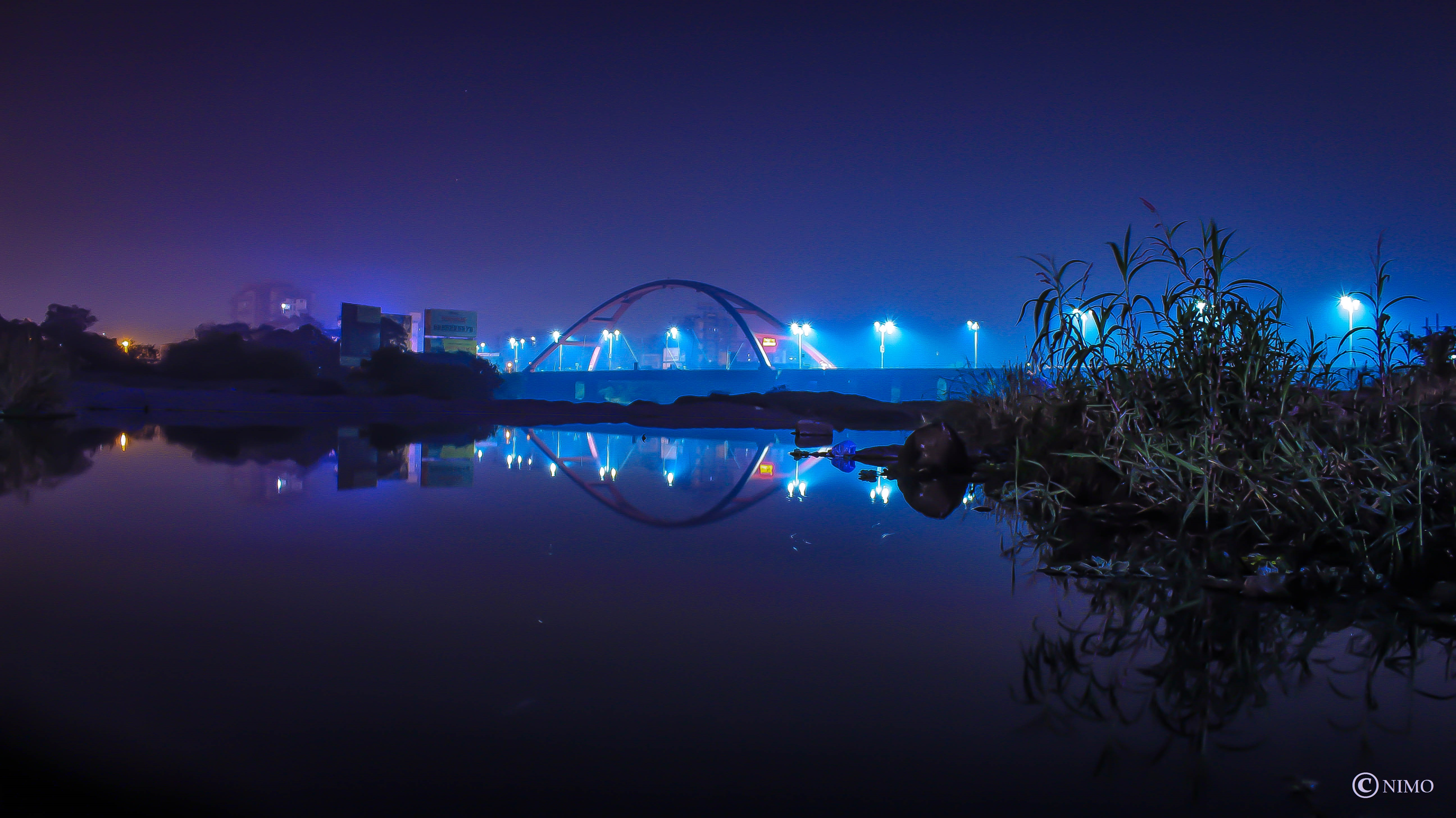
Ravet Bridge

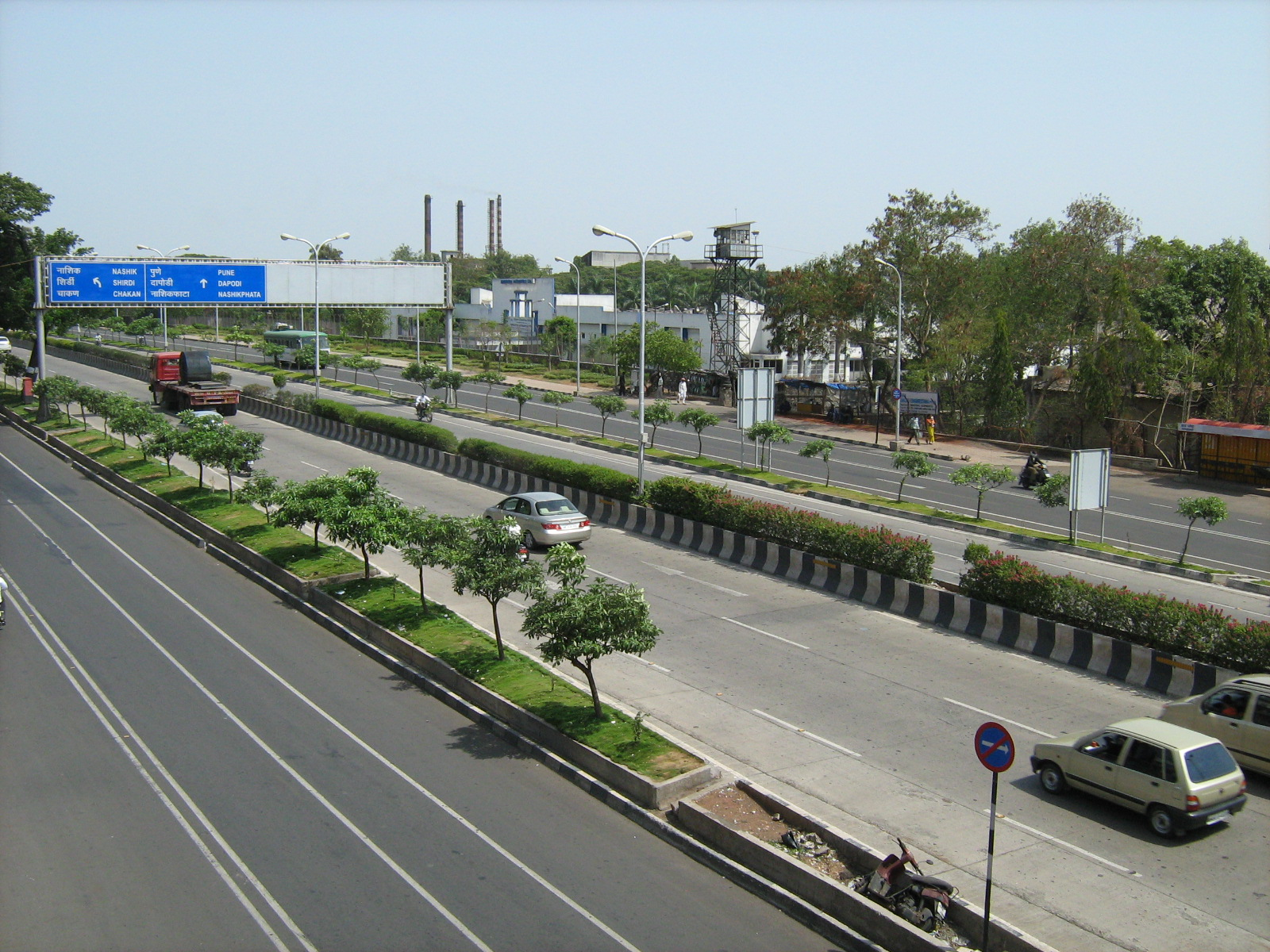
Grade separators on the NH 48

It is well connected to neighbouring cities via several highways. It has a 633-km long extensive network of roads connecting its various neighbourhoods. The NH 48 runs throughout the city and serves as the main connecting link for the PCMC and PMC. After the Mumbai–Pune Expressway was opened in 2002, this road came to be known as Old Mumbai–Pune Road. It starts in the suburb of Shivajinagar (earlier Bhamburde) and passes through the suburbs of Khadki cantonment, Bopodi, Dapodi, Kasarwadi, Pimpri, Chinchwad, Nigdi, Dehu Road cantonment, Kivale, Mamurdi, Gahunje, Talegaon Dabhade, and Vadgaon Maval all the way up to Mumbai.The NH 60 originates at Nashik Phata at Kasarwadi is another important road passes through the suburbs of Kasarwadi, Bhosari, Chikhli, Moshi, Chimbali, and Chakan all the way up to Nashik. The Giant Metrewave Radio Telescope in Khodad is off this road. The Pimpri-Chinchwad link road connects the suburbs of Pimpri and Chinchwad, as one of the alternative roads to Mumbai–Pune Road. The Mumbai Pune Expressway that originates at Kiwale just outside the city, is India's first 6-lane wide concrete, access-controlled tolled expressway. It spans a distance of 94.5 km connecting Mumbai, the capital of Maharashtra state and the financial capital of India, with Pune, the cultural and educational capital of Maharashtra. The expressway, which was fully operationalized in 2002, introduced new levels of speed and safety in automobile transportation to Indian roads. It is one of India's busiest roads.

Three ring roads are being planned for the convenience of heavy traffic.

==== Bus service ====
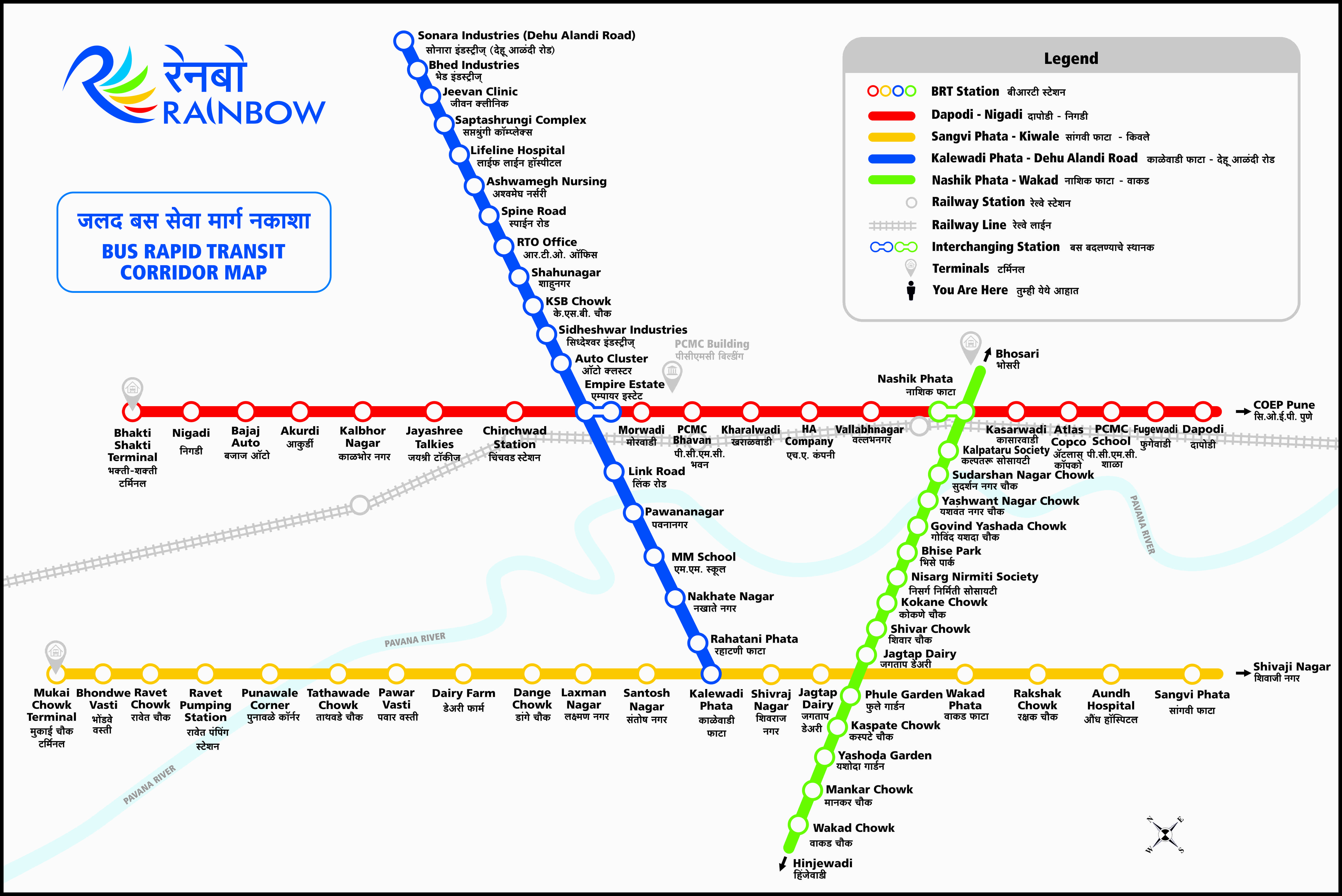
BRTS Route Map for Pimpri Chinchwad

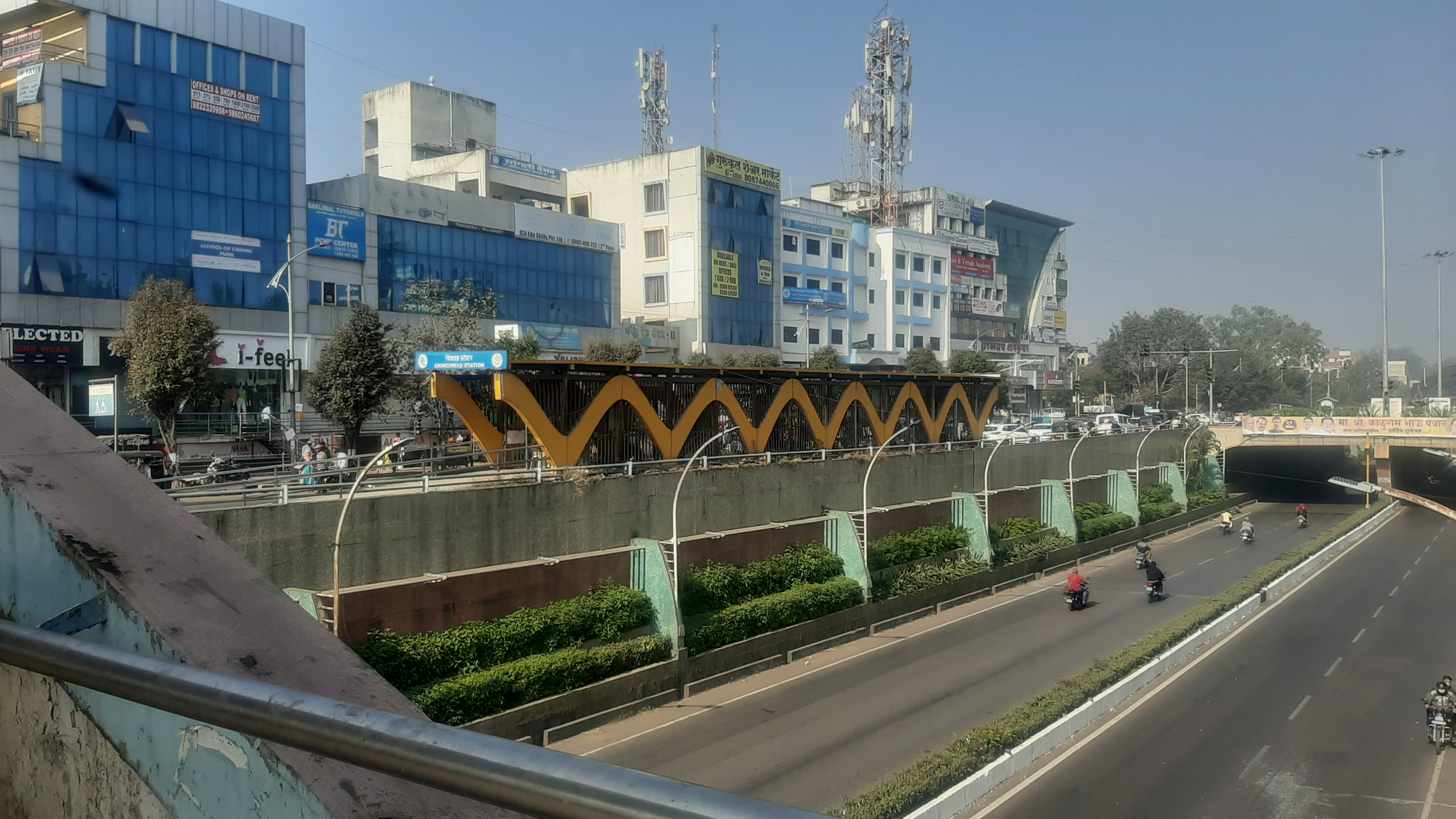
Rainbow BRTS terminus at Chinchwad

Until 2007, PCMC, Pune served by its own public transport bus service provider, the Pimpri Chinchwad Municipal Transport, Pune. On 19 October 2007, it was merged with the Pune Municipal Transport, Pune that served it's historic neighbourhood of Pune to form the Pune Mahanagar Parivahan Mahamandal Limited (PMPML; lit. Pune Metropolitan Transport Corporation Ltd.). PMPML runs buses on 371 routes that cover a radius of 20 km around the city of Pune, India. It also runs services on BRT corridors under the brand name Rainbow BRTS. As of May 2018, there are two operating BRT corridors in PCMC limits with a combined length of 22.5 km, while work is underway on three other corridors with a total length 28 km. Although the BRTS project has been deemed a failure in the historic PMC, PCMC claims that the two BRT corridors, Sangvi-Kiwale and Nashik Phata-Wakad, have seen a rise in ridership after they became operation in 2015. The Maharashtra State Road Transport Corporation operates buses from its main station at Vallabh Nagar, Pimpri to all major cities and towns in Maharashtra as well as in the neighbouring states. Private companies also run bus services throughout India.

==== Rail ====
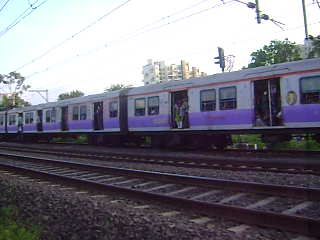
Pune Suburban Train

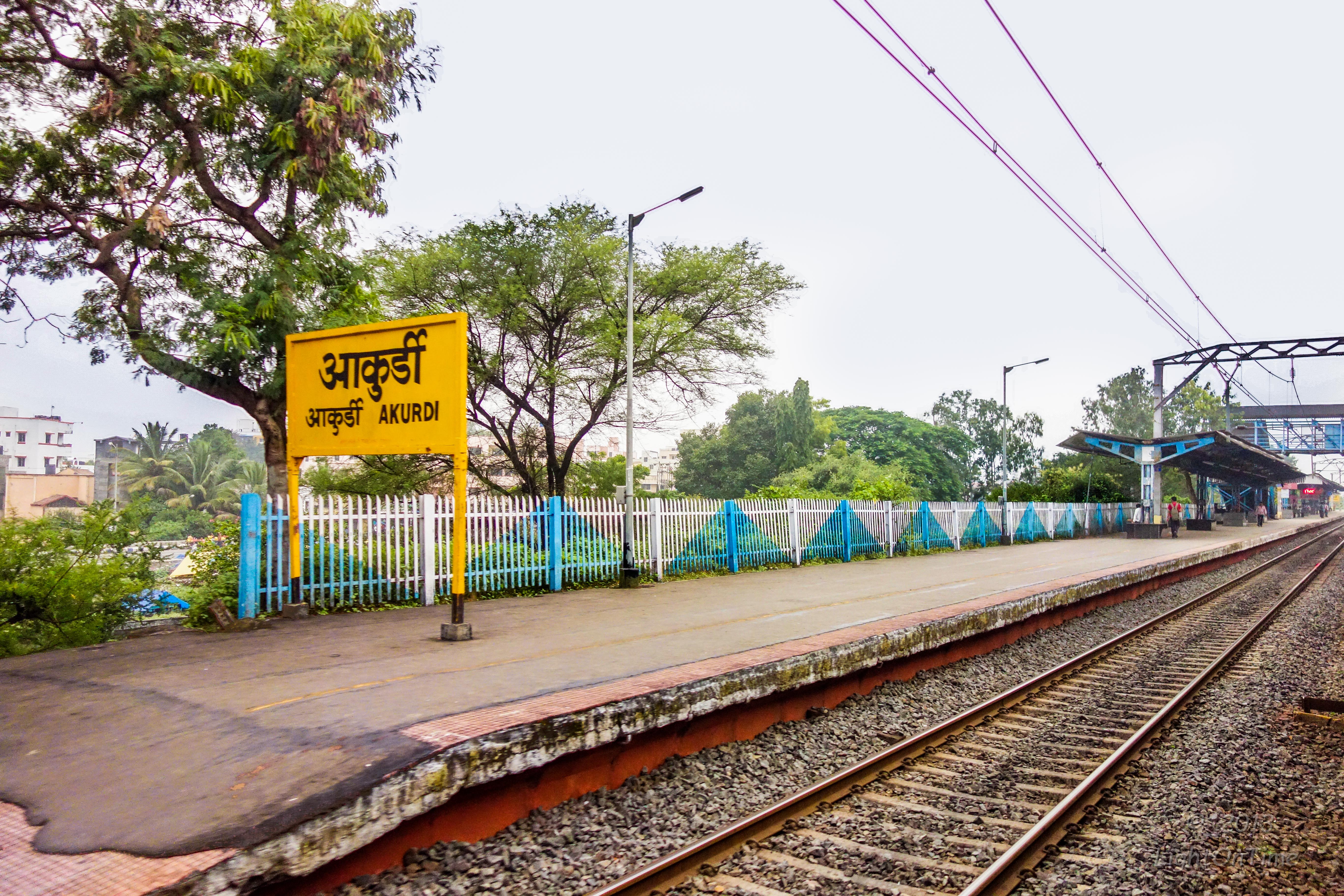
Akurdi railway station

Pimpri Chinchwad is served by five railway stations, Chinchwad, Akurdi, Pimpri, Kasarwadi and Dapodi, on the Pune Suburban Railway as well as the Mumbai Dadar–Solapur sections of the Indian Railways (Central zone). Local trains (EMUs) connect PCMC, Pune to its historic neighbourhood of Pune and the hill station of Lonavala, while daily express trains connect it to Mumbai. Daily express trains through Pune Junction connect the city to other parts of the country. Pune Suburban Railway, connecting PCMC, Pune to its historic core and its suburbs in Pune District, Maharashtra. It is operated by Central Railway (CR). The system operates on two routes, Pune Junction–Lonavala and its part Pune Junction–Talegaon. 18 trains operate on Pune Junction–Lonavala route and 5 trains operate on Pune Junction–Talegaon route.

==== Metro ====
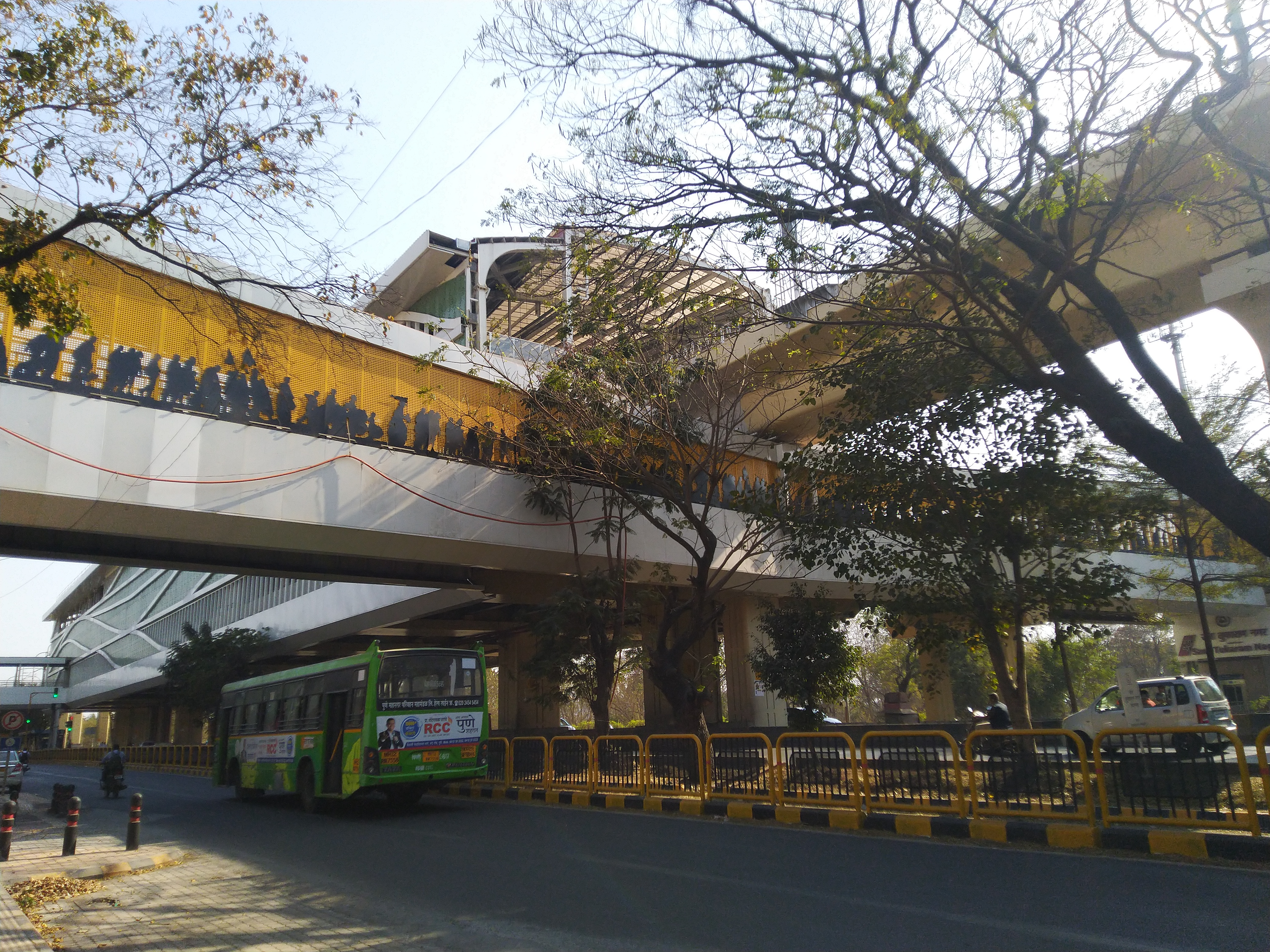
Sant Tukaram Nagar metro station

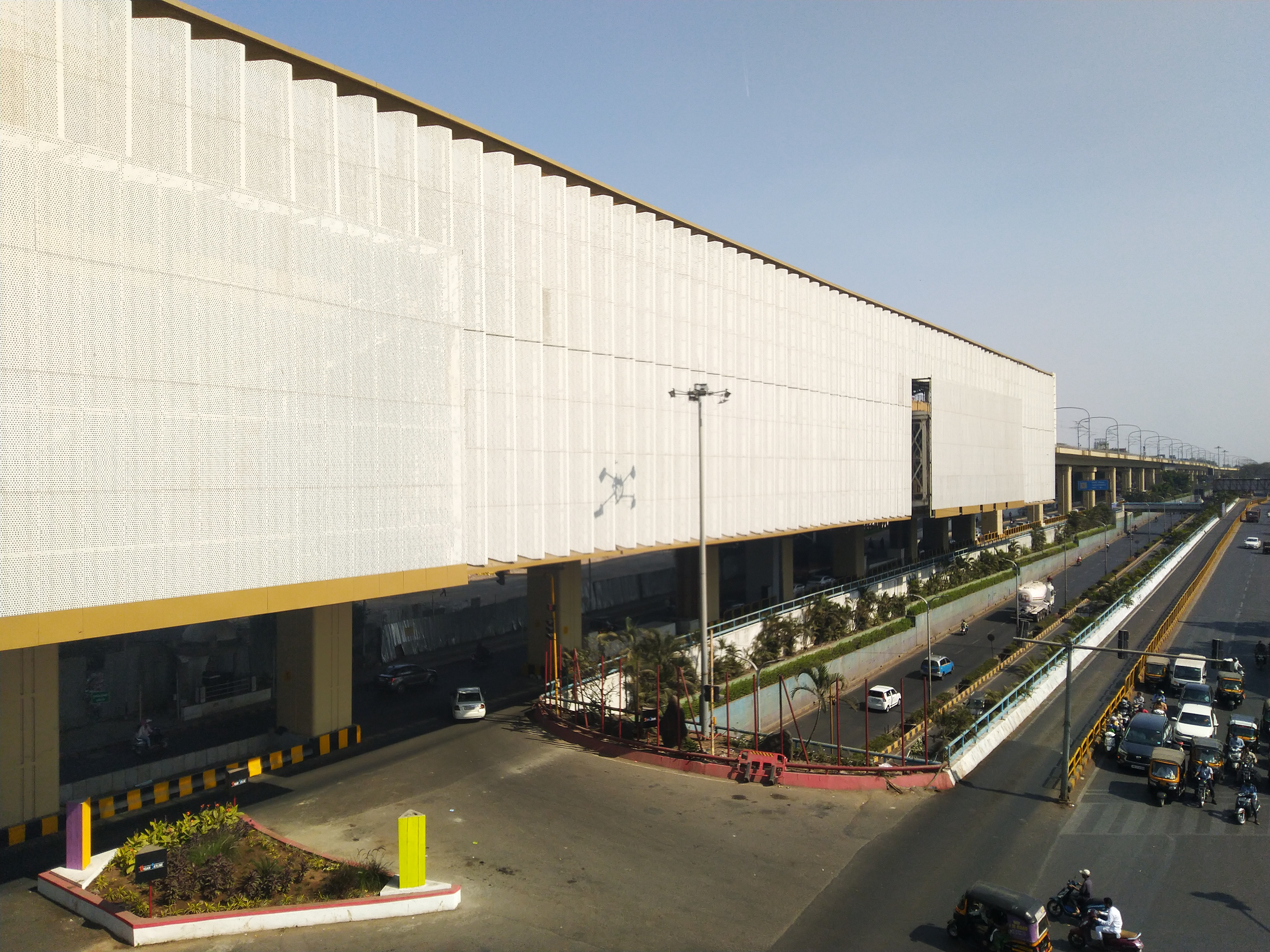
PCMC Bhavan metro station

Pune Metro, a mass rapid transit system, was inaugurated in March 2022. The system comprises 3 lines with a total length of 54.58 km. As of 2022, Pimpri-Chinchwad has been served by 6 metro stations of Purple Line which is PCMC Bhavan, Sant Tukaram Nagar, Nashik Phata, Kasarwadi, Phugewadi, Dapodi. The 16.59 km Line 1 PCMC Bhavan – Swargate will be elevated between PCMC Bhavan to Range Hills, from where it will run underground. Line 2 will run from Vanaz to Ramwadi covering a distance of 14.66 km on an elevated viaduct. Lines 1 and 2 are expected to be operational in 2021. The 23.33-km elevated Line 3 will run from the Rajiv Gandhi Infotech Park in Hinjawadi via Balewadi to Civil Court. All three lines will align at the Civil Court interchange station. The detailed project report (DPR) was prepared for the initial two lines by Delhi Metro Rail Corporation which was approved by the State government in 2012 and by the Central government in December 2016. Out of the two lines, Line 1 will run through PCMC limits from PCMC Bhavan to Dapodi and further to Swargate in Pune, India. A detailed project report is being prepared for the extension of the line up to Nigdi. The project is being implemented by MahaMetro, a 50:50 joint venture of the State and Central governments. Line 3 from Hinjawadi to Civil Court, Shivajinagar was approved by the State and Central governments in January and March 2018, respectively. The 23.3-km line is being implemented by PMRDA on a public-private partnership basis and will have a station at Wakad in PCMC limits. Another metro route connecting Hinjawadi to Moshi via Nashik Phata, Bhosari is also being contemplated.

==== Personal transport ====
Rapid urbanization has led to the population of the city to double from 2001 to 2017. In the same period, the number of vehicles has increased of 700%. Like its neighbouring Pune, motorized two-wheelers dominate the streets. At the rate of 663 vehicles per 1000 residents, a total of 1.57 million vehicles are registered in the city in 2018, of which 1.17 million are two-wheelers. Public transportation in the city has not been able to keep up with the demand and is infamous for its unreliability leading to a constant upward trend in the number of vehicles. Unsurprisingly, the whopping number of vehicles has led to several problems including air pollution, noise pollution and traffic congestion.

== Culture ==
=== Festivals and events ===
Like most Indian cities, a number of festival are celebrated across all communities in the city including Ganeshotsav, Navaratri, Dussehra, Janmashtami, Dahi Handi and Onam Holi, Diwali, Eid al-fitr, Eid al-Adha, Christmas, Buddha Purnima, Cheti Chand, Chalio, and several others. The birth anniversary celebrations of historical figures like Chhatrapati Shivaji, the founder of the Maratha Empire, and Dr. Babasaheb Ambedkar, the principal architect of Indian Constitution, among others are also celebrated with great pomp and show. The national holidays of Republic Day and Independence Day are also celebrated. Individual towns also organize annual village fairs which are dedicated to the local deity. The Bhairavnath fair in Bhosari is perhaps the well-known village fair for its controversial bullock cart race.

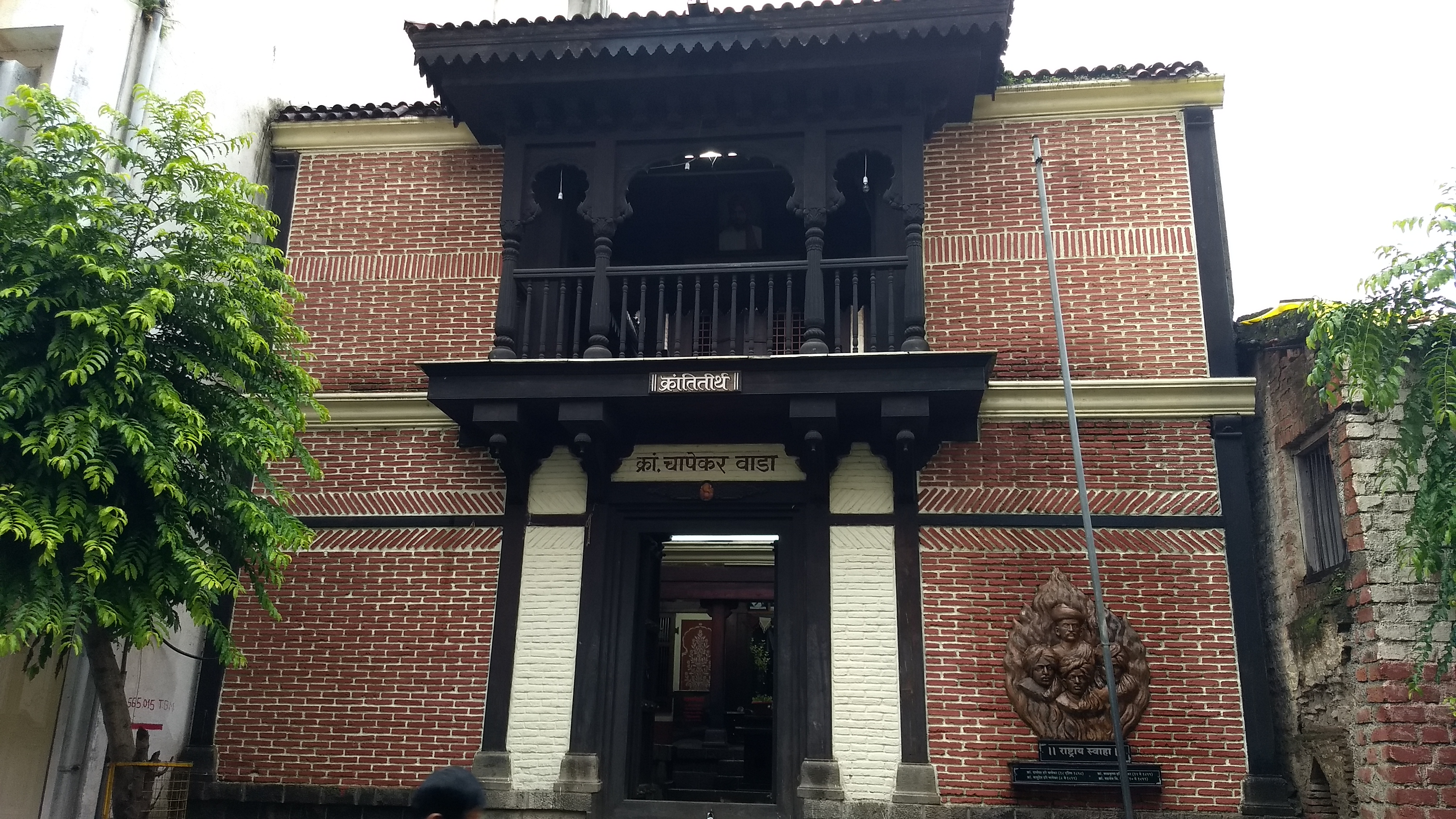
Chapekar Wada in Chinchwad was the residence of the Chapekar brothers

The PCMC festival is an annual cultural event held in the city. It was started by the Pimpri Chinchwad Municipal Corporation, Pune in 1996 under the name 'Ganesh Festival' as it used to be organized on the occasion of Ganeshotsav. Since 2004, the PCMC stopped organizing the festival and it was kept alive by the PCMC Social Club. Since 2014, the festival is not organized during Ganeshotsav but at another time of the year. Pavanāthaḍi Jatrā (Marathi: पवनाथडी जत्रा) is an annual event organized by the Women and Child Welfare Committee of the PCMC. It is a three to five day long exhibition cum sale of goods produced by women's self-help groups in the city and features over 300 stalls. The city also participates in the Pune International Film Festival with screening of several films at a cinema in the city limits.

== Tourism ==
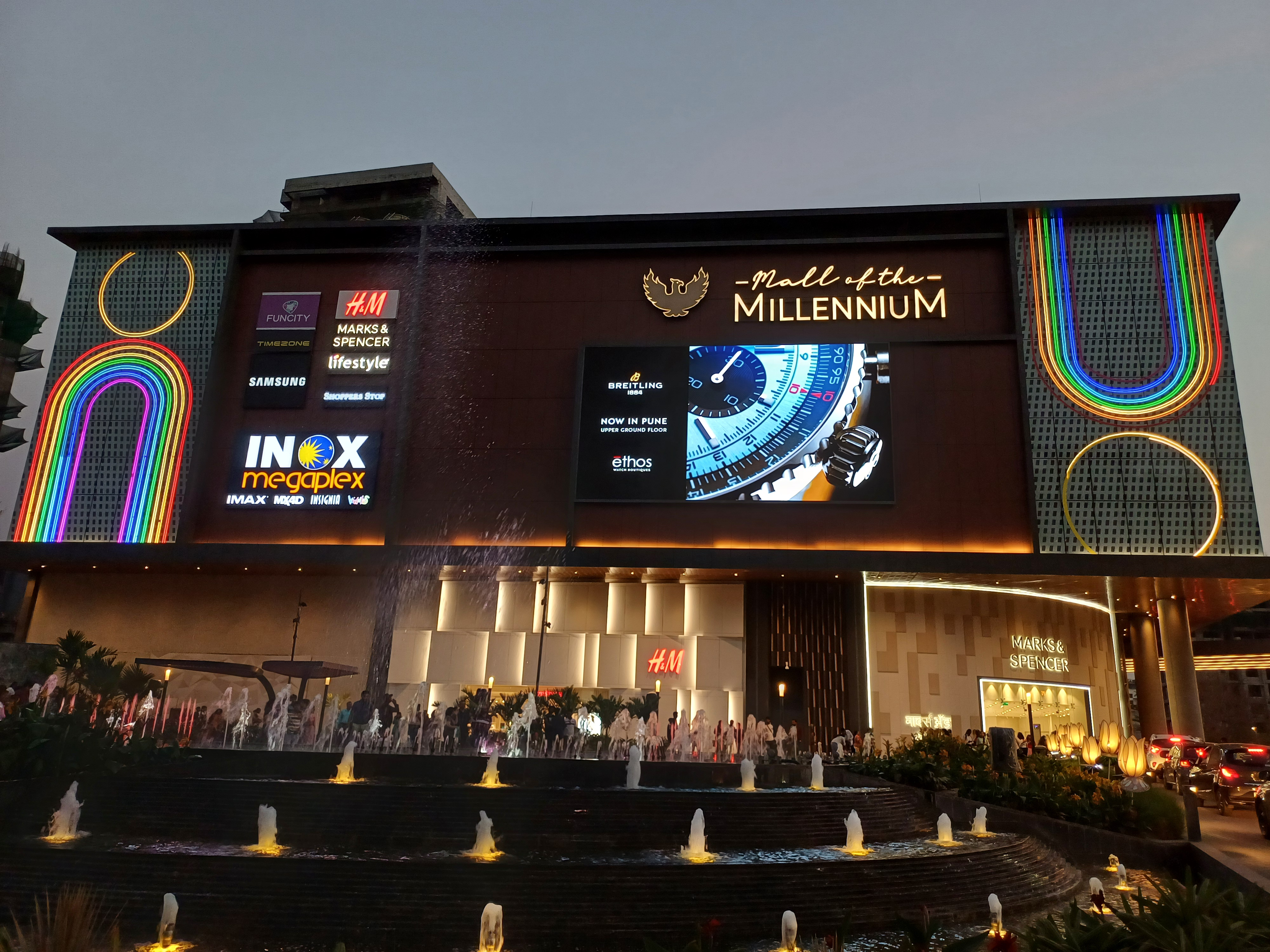
Phoenix Mall of the Millennium in Wakad

=== Parks ===
Durga Tekdi and Bhakti-Shakti are one of main public parks in Pune. The Bhakti Shakti garden hosted the second largest national flag of India at 351 ft. The Boat Club Garden, Thergaon on the bank of Pawana River hosts kids play area, toy train ride, 15 meter high watch tower, boating and rafting. The city also has a zoo named after Nisargakavi Bahinabai Chaudhari in Chinchwad East. A lake garden is also located close to the zoo called the Bird Valley because of the water birds like cranes which come migrating here. Appu Ghar also known as Indira Gandhi Udyan is an amusement park located in the Pradhikaran area.

Pimpri Chinchwad Science Park, Pune is one of the latest tourist attraction and activity based Science Centre of Pune region. The Science Centre houses Galleries on different themes of Science & Technology, Activity area, Inflatable Taramandal and an Auditorium. It also has an open air Science Park spread over 3.5 acres. Most of the exhibits in the science centre and science park are interactive in nature and visitors can explore science in an entertaining way.

=== Recreation ===
There are ten public swimming pools run by Pimpri-Chinchwad Municipal Corporation. Chapekar wada in Chinchwadgaon, the residence of the revolutionary Chapekar brothers has been restored and is now a memorial cum museum dedicated to their life and displays swords and weapons used by freedom fighters during the struggle for Indian independence.

Ramkrushna More Prekshagruha in Chinchwad, Acharya Atre Rangmandir in Sant Tukaramnagar, Ankushrao Landage Natyagruha in Bhosari, Nilu Phule Rangmandir in Sangvi are the auditoria in the city. There is a fort in Punawale that was built by and named after the Peshwa Minister Sardar Borge. There is also a Vaishno Devi Temple in Pimpri.

=== Shopping and Malls ===
Pimpri market is one of the shopping street in Pune for clothing, electronics and jewellery. There are several cinema halls as well as shopping malls in the city.

== Sports ==
=== Cricket ===
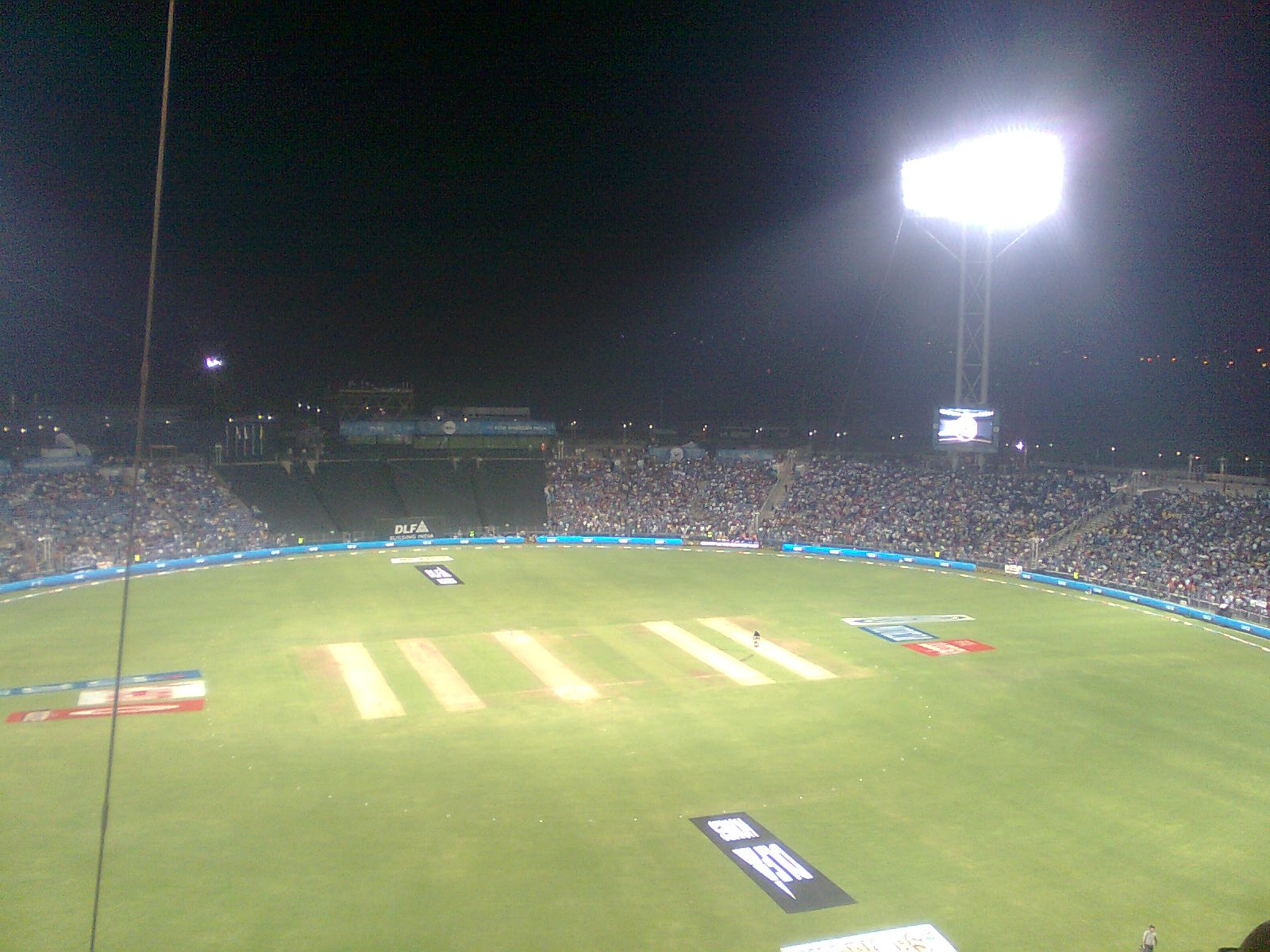
View of Maharashtra Cricket Association Stadium at night

Cricket is one of the most popular sports in this city. Maharashtra Cricket Association Stadium, Gahunje (also known as MCA Stadium), inaugurated in 2012, hosts both one day internationals and test matches with a seating capacity of 37,000 spectators. It serves as the home stadium for the Maharashtra cricket team including headquarters for the Maharashtra Cricket Association.

=== Hockey ===
PCMC Hockey Stadium also known as The Major Dhyanachand Stadium is a field hockey stadium in the city of Pune, India. It has a seating capacity of 5,000 people. It serves as the home ground of the hockey franchisee based in Pune Strykers, for World Series Hockey. It was built in 1993, was the first polygrass stadium of the district. Women's hockey matches of National Games which was held here in 1993.

=== Football ===
Annasaheb Magar PCMC Stadium is a multi purposed stadium owned and managed by the PCMC Administration. The ground was named after Indian National Congress leader Annasaheb Magar who was Member of Parliament from 1977 to 1980 from Khed

=== Rowing ===
CME rowing channel, Dapodi is Asia's second largest rowing channel after China.

== Education ==
PCMC Administration runs 136 public schools, locally called 'Municipality Schools'. According to the PCMC Website, the neighbourhood also has 208 private schools that are run by individuals or educational trusts. Public schools are affiliated to the State Board. Private schools vary in their choice curriculum and may follow the State Board or one of the two central boards of education, the CBSE or CISCE.

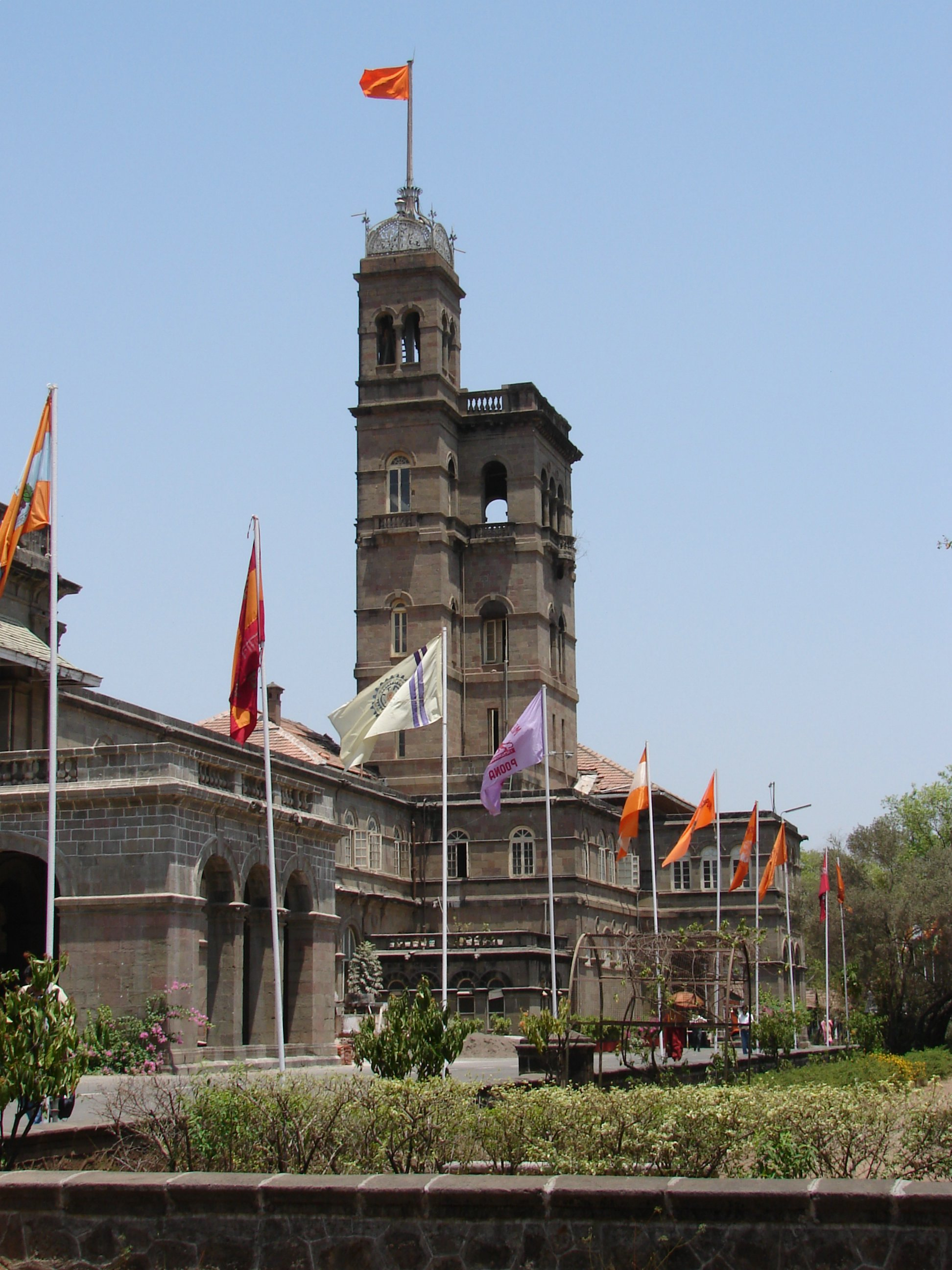
University of Pune

According to the 2011 Census, the city has 75 colleges (undergraduate and above), three medical colleges and 3 engineering colleges. Most colleges in PCMC, Pune are affiliated to the Savitribai Phule Pune University. The College of Military Engineering is located in the Dapodi area. The city is also home to the National AIDS Research Institute (NARI) of the Indian Council of Medical Research established in October 1992 in Bhosari MIDC. Central Institute of Road Transport is also located in Bhosari MIDC.

=== Schools ===
- Amrita Vidyalayam, Nigdi
- City International School
- DES's H.A. Highschool, Pimpri
- Elpro International School, Chinchwad
- Global Indian International School
- Hindustan Antibiotics School
- Jai Hind High School and Junior College, Pimpri
- Jnana Prabodhini
- S.N.B.P. International School
- St. Andrew's High School Chinchwad
- St. Ursula's High School Nigdi
- The Genius English Medium School, Hinjawadi
- VIBGYOR Group of Schools
- Vidya Niketan School
- Vidyanand Bhavan High School, Nigdi
- Wisdom World School, Wakad

=== Colleges ===
- D Y Patil College of Engineering, Pimpri.
- International Institute of Information Technology, Hinjewadi.
- Jayawantrao Sawant College of Engineering
- Pimpri Chinchwad Polytechnic
- Pimpri Chinchwad College of Engineering, Akurdi.
- Pimpri Chinchwad College of Engineering and Research, Ravet.
- S. B. Patil Institute of Management, Akurdi.
- S B Patil Junior College, Ravet.
- National AIDS Research Institute, Bhosari.

== International relations ==
- Gunsan, South Korea
- Xiangyang, China

== Notable people ==
- Ruturaj Gaikwad – professional cricketer, played for India, plays for Maharashtra cricket team, Chennai Super Kings in IPL.
- Mukta Barve - Marathi actress
- Bhushan Pradhan - Marathi actor

== See also ==
- Pimpri
- Chinchwad
