= Pimpri Chinchwad Science Park =

- Established: 8 February 2013; 13 years ago
- Location: Pimpri Chinchwad, Pune
- Coordinates: 18.6403°N 73.8000°E
- Type: Science and Technology Museum
- Website: pcsciencepark.org

Pimpri Chinchwad Science Park is a science center in Pimpri Chinchwad, Pune, India built by the Pimpri-Chinchwad Municipal Corporation in 2013. The complex houses a Science Centre, museum, an art gallery, an auditorium, an Amphitheatre and a planetarium.

== Science Centre ==
The science centre forms the main part of the complex. It houses a Fun Science Gallery which shows science exhibits. The centre is divided into 7 core areas that are:

- Automobile
- Fun science
- Energy
- Climate change
- 3D show
- Science park
- Dino Park
- Amphitheatre
- Planetarium
- Art Gallery
- Auditorium

== See also ==
- List of science centers#Asia
