= Durga Tekdi =

Durga Tekdi is a hill in Nigdi Pune. During the festival of durga puja, the park is open till 10 pm and a must visit as you can view the city skyline .It is visited by residents of Nigdi. The tekdi (hill) derives its name from the Durga temple on the hill. Durga Tekdi, also known as "Durgadevi park", is one of the aspects of Pimpri Chinchwad corporation and over 160,000 trees have been planted on an area of 75 hectares. Plants such as rain tree, pelthohorum, ficus, neem, glyricidia, suru, sisoo, kasid, and subabul have been planted. Lawn exists on over 3 acres of land, and has been maintained for recreation purposes. Recently 59,805 trees have been planted on 92 hectares of land. The park also has a waterfall and floating fountain. The best period to visit this hill is either in the monsoon or in the winters.

== Indira Gandhi Udyan ==
Adjacent to Durga Tekdi, there is an amusement park, Indira Gandhi Udyan (Appu Ghar), which is built on the lines of Appu Ghar in Delhi. The layout plan of this park matches with the designs of various rides and games. The ethnic huts and family swings add to the layout.
