= Moshi, Pune =

Moshi
- Neighborhood
- Location in Pimpri-Chinchwad, India
- Coordinates: 18.6801°N 73.8502°E
- Country: India
- State: Maharashtra
- City: Pimpri-Chinchwad

Languages
  - Official: Marathi
- Time zone: UTC+5:30 (IST)
- ISO 3166 code: IN-MH
- Website: www.pcmcindia.gov.in

Moshi Pradhikaran is a planned neighborhood in the city of Pimpri-Chinchwad, India. It hosts the International Convention & Exhibition Centre, Moshi High Street, The District Centre, Regional Transport Office, Safari Park, College of Engineering, Landscaped Gardens & Wide driveways.

It is accessible by Maharashtra State Road Transport Corporation buses and PMPML buses as well.
