= 2024 Pune Porsche car crash =

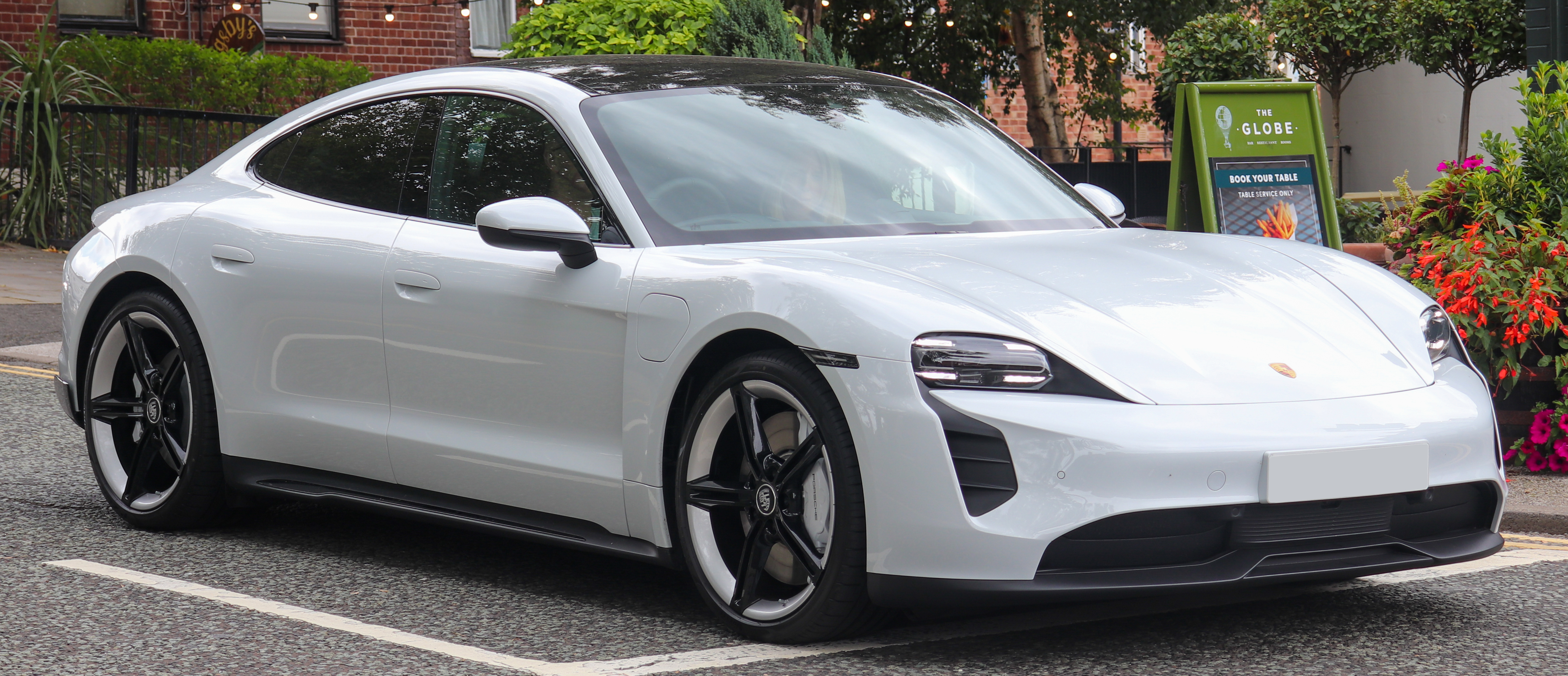
- A Porsche Taycan similar to that driven by Agarwal
- Date: 19 May 2024 (2 years ago)
- Time: 2:30 AM IST
- Location: Kalyani Nagar, Pune, Maharashtra, India
- Cause: Drunk driving, overspeeding
- Outcome: Arrests and ongoing legal proceedings
- Deaths: Aneesh Awadhiya, Ashwini Koshta
- Accused: Vedant Agarwal

On 19 May 2024, Vedant Agarwal, aged 17, killed two motorbike riders in an automobile collision in the Kalyani Nagar neighbourhood of Pune, Maharashtra, India. The deceased, Aneesh Awadhiya and Ashwini Koshta, were residents of Madhya Pradesh. Media reports emphasised that Agarwal was driving an unregistered Porsche Taycan, considered a fully electric luxury vehicle, and that he had purchased and consumed alcohol before the incident.

Agarwal's father brought Maharashtra Legislative Assembly member Sunil Tingre to the police station. Thereafter, the police gave Agarwal preferential treatment, including delaying the test of his blood alcohol content. The Juvenile Justice Board gave the accused minor bail within hours, creating a nation-wide controversy regarding the derailment of justice.

The 50-year-old father was taken into custody and questioned about the blood sample swap. The juvenile's 77-year-old grandfather is accused of abducting the driver who was present at the time of the accident and forcing him to take the blame.

Agarwal was in an observation home until June 25. On June 25, the Bombay High Court termed the custody in observation home illegal and ordered to release him and keep him under custody of his parental aunt. He was questioned about his activities before the accident and the events at Sassoon Hospital but gave vague answers. Investigation revealed that Agarwal's blood sample was swapped with his mother's, implicating both parents and the hospital staff in the conspiracy.

On 16 December 2025, the Bombay High Court rejected the bail pleas of the accused, including the family of the driver and medical staff managing the test samples

On 2 February 2026, the Supreme Court of India granted bail to Amar Gaikwad, Aditya Avinash Sood and Ashish Mittal, involved in tampering of blood samples. Another doctor involved was also granted bail on 27 February.

On 10 March 2026, Vishal Agarwal was granted bail by the Supreme Court of India, stating that he has been in jail for 22 months and had made a case for bail.

== Incident ==
At 10:30 PM on 18 May 2024, Vedant Agarwal and a few of his friends entered Cosie Restaurant and Bar in Koregaon Park to celebrate his CBSE 12th Board Examination. The restaurant served the group of minors alcohol till midnight, after which the restaurant refused to serve them anymore and asked them to leave. The 17-year-old boy paid ₹48,000 (equivalent to ₹51,000 or US$530 in 2026) for the drinks for the group using his grandfather's credit card and then left.

The group then proceeded to Blak Club at Marriott Suites at 12:25 AM. They once again managed to order and were served alcohol. They departed at 1:22 AM after settling a ₹20,000 (equivalent to ₹21,000 or US$220 in 2026) bill.

After spending some time in the area, Vedant began driving towards his house under the influence of alcohol in an unregistered Porsche Taycan Turbo S owned by his father. Around 2:30 AM at Kalyani Nagar junction, he lost control of the car, which was speeding at around 200 kilometres per hour (124 mph), and crashed into a motorcycle, killing Aneesh Awadhiya and Ashwini Koshta. They were flung 5 metres (16 ft) into the air. Koshta, who was the pillion rider, died on the spot, while Awadhiya later succumbed to his injuries in a hospital. They were both 24-year-old IT workers from Madhya Pradesh.

A mob at the scene dragged people out of the car—Vedant, two of his friends, and his family's chauffeur—and began beating up Vedant. The police arrived after a few minutes and took Vedant to the Yerawada police station.

== Aftermath ==
Fifty minutes after the incident, at 3:20 AM on 19 May 2024, politician Sunil Tingre went to the police station on request from the father of the accused. Tingre is a member of the Maharashtra Legislative Assembly and Ajit Pawar's Nationalist Congress Party. It is alleged that the police then provided preferential treatment to the minor as the charges against him were under Section 185 of the Motor Vehicles Act, which deals with drunk driving offences. Moreover, the blood alcohol test of the minor was delayed by over eight hours—enough time for alcohol to be flushed out of the body. The minor was taken to Sassoon Hospital around 9 am and the sample was collected around 11 AM. The minor was allegedly served pizzas and burgers while in custody, though this was denied by Pune Police Commissioner Amitesh Kumar. Doctors and police examined a blood sample which was allegedly swapped with blood from Agarwal's mother.

Hours later, the Juvenile Justice Board granted the minor bail on the conditions that the minor has to work with Yerwada Police for 15 days, write 300-words essay on road accidents, undergo treatment for his drinking habit, and take counselling sessions.

The decision of the court to award the accused bail, with its order to write a 300-word essay in an incident with two casualties, triggered outrage across the country. Allegations had been made over leniency by the Juvenile Justice Board. Following the outcry of the preferential treatment and miscarriage of justice, MLA Sunil Tingre denied the allegation that he pressurized the police, and maintained that he visited the police station in the middle of the night as a responsible representative of the public.

On 20 May 2024, after the outcry, the Maharashtra Deputy Chief Minister and Home Minister Devendra Fadnavis travelled to Pune and met with the Pune Police chief. He then addressed a press conference, expressing "shock and surprise" over the order passed by the Juvenile Justice Board. Fadnavis said the police later went to a higher court, which directed the police to approach the Juvenile Justice Board with a review petition. Police then asked to try the minor as an adult in its review petition.

The same day, a second FIR was registered based on two sections of the Juvenile Justice Act, Sections 75 and 77. This FIR was against the minor’s father—retail builder Vishal Agrawal—and the owners and employees of the two bars that served the group of teenager's alcohol. In its FIR, the Pune Police contended that Vishal Agrawal not only endangered his son's life by giving him the car to drive despite knowing well that his child did not have a driving license but also held responsible for allowing his son to party, knowing well that he drinks alcohol. The Pune Police later on the same day, traced, chased, and arrested the absconding Vishal Agrawal from Chhatrapati Sambhajinagar. Angry protesters later attempted to throw ink at him when he was being taken to a local court.

Pune district collector Suhas Diwase ordered the two pubs to be sealed after the state excise department submitted a report highlighting multiple lacunae in their functioning. In a crackdown on illegal activities by pubs, two other pubs which had been constructed illegally were demolished.

On 22 May, the juvenile court cancelled the bail which had been granted and order the accused to be remanded till 5 June 2024 and was lodged at the Nehru Udyog Kendra Observation Home.

On 24 May, against the growing protest for justice, Police Commissioner of Pune Amitsh Kumar announced that they were making a watertight case, and that the allegation of preferential treatment was also being investigated by an ACP Rank officer. The Commissioner also stated that the minor was in his full senses and further charges of Indian Penal Code will be pressed against him. A case was registered against the minor boy under the Indian Penal Code Sections - 304A (causing death by negligence), 304 (culpable homicide), 337 (negligent driving endangering safety of others), 338 (rash or negligent act that endangers personal safety) and 427 (mischief causing loss or damage punishable with imprisonment, which may extend to two years or with fine, or both), and other sections of the Motor Vehicles Act.

On the same day, two police officers were suspended for a breach of protocol with regards to the case.

The accused claimed that the driver employed by the family was driving the car when the accident took place. On 25 May, the grandfather of the accused was arrested for wrongful confinement of the driver, in order to coerce him to take the blame for the accident. The police also alleged that the father of the accused tampered with evidence.

On 27 May, two senior doctors from the Sassoon Hospital were arrested for replacing blood samples taken from the accused.

On 25 June, after a plea from the maternal aunt of the accused, the Bombay High Court directed the police to release the accused, declaring the previous remand order illegal and for the accused to be under the care and custody of the aunt.

On 26 July, the Pune Police filed a 900 page chargesheet against 7 accused for allegedly manipulating evidence to protect the minor who was accused in the accident.

Later, the state women and child development (WCD) department conducted a probe into alleged irregularities after huge uproar over bail granted to the juvenile under lenient conditions. The department has terminated the service of two members for “procedural lapses, misconduct and non-compliance with norms".

A labour contractor who was also the father of the two minors accompanying Vedant Agrawal was also arrested on charges of conspiracy, manipulation of the blood alcohol test of his minor son and destruction of evidence after the car crashed into the bike of the two IT professionals.

Two more people named Aditya Avinash Sood and Ashish Satish Mittal were arrested for trying to save the boy's two minor friends. Sood and Mittal approached the Chief Medical Officer of Sassoon, Shrihari Halnor, and head of the forensic department. They bribed Ajay Taware. Sood then replaced a boy's blood sample with his own blood sample. The police investigation also revealed that Mittal had replaced the other boy's blood sample with his own blood sample at the behest of the accused Arun Kumar Singh.

On 20 May, Police Department had asked the court to try the minor as an adult in its review petition. On 15 July 2025, the Juvenile Justice Board (JJB) dismissed the Pune police’s request to prosecute the minor involved in the fatal Porsche accident as an adult. Later, the Pune Police have filed an appeal before the sessions court against the JJB’s July 15 order.

== Reactions ==
The decision of the court to award the accused bail, with its order to write a 300-word essay, triggered outrage across the country and led to a debate on road safety in India.

Deputy Chief Minister Devendra Fadnavis issued statements of condemnation expressing shock and surprise over the leniency of the Juvenile Justice Board.

Leaders such as Sanjay Raut from the Shiv Sena (UBT) and Supriya Sule from the Nationalist Congress Party – Sharadchandra Pawar also raised questions over whether the Pune Police’s alleged leniency with the teenager was the result of political pressure.

Kasba MLA Ravindra Dhangekar alleged that the Pune Police Commissioner "doesn't think anyone is guilty because he is living on builders' money".

Congress Party leader Rahul Gandhi also raised the issue targeting Prime Minister Narendra Modi and the BJP dispensation, stating:

If someone is killed by a bus driver, truck driver, Ola, Uber, or auto-driver by mistake, they get a prison term of 10 years, and their keys are thrown away. But if a rich kid drives a Porsche under the influence of alcohol and kills two persons, he is asked to write an essay. Why aren’t truck drivers, bus drivers, or Uber, auto drivers asked to write essays? The question is about justice. It should be the same for everyone, for the rich and the poor.

On 26 May 2024, the Congress Youth Wing of Pune organised an essay writing competition on the spot of the car crash as a mark of protest.

== See also ==
- Li Gang incident
- Death of Wichian Klanprasert
