= Yerawada =

- Neighbourhood
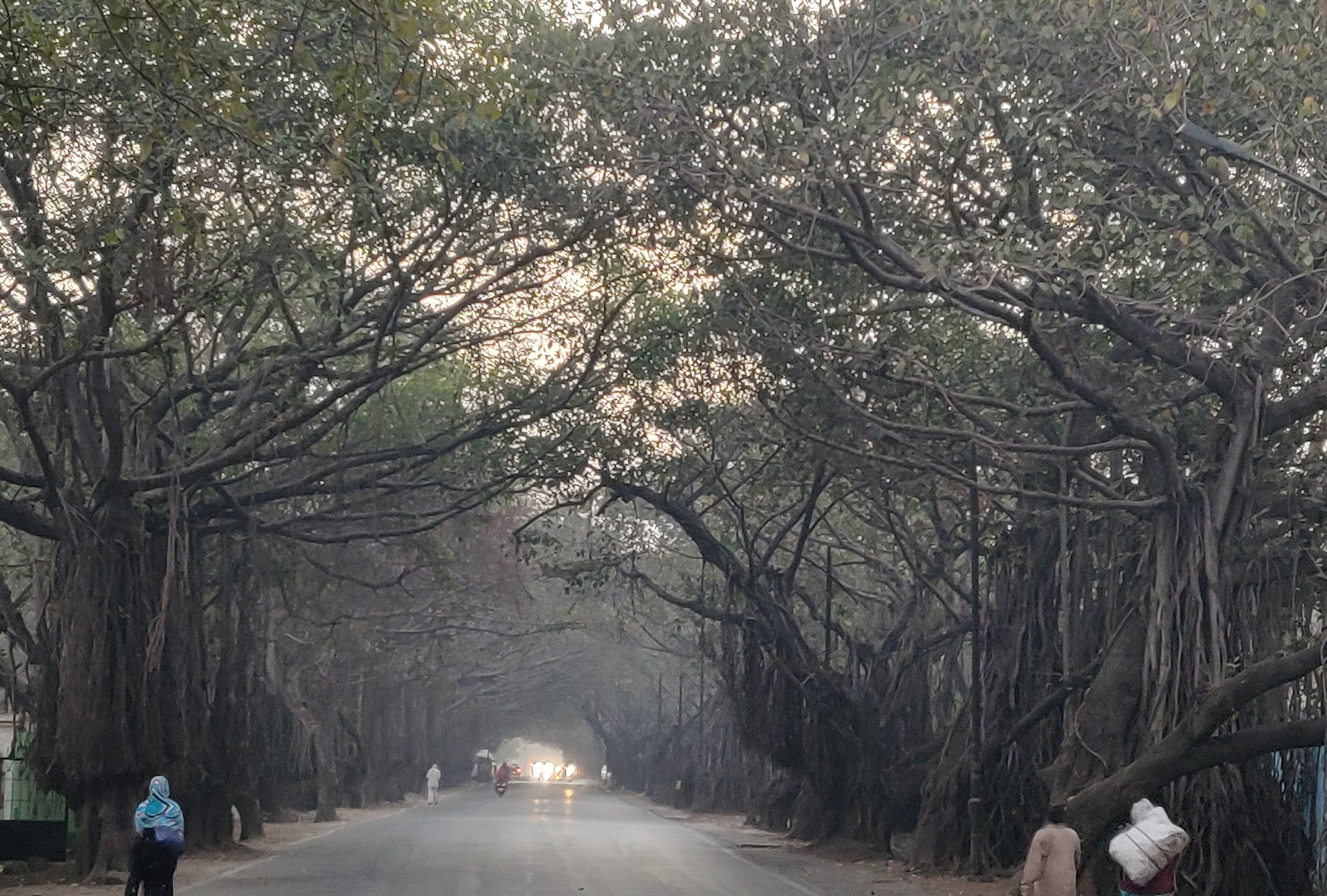
- Yerawada Central Jail Road

- Location in Maharashtra, India
- Coordinates: 18.556845°N 73.88649°E
- Country: India
- State: Maharashtra
- District: Pune

Government
  - Body: Pune Municipal Corporation

Area
  - Total: 79.62 km^{2} (30.74 sq mi)
- Elevation: 530 m (1,740 ft)

Population (2001)
  - Total: 337,040
  - Density: 4,233/km^{2} (10,960/sq mi)

Languages
  - Official: Marathi
- Time zone: UTC+5:30 (IST)
- PIN: 411006
- Telephone code: +91-20
- Vehicle registration: MH-12
- Lok Sabha constituency: Pune
- Vidhan Sabha constituency: Vadgaon Sheri
- Distance from Mumbai: 152 kilometres (94 mi) (land)

Yerawada is a neighbourhood of the city of Pune in the state of Maharashtra, India. Before that British Raj Yerawada was known as Yeraoda. Yerawada is one of the most densely populated areas in Pune. It is located at the beginning of Ahmednagar highway and also on the way to old Pune Airport at Lohagaon. This place can be reached after crossing Mula-Mutha River through Yerawada Bridge (Fitzgerald Bridge or Bund Garden Bridge) from Bund Garden.

== Demographics ==
As of 2001 India census Yerawada has an approximate population of 337,040.

== Geography ==
Yerawada shares borders with:

- Mula-Mutha River
- Bund Garden
- Khadki
- Vimannagar
- Wadgaon Sheri
- Lohegaon
- Koregaon Park
- Vishrantwadi

== History ==
The central prison of Pune—which is one of the oldest prisons in India, having been built in the nineteenth century—is situated in Yerawada. Kasturba Gandhi Smiriti Mandir, which stands in a garden that spreads over 6.5 hectares of land, is situated across the river in Yerawada. Govind Vinayak Ranade, was hanged on 10 May 1899 in Yerawada Jail.

The ashes of Kasturba Gandhi, wife of Mahatma Gandhi, are kept in this memorial. The mental asylum of Pune is also located at Yerawada.[4]

=== Yerawada Jail ===
This is the largest jail in the State of Maharashtra. The most notable person to be incarcerated at the jail is Mahatma Gandhi, who spent several years there during India's struggle for freedom.

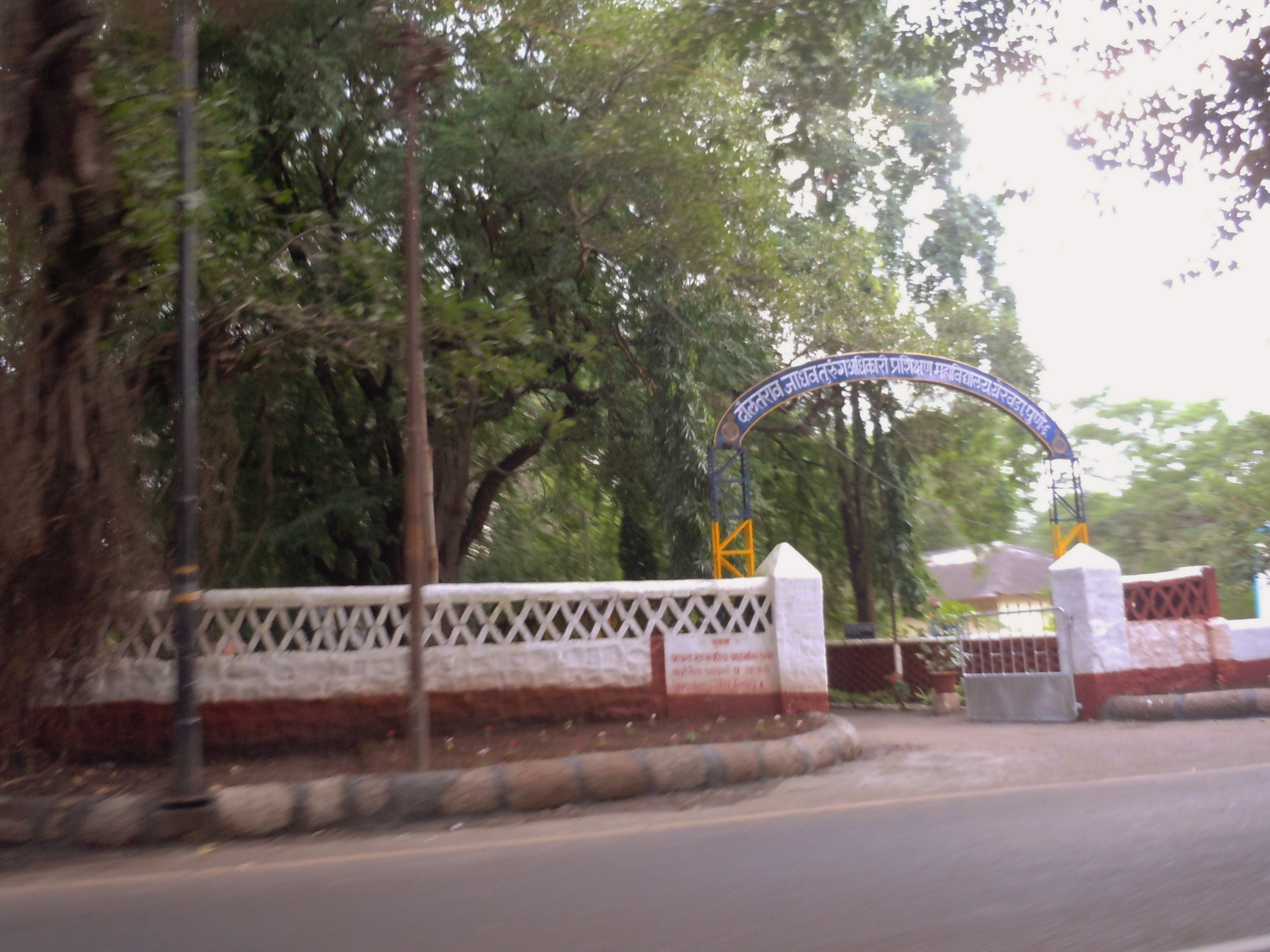
Yerwada Central Jail entrance.

A programme designed to spread Gandhian principles in Yerwada prison was introduced in Yerawada prison in 2002 by Asim Sarode, founder of Sahyog Trust. As part of the programme, the prison inmates are taught Gandhian principles for one year, at the end of the year, they have to appear for an examination. Admission to the course is optional. Four years after the initiation of the course, Sahyog Trust conducted a survey amongst the prison inmates to check the degree of awareness of Gandhian principles. The results of the survey were encouraging as 94 per cent expressed respect for Gandhi. A majority 77 per cent of them believed that social change can be brought about by love and friendship. Also, 66 per cent of them showed the willingness to apologise to the victim's family and seek forgiveness from them.

Taking the Gandhian principles and ideas to the prisoners has led to a marked improvement in the levels of discipline at the prison. According to the Deputy Inspector General (DIG) of police of the western region, Rajendra Dhamne, "the course has definitely contributed to the maintenance of peace inside the prison. The number of violent incidents amongst the inmates has comparatively reduced."

The result of the survey has given a boost to the aforementioned Trust's initiatives. It has also proved that even those judged as criminals have a human side to them and in many cases they only take to crime due to compelling circumstances (poverty, political disenfranchisement). The course adopts a reformist approach to tackling crime in the society.

Bollywood film actor Sanjay Dutt and Mumbai terror attacker Ajmal Kasab were also jailed there.

=== Agha Khan Palace ===
Agha Khan Palace, where Mahatma Gandhi visited and stayed several times during India's Independence struggle, is located on Ahmednagar highway in Yerawada. This is a historical monument which is visited by hundreds of people daily.

Sir Sultan Mohammed Shah, Aga Khan III, ordered the construction of the palace in 1892 to provide employment to the people of the nearby areas, who had been famished. Prince Karim El Husseni, Aga Khan IV, donated the palace to India in 1969, in the honor of Gandhiji. Aga Khan Palace is also known as Gandhi National Memorial because of its close association with Mahatma Gandhi.

One of the major attractions of the Aga Khan Palace is the samadhis (memorials) of Kasturba Gandhi (wife of Mahatma Gandhi) and Mahadev Desai (a long-time aid of Mahatma Gandhi). Since both of them breathed their last in there, Charles Correa got their samadhis built in the grounds of the palace itself. Gandhi's ashes are also interred at the Gandhi National Memorial of Pune. Exhibitions are held at the palace on a regular basis to acquaint people with the life and career of Mahatma Gandhi.

The palace served as the venue for the movie Gandhi. Since 1980, the management of the museum, samadhis and campus of the Agakhan Palace is under the Gandhi Memorial Society. The museum inside the palace complex has a collection of pictures depicting almost all the important incidents in the life of Mahatma Gandhi. There is also a wide assortment of his personal items like utensils, clothes, malas, chappals (slippers), letter written by Gandhiji on the death of his secretary, etc.

== Sukha and Jinda ==
Harjinder Singh Jinda and Sukdev Singh Sukha were imprisoned in this prison in 1992 for assassinating Indian Chief of Army Staff (COAS) Gen. A.S. Vaidya. Gen A.S. Vaidya was COAS when Operation Bluestar was executed at the Golden Temple in June 1984. Both of them were hanged to death.

== Administration ==
Yerawada is part of Pune Municipal Corporation. All major and important administrative offices of state and central government are located there. This include Sales Tax Office, Income Tax Office, and Telecom Office.

Ajmal Kasab, the accused of Mumbai Terror 26/11 was hanged for death in same premises on 21 November 2012.

== Education ==
- Deccan College Post Graduate Research Institute(Deemed University)

== See also ==
- Kharadi
- Vishrantwadi
