= Vishrantwadi =

Suburb in Pune, Maharashtra, India

Vishrantwadi Vishrantwadi (विश्रांतवाडी)
- Suburban
- Nickname: Wadi
- Location in Maharashtra, India
- Coordinates: 18.5726296°N 73.8782501°E
- Country: India
- State: Maharashtra
- District: Pune

Government
  - Body: Pune Municipal Corporation

Languages
  - Official: Marathi
- Time zone: UTC+5:30 (IST)
- PIN: 411015
- Telephone code: 020-
- Vehicle registration: MH-12
- Lok Sabha constituency: Pune
- Vidhan Sabha constituency: Vadgaon Sheri
- Civic agency: Pune Municipal Corporation
- Distance from City centre: 9.7 kilometres (6.0 mi) (PMPML City buses)

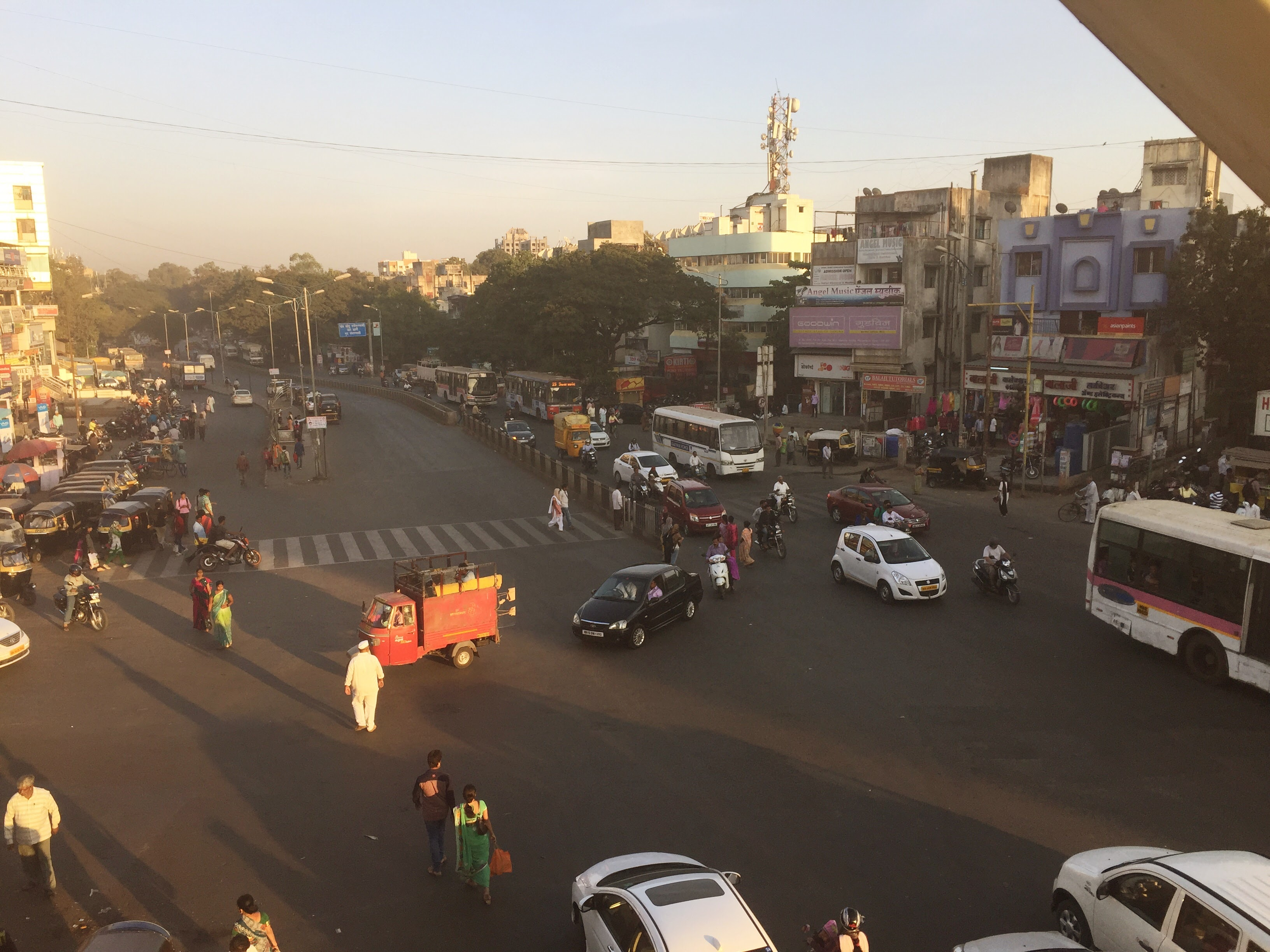

Vishrantwadi is a suburb of Pune City in the State of Maharashtra, India. Vishrantwadi is a bustling commercial and residential neighborhood to the north of the city including areas of Mohanwadi, Pratik Nagar, Kasturbawadi (Kasturba Housing Society), Phule Nagar, Mental Corner, Police Lines, Shanti Nagar, Dhanori, Tingre Nagar, Kalas, Mhaskewasti and Dighi.

== Location ==
Vishrantwadi is located near and shares borders with

- Yerwada
- Lohegaon
- Khadki
- Alandi
- Dhanori

The entire neighbourhood of Vishrantwadi lies along the Alandi Road. Other major roads in this locality are the Tingre Nagar Road (Vishrantwadi-Airport Road) and Dhanori Road. The Pune Railway station is about 7 kilometers from Vishrantwadi while the Pune International Airport at Lohegaon is just about 4 kilometers away. The Maha Metro approved a flyover at Vishrantwadi Chowk connecting Airport Road with Alandi Road in August 2024. The Yerwada Central Jail and the Pune Mental Hospital too are situated nearby. There was a proposal to shif the CBI office to Vishrantwada.

== Etymology and history ==
Vishrantwadi used to be a resting place for the thousands of Varkaris who made the annual pilgrimage from Alandi to Pandharpur in South Maharashtra by foot. Vishrant in Marathi means "rest", "wadi" means "hamlet" or "town", and thus the name 'Vishrantwadi'. Even today the annual Jñāneśvar pilgrimage procession passes through Vishrantwadi.

== Connectivity ==
Vishrantwadi is well connected to the rest of Pune by various modes of public transportation. PMPML operates a number of routes to the rest of Pune and other suburbs. The PMPML also operates a BRTS on Alandi Road.

== Population ==
In the past, Vishrantwadi was largely populated by Marathi speaking middle-class Maharashtrian families. With Pune becoming more cosmopolitan, a large number of Tamil, Malayalam, Punjabi, Gujarati, Marwadi, Urdu and Telugu speaking families have settled down here as well. It is a favoured residential choice for people working in the IT sector whose offices are in and around Kalyani Nagar, Yerwada, Vimannagar. Proximity to the city centre, low pollution, good infrastructure and connectivity has led to a substantial increase in population.

There are a number of army and air force establishments nearby, amongst which are the Research & Development Establishment (Engineers), Bombay Engineering Group, Khadki military cantonment, GREF Centre and Lohegaon Air Force station. Vishrantwadi is the location of the residential complex of Pune City Police at Police Lines. Army Institute of Technology, a college established by Indian Army is also near Vishrantwadi on Alandi Road near Dighi.

There is a lake within an abandoned quarry about 200 meters away from Vishrantwadi chowk. Many shopping complexes fulfill the daily needs of the residents living in and around Vishrantwadi. Similarly, there has been a gradual increase in educational institutes (tutors) in Vishrantwadi.
