= Vadgaon Sheri =

- Neighborhood
- Nickname: Vadgaon
- Location in Maharashtra, India
- Coordinates: 18.5533°N 73.9231°E
- Country: India
- State: Maharashtra
- District: Pune

Government
  - Body: Pune Municipal Corporation

Languages
  - Official: Marathi, English
- Time zone: UTC+5:30 (IST)
- PIN: 411014
- Telephone code: 020-
- Vehicle registration: MH-12
- Lok Sabha constituency: Pune
- Vidhan Sabha constituency: Wadgaon Sheri
- Civic agency: Pune Municipal Corporation

Wadgaonsheri (Wadgaon Sheri) also spelled as "Vadgaonsheri" (PMC office located in Nagar Road) is an upmarket residential and commercial neighborhood of Pune, India located off the Nagar Road and centrally located all within 5 to 10 minutes drive to Viman Nagar Airport, Kalyani Nagar, Koregaon Park, Kharadi to name a few. Earlier a village outside the city, It is now one of the luxury upmarket areas of Pune, with real estate prices being quite high and increasing. It is an upscale luxury residential location due to easy accessibility to work and leisure as well as good educational institutions, making it a coveted and highly sought after residential destination. A significant central section of Wadgaonsheri, Digambar Nagar, has been renamed New Kalyani Nagar given the massive new upscale constructions from several prominent real estate organizations in the city and also its strategic location in close proximity to posh area of Kalyani Nagar. The entire locality is bounded by Nagar Road towards north and Mula Mutha River towards south. Also, the upscale area of Koregaon Park and IT hub of Kharadi are easily accessible, nearly 5 km, from Wadgaonsheri. Several apartment complexes, completed as well as developing, are spread across the locality. Wadgaonsheri (Ramwadi) is also home to many NGOs and Educational Societies like Christ College and De Nobili College, "The largest Jesuit scholasticate in the world."

== Location ==
Wadgaonsheri is located at and shares borders with

- Koregaon Park
- Kalyani Nagar
- Mula-Mutha River
- Viman nagar
- Chandan nagar
- Kharadi

The entire neighborhood of Wadgaonsheri lies along the Nagar Road. Other major roads in this locality are the Somnath Nagar Road, Anand Park Road, Wadgaonsheri Main Road and Kalyani Nagar Road. The Pune Junction is about 6.5 kilometers from Wadgaonsheri while the Pune International Airport at Lohgaon is just about 5 kilometers away. City centers like Shivajinagar, Deccan Gymkhana, Mahatma Gandhi Road, Camp, Hadapsar are all within a radius of nine to ten kilometers. The Yerwada Central Jail and the Pune Mental Hospital too are situated five kilometers.

== Transport ==
Wadgaonsheri is serviced by the PMPML & Metro (Kalyani Nagar). Buses connect it to other parts of Pune like Manpa (Bus no.165) and Kumbre Park. Anand Park Being connected to Manpa by bus no. 133; Sainathnagar to Manpa by bus no. 133 and to Kumbre Park; Shubham Society connected to Manpa by bus no. 132. New Bus service include Wadgaonsheri via Anand Park to Manpa (bus no. 133A) and Wadgaonsheri via Shubham Society to Manpa (bus no. 132A).

More recently Pune Metro Rail line has been planned to pass through Wadgaonsheri - Ramwadi area.

=== Other modes ===
Other modes of transport are auto rickshaw, six-seaters, private buses and vehicles.

== Population ==
The total population is estimated to be around 5 lakhs +.

== Economy ==
Wadgaonsheri is home to many information technology companies like Barclays, Amazon, FiServ, Mindcrest India Private Limited, Mlogica Computech India Private Limited, E Space IT Park, Azhar Pathan IT Agency. Warehouses such as Myntra, Dhelivery, Amazon, Flipkart are also very prominent.

== Education ==
Schools and colleges include:

- St. Arnold's Central School
- Bishop's Co-Ed School
- Acharya Anand Rushiji Maharaj Primary School
- Lonkar Madhyamik Vidyalay & College
- Stella Maris English School
- Fr. Agnel's Vidyankur School
- Shivraj Vidya Mandir
- Mother Teresa School & Junior College
- L.T. Inamdar Marathi School
- L.T. Inamdar Urdu School
- L.T. Inamdar English School
- Anjali English School
- Indian Education Soc. School
- St. Francis de Sales High School
- Sundarbai Marathe Vidyalaya
- Christ College
- De Nobili College
- Symbiosis College and Symbiosis Law School and Management School
- EUROKIDS International Preschool

== Health ==
Some of the hospitals include:

- Kurkute Hospital
- Sahyadri Hospital, Shastri Nagar
- Niramay Hospital
- Anup Hospital
- Damodar Ravji Galande Clinic Shastri Nagar (Run by the PMC)
- Kilbil Hospital
- Chintamani Hospital
- Vinayak Hospital
- Columbia Asia Hospital (Kharadi Mundhawa road)
- Family Care Clinic, Somnathnagar
- Maa Saheb Thackrey Clinic (Run by PMC)

== See also ==
- Pune
- Pune Airport
