= Gauri Kumari =

Indian Dalit activist and lawyer from Bihar

- Born: Munger, Bihar
- Education: Bhagalpur University
- Occupations: Lawyer, Dalit activist
- Known for: Activism for Dalit women's rights

Gauri Kumari is an Indian Dalit activist and lawyer from Munger, Bihar.

She practices at the Munger Civil Court in Bihar. She has been working with All India Dalit Mahila Adhikar Manch since 2008 and is also associated with National Campaign on Dalit Human Rights. Her work towards spreading legal awareness and rights for Dalit women and girls has been recognised by award from the National Foundation for India in 2024-25.

== Biography ==
Kumari was born in Munger district, Bihar, one of the most backward districts in India. Her father worked as a sweeper. One of the five children in the family, she contracted polio at the age of four, which affects her ability to walk. After her parents died when she was young, she took on the responsibility of caring for her younger siblings. She has spoken about facing multiple layers of discrimination due to her caste, gender, and disability.

She completed her education with help of a government scholarship and obtained double graduate degree in law from Bhagalpur University. She also contested in the local district election and held the position of Member of Ward (council) in Munger for five year.

As of 2019, Kumari had been practicing as an advocate in the Munger civil court for 19 years where she has also served as a Special Public Prosecutor. She was the first Dalit woman to become a member of the Juvenile Justice Board, and the first female vice-president of the Munger Bar Council.

== See also ==
- Dalit feminism
- Women's rights in India
