= Undri =

Undri may refer to:

- Undrið FF, a Faroese football team
- Urdu, an alternate name for Undri
- Undri, a neighborhood in Pune, Maharashtra, India
