= Li Gang incident =

2010 scandal in China

Coordinates: 38°52′44″N 115°33′36″E

On 16 October 2010, two women were struck in a hit and run during a drunk driving incident at Hebei University in Baoding, Hebei, China. One of them, 20-year-old Chen Xiaofeng (陈晓凤), a student from Xinji, Shijiazhuang at the Electronic Information Engineering College died on 17 October in the hospital. The other victim, Zhang Jingjing (张晶晶), aged 19, remained in a stable condition, albeit suffering from a fractured left leg. The driver, 22-year-old Li Qiming (李启铭), was arrested by campus security after fleeing the scene and dropping off his girlfriend at the female dormitory.

Footage of the arrest, in which Li shouted,"Go ahead, sue me if you dare. My dad is Li Gang!" (有本事你们告去，我爸是李刚; Yǒu běnshi nǐmen gào qù, wǒ bà shì Lǐ Gāng), was spread on Chinese social media and caused outrage over potential corruption within law enforcement. A so-called human flesh search revealed that Li Gang was the deputy director of the Beishi district office of Baoding public security bureau. The case subsequently became known as the "My dad is Li Gang" incident ("我爸是李刚"案), with the phrase having since become a popular catchphrase and internet meme within China, frequently seen on various forums and message boards, used ironically in conversation by speakers trying to avoid responsibility. In official accounts and news reports, the case is referred to as the Hebei University "10·16" campus traffic accident case (Chinese: 河北大学“10·16”校园车祸案).

In January 2011, Li Qiming was sentenced to six years in jail and ordered to pay the equivalent of $69,900 in compensation to the family of Chen Xiaofeng. Li was also ordered to pay $13,800 to the injured woman.

== Timeline ==
- 16 October 2010, around 21:40: Hebei Institute of Media student Li Qiming drove drunk in his friend's Volkswagen Magotan and hit two female students, Chen Xiaofeng and Zhang Jingjing, after picking up his girlfriend. After the crash Li shouted "My father is Li Gang!", referring to his father's status and influence as the deputy director of Baoding public security bureau, Hebei province.
- 17 October, in the evening: Chen Xiaofeng dies in the hospital. The other student, Zhang Jingjing, received only a minor injury and was kept in the hospital.
- 18 October: Rumors begin to spread that the Hebei Institute of Media was telling students who witnessed the crash to stop discussing the crash and discouraged further discussion of the topic in general.
- 22 October: Li Qiming and his father Li Gang broadcast a tearful apology on CCTV (China Central Television) to the victims.
- 26 October: The governor of the Hebei province announced that the drunk-driving crash will be processed as a serious legal offence.
- 5 November: Chen's family and Li's family settled out of court for a compensation of 460,000 yuan.
- 7 November: Chen Xiaofeng was buried in Xinji following a ghost marriage ceremony.
- 14 December: Chen's lawyer, Zhang Kai, was beaten in the street. He posted on his blog that he thought that there might be some connection between the government and the gangster that was involved.
- 21 December: The Baoding public security bureau announced that this crash counted as a criminal case, which made it impossible to settle out of court. Suspect Li Qiming was still jailed.
- 26 January 2011: Wangdu County People's Court opened its court session of the crash. The court had been chosen since it was outside of Baoding, where Li Gang held his public security bureau position. Li Qiming was charged with committing the crime of causing traffic casualties. Li entered a guilty plea and issued a confession. Chen's family was there in the audience.
- 30 January: The court sentenced Li Qiming to jail for 6 years and ordered him to pay restitution to the victims and their families, numbering ¥460,000 for the Chen family and ¥91,000 for the Zhang family. Li's confession and his father's apology were considered mitigating.

== Online discussion and censorship ==
Four days after the incident, an online poetry contest invited entrants to incorporate the sentence "My father is Li Gang" (我爸是李刚; Wǒ bà shì Lǐ Gāng) into classical Chinese poems. The contest was created by a female blogger in northern China nicknamed Piggy Feet Beta on MOP, a popular Chinese bulletin board system. It received more than 6,000 submissions.

Communist Party officials tried at first to suppress reports of the incident, but their efforts backfired. During an interview with China Central Television on 21 October, Li Gang wept in an apology; then on 22 October, a video showing Li Qiming's apology was released. The apology was rejected by the victims' families, including Chen's elder brother who believed the apology to be a political stunt. The People's Daily, in an editorial published on October 26, urged authorities to take the affair into their own hands and shed light on the matter.

On 29 October, the South China Morning Post and other sources revealed that a directive from the Central Propaganda Department, issued on 28 October, required that there be "no more hype regarding the disturbance over traffic at Hebei University," and ordered Chinese newspapers to recall their reporters from Baoding.

On 1 November, Zhang Kai, the attorney for the relatives of Chen Xiaofeng, was abruptly asked to terminate his representation in the case, after the law firm was cautioned by the Beijing Bureau of Justice, according to a blog by Wang Keqin, an influential muckraking reporter, blogger and professor at Peking University. That same day, Director Liu of Baoding Traffic Police Division and some clerks from Wangdu County proposed payments to the relatives of Chen Xiaofeng to settle the case.

On 4 November, the Central Propaganda Department banned news of an interview by Phoenix Television with Chen Xiaofeng's brother, Chen Lin, in which he was critical of the government.

On 9 November, Internet discussion of the case had ceased due to regulations. Local students and activists such as Ai Weiwei have continued to speak out.

In December 2010, before the trial, journalists Wang Keqin and Feng Jun claimed in their blog that the Chen family had been pressured to accept the agreed court settlement following threats of job termination. According to Wang and Feng, the Chen family were told that government officials wanted to resolve the case without further escalations after it became political in nature and that the amount was predetermined by Li's father, who never showed up in person to any meetings.

In spring 2013, rumors were spread online that Li Qiming had been released from prison. The Hebei Provincial Prison Administration denied this and stated that Li remained imprisoned for his full sentence.

== See also ==
=== In China ===
- Hefei student protests
- Chinese Internet slang

- Grass Mud Horse
- Great Firewall
- Internet Water Army

- Censorship in China
  - Internet censorship in China
- Corruption in China
- Law enforcement in China
- List of Internet phenomena in China

=== Outside of China ===
- 2024 Pune Porsche car crash
