= Seva Cafe =

Restaurant in Ahmedabad, Gujarat, India

Seva Cafe is an Ahmedabad cafe that works on the concept of pay it forward. Sevā is a Sanskrit word that means selfless service. The cafe functions on the concept of gift-economy and peer-to-peer generosity. The customer bill shows an amount of zero with a footnote which states: "Your meal was a gift from someone who came before you. To keep the chain of gifts alive, we invite you to pay it forward for those who dine after you."

== History ==
The first Seva Cafe was established in 2006 by Manav Sadhna, an NGO founded by John Silliphant and Jayesh Patel.

In addition to its primary location in Ahmedabad, the Seva Cafe operates in temporary locations across the world. The first of these temporary projects was started in Bengaluru, Karnataka in December 2012, which ran for two days with the help of 15 volunteers. The third branch was established in Mumbai on Sunday 13 January 2013 near Shantivan Gardens. The fourth branch was in Pune. It opened on 2 October 2015 near the Green Vegan cafe, Phoenix Marketcity. Some of these outlets do not run on a regular basis, but host free lunch/dinners monthly.

Seva Café inspired Karma Kitchen in Berkeley, California, Washington D.C., Chicago and Long Island, California.

== Operations ==
The cafe is staffed by volunteers who cook and serve patrons. At the end of the meal, guests are given a slip of paper. They are then informed that their meal was paid for by a previous patron, and they in turn should make a contribution for a future guest. The accounting is completely transparent and is displayed on a noticeboard inside the cafe. All profits are pulled back into running the project. The cafe is open four days a week; approximately 50 guests are served each day.
