= Vimannagar =

Viman Nagar Dunkirk Lines
- Eastern Suburb of Pune
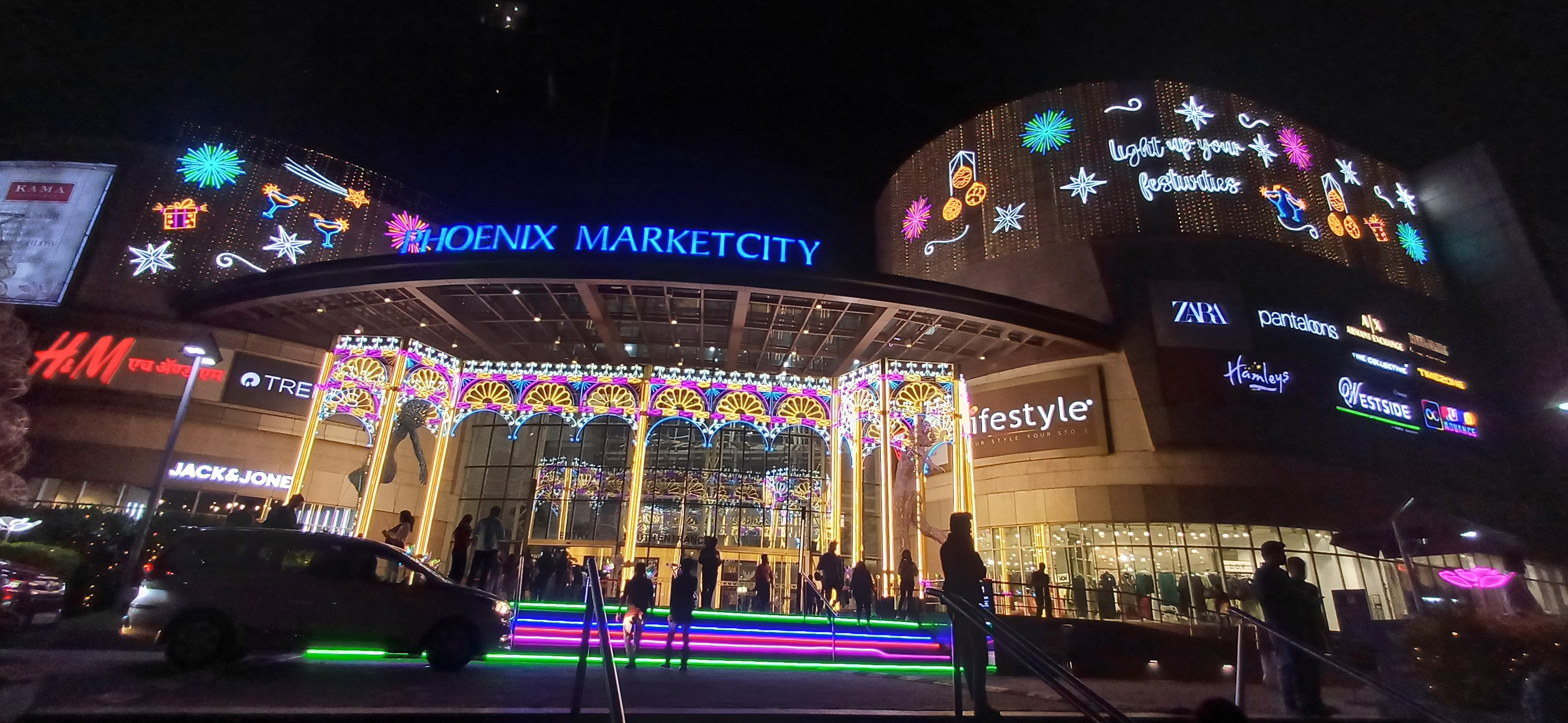
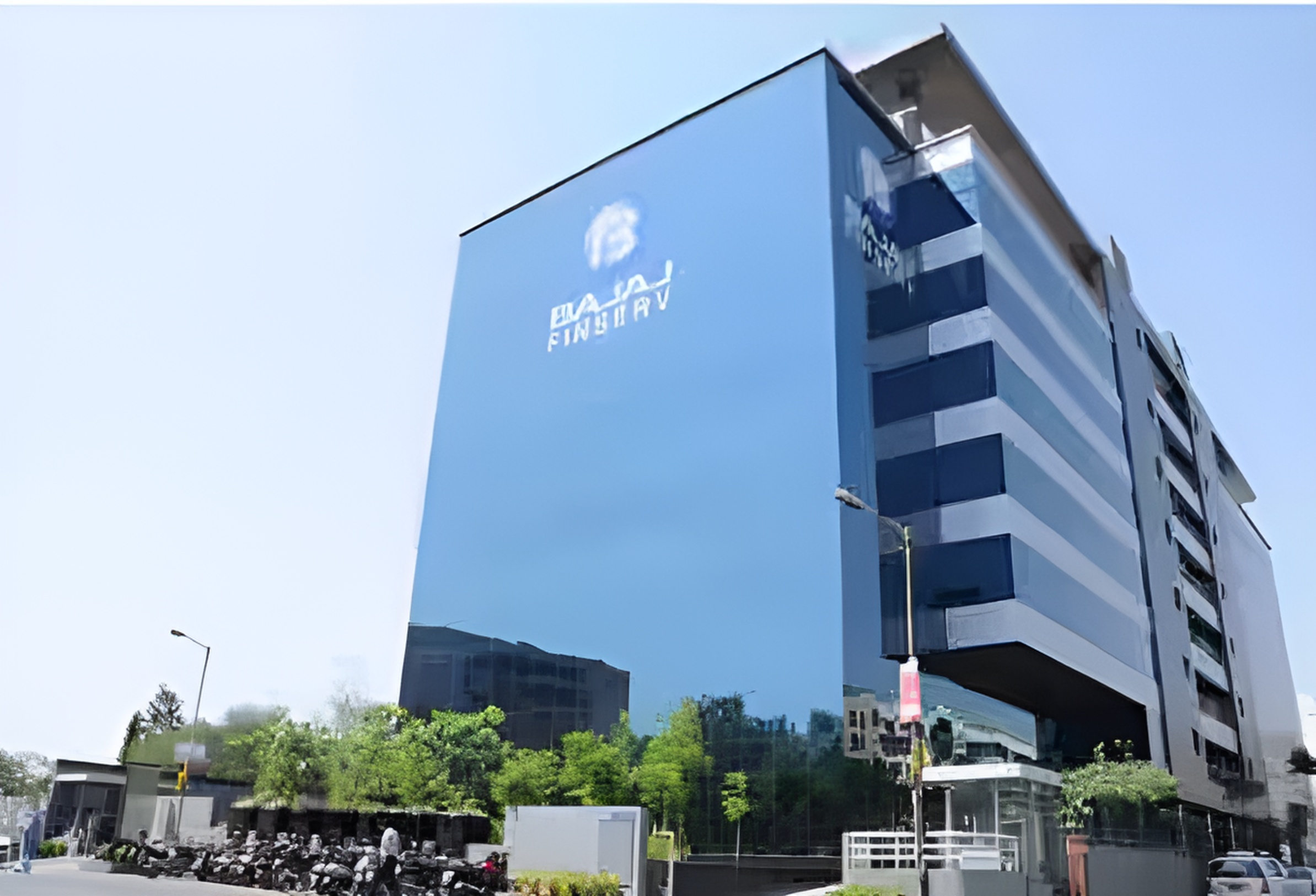
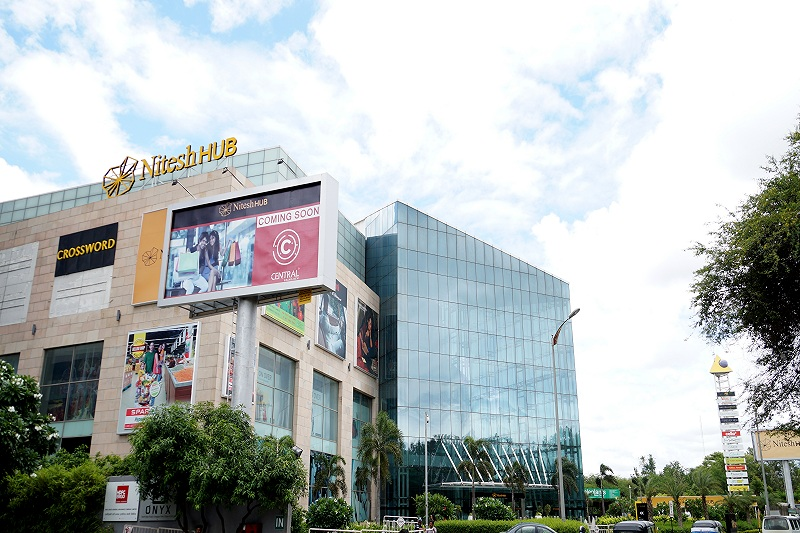
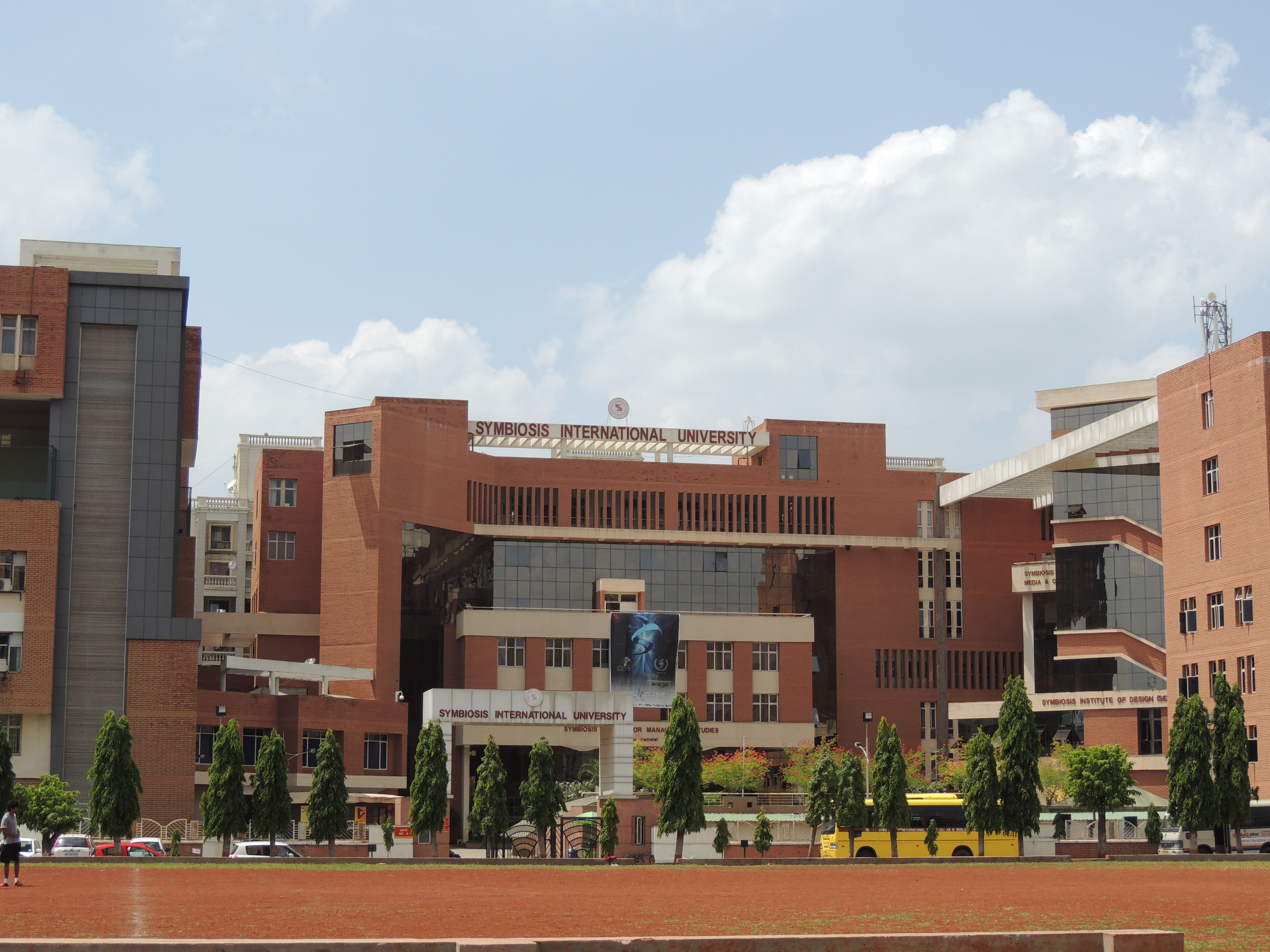
- Clockwise from top: Phoenix Marketcity (Pune); Nitesh Hub; Symbiosis International School; Bajaj Finserv Headquarters
- Nickname: Airport City
- Location within Maharashtra Location within India
- Coordinates: 18.56°N 73.91°E
- Country: India
- State: Maharashtra
- District: Pune
- Metro: Pune
- Founder: Lohegaon
- Time zone: UTC+5:30 (IST)
- PIN: 411014
- Area code: 020
- Vehicle registration: MH 12
- Civic agency: Pune Municipal Corporation

Viman Nagar (Marathi: विमान नगर lit. Airport City) is a residential and retail neighborhood in the Eastern Metropolitan Corridor of Pune, regarded as one of the affluent regions in the city. Viman Nagar is in proximity to the Pune International Airport and constitutes the eastern necklace of the city along with Koregaon Park and Kalyani Nagar.

During the Pre-independence era, the neighborhood was known as Dunkirk Lines. It has residential complexes, corporate offices, fine-dining restaurants, and shopping malls. The locality provides easy accessibility to work and leisure for its residents and also contains educational institutions like Symbiosis Law School, Pune. For these reasons it has one of the highest property rates in real estate in Maharashtra.

== Location ==
Viman Nagar is located 7.5 kilometers North off the Pune Railway Station and 0.5 kilometers South off the Pune International Airport.

== Geography ==
- Northbound: Pune International Airport
- Westbound: Yerawada
- Central: Lohagaon
- Southbound: Vadgaon Sheri
- Eastbound: Kharadi, Hadapsar, Wagholi

== Demographics ==
Country	India
District	Pune
Municipal Corporation	Pune Municipal Corporation
Pin code	411014
MLA	Sunil Tingre (Nationalist Congress Party)
Ex.MLA	Bapu Pathare (Nationalist Congress Party)
MP	Girish Bapat (Bharatiya Janata Party)

== Roads ==
The Pune-Ahmednagar Highway (Maharashtra State Highway 27/MH-SH-27) passes through Viman Nagar.

== Hotels ==
Viman Nagar is home to the following International Chain of Hotels:

- Hyatt Regency
- Novotel
- Ibis
- Four Points by Sheraton
- Lemon Tree Hotels
- The Hotel Hindusthan International

== Educational Institutions ==
- Symbiosis Institute of Design
- Symbiosis School of Liberal Arts
- Symbiosis Law School
- Symbiosis Institute of Business Management
- Symbiosis School of Media & Communication

== Nearby landmarks ==
- Pune International Airport
- Viman Nagar Joggers' Park, Pune
- Aga Khan Palace
- Fly India Paramotor Club (Paragliding)
- Phoenix Market City
- Udaan Bio-Diversity Park by Zensar has collaborated with the Pune Municipal Corporation for transforming a 2 acre plot into a Bio-Diversity Park at Vimannagar on lease Basis.
  - The park attracts more than 300 visitors a day comprising leisure walkers, picnickers, and students.
- Viman Nagar Rollerskating Rink
  - Named after a notable starting shooting guard of the SIS inter-school team, the "Shivansh Dutt Basketball Court" is positioned north-east of the campus. Shivansh went on to pursue his passion of playing Basketball in the city of Edmonton, Canada after graduating.
  - The "Ansh Kapadia Football Ground", named in honor of a Symbiosis International School alumnus football player, is located east of the campus. Ansh subsequently went on to play in Toronto, Canada.

== See also ==
- BRTS
- Pune Metro
- Phoenix Marketcity
