= List of neighbourhoods in Pune =

The Pune, Maharashtra, India, metropolitan area consists of:

== Old city ==
This area consists of areas which were part of Pune before the arrival of the British in 1818. This area consists of 17 peths. This area is today called as Old city.

== Central ==
These are the areas which comes under Central Pune City

- Peth Areas
- Shivaji Nagar
- Deccan Gymkhana
- Model Colony
- Shaniwar Wada
- Swargate
- Tilak Road
- Bhandarkar Road
- Ganeshkhind Road
- Gokhale Nagar
- Senapati Bapat Road
- Prabhat Road
- Camp
- Pulgate
- Shankar Sheth Road
- Bajirao Road
- Fergusson College Road
- Jangli Maharaj Road
- Laxmi Road
- Sangamwadi
- Khadki
- Range Hills
- Bhosale Nagar
- Pune University
- Bund Garden
- Pune Railway Station
- Tadiwala Road

== North Pune ==
- Vishrantwadi
- Dhanori
- Lohegaon
- Alandi
- Dighi
- Bopkhel
- Charholi
- Bhosari
- Moshi
- Chakan
- Kurali
- Rajgurunagar
- Manchar
- Yerwada
- Tingre Nagar
- 509 Area
- Viman Nagar

== East Pune ==
- Kharadi
- Vadgaon Sheri
- Hadapsar
- Mundhwa
- Koregaon Park
- Kalyani Nagar
- Wanwadi
- Magarpatta
- Shewalewadi
- Manjari
- Bhekrainagar
- Phursungi
- Lulla Nagar
- Wagholi
- Chandan Nagar
- Nagar Road
- Shikrapur
- Lonikand
- Uruli Kanchan
- Loni Kalbhor
- Talegaon Dhamdhere
- Shirur
- Yavat

== South Pune ==
- Balaji Nagar
- Katraj
- Sinhagad Road
- Vadgaon Budruk
- Dhayari
- Narhe Gaon
- Ambegaon
- Dhankawadi
- Bibwewadi
- Jambhulwadi
- Khed Shivapur
- Kapurhol
- Upper Indira Nagar
- Kondhwa
- Khadakwasla
- Yewalewadi
- Saswad
- Jejuri
- Satara Road
- Marketyard

== West Pune ==
- Kothrud
- Erandwane
- Paud Road
- Karve Road
- Karve Nagar
- Warje
- Uttam Nagar
- Bavdhan
- Bhugaon
- Pirangut
- Pashan
- Baner
- Aundh
- Sus
- Mahalunge
- Balewadi

== Northwest Pune (PCMC) ==
- Wakad
- Hinjewadi
- Thergaon
- Rahatani
- Pimple Nilakh
- Pimple Gurav
- Pimple Saudagar
- Sangvi
- Dapodi
- Kasarwadi
- Pimpri
- Nehru Nagar
- Chinchwad
- Vallabh Nagar
- Kalewadi
- Tathawade
- Punawale
- Kiwale
- Ravet
- Akurdi
- Walhekarwadi
- Nigdi
- Dehu Road
- Chikhali
- Talawade
- Dehu
- Talegaon Dabhade
- Vadgaon
- Lonavala
- Gahunje
- Kudalwadi

== See also ==
- List of roads in Pune
