= The Bishop's Education Society (Pune) =

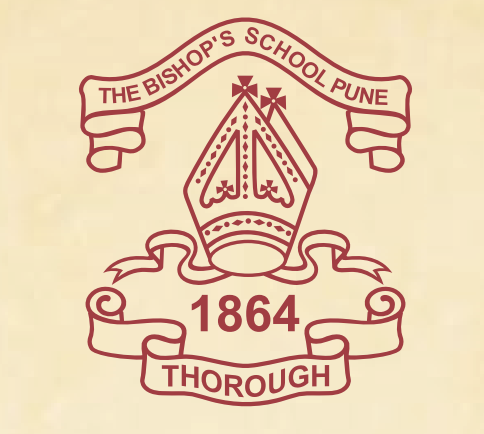

Location
- Pune, Maharashtra; India
- 18.5098605°N 73.8811233°E

Information
- Type: Private; Day; Boarding
- Motto: THOROUGH
- Established: 1864
- Campus: Camp, Kalyani Nagar and Undri
- Colors: Maroon and gold
- Slogan: Play up Bishops, Never let our colours fall
- Affiliations: Council for the Indian School Certificate Examinations
- Website: thebishopsschool.org

The Bishop's Education Society is a private Christian, unaided educational institution in Pune, Maharashtra, India. Founded in 1864, it operates three campuses at Camp, Kalyani Nagar, and Undri, providing education from Nursery to Class XII. The original Camp campus, established in 1864 within the Pune Cantonment, is the oldest of the Society's three campuses.

== History ==
The Bishop's School was founded on 19 April 1864 by Lieutenant Colonel Sydney T. Stock to educate the sons of warrant officers and non-commissioned officers of the British Indian Army.

The institution subsequently developed into a Christian Anglo-Indian minority school and later expanded with the establishment of campuses at Kalyani Nagar and Undri.

The original Camp campus continues to accommodate both day scholars and boarders.

In the 2012 EducationWorld India School Rankings, the school was ranked first in Pune, twelfth in Maharashtra and forty-fourth nationally among day-cum-boarding schools.

== Original campus ==
The original campus, commonly known as The Bishop's School, Camp, is the oldest of the Society's three campuses and is situated within the Pune Cantonment. Founded in 1864, it remains the historic and administrative centre of the institution.

The school was initially established to educate the sons of warrant officers and non-commissioned officers serving in the British Indian Army. During its early years, it operated from former military barracks before relocating to its present site in 1868.

The campus accommodates both day scholars and boarders and contains several of the Society's oldest academic buildings, sports facilities and administrative offices.

== See also ==
- List of schools in Pune
