= Warje =

Warje Warje-Malwadi
- suburb
- Nickname: warje Gaon
- Interactive map of Warje
- Coordinates: 18°29′58″N 73°47′48″E
- Country: India
- State: Maharashtra
- District: Pune
- Named for: ADV.Ranjit Namdev Temghare

Government
  - Body: Pune corporation

Population
  - Total: 120,000

Languages
  - Official: Marathi
- Time zone: UTC+5:30 (IST)
- PIN: 411 058
- Vehicle registration: MH-12
- Nearest city: PUNE
- Vidhan Sabha constituency: Khadakwasala
- Civic agency: Pune corporation

Warje is a suburb of Pune, in the Indian state of Maharashtra. A former village, it was incorporated into the city in 2001.

== Geography ==
Warje is situated about 10 km from the center of Pune. Warje is on the bank of the Mutha river, making the village a catchment area for the western hills due to good soil and sufficient water for farming. It hosts a dense forest in the proximity of the river and creek areas. It borders Kothrud on north, Katraj on south, Narhe and Dhayari Neighbourhoods of Pune.

At the Warje junction, commonly referred to as the Warje Chowk, one road leads to Deccan Gymkhana, via Karve Road, and the other to Khadakwasla dam, one source of Pune's drinking water, and the National Defense Academy (India), one of India's premier military training institutes.

== History ==
Before 1970, Warje was a small village with farming as the main economic activity. Warje was one of the stops during sheep migration from Konkan to regions inland. Warje lies between Sinhagad Fort and Pune. Signs of this linkage can be seen in rocky areas next to Ganpati temple at the west of the town. Ganpati temple has existed since 1982 and probably for quite some time before that. The temple was rebuilt in 1990 and is known as Ganpati Mathab. Warje gaon existed in Shivaji's era.

After 1970, Pune's population increased dramatically. This led Warje to develop as a suburb. Major parts of the forest and fertile lands were converted to apartment complexes. Most of the land became occupied by housing complexes.

Warje used to be one of the Octroi checkpoints.

== Real estate ==
Because of its proximity to downtown and to the National Defence Academy (preventing development to the west), land prices in Warje-Malwadi have skyrocketed.

The smaller region of 'Malwadi' within Warje has seen rapid growth in the new millennium mostly due to the advent of several large housing complexes. Population boomed increasing stress on public infrastructure.

Each morning just under the Warje flyover bridge, a crowd of labourers await daily work from contractors, transporters and construction companies.

== Transport ==
Warje is connected by an extensive network of local municipal city buses to all parts of Pune. The buses operate from the "Ganpati Matha" bus station in Malwadi and connect the suburb to Swargate, Katraj, Shivajinagar, Pune station, Market Yard, Kothrud etc. and even up to Chinchwad and Nigdi. It is near to Sinhgad fort, an attractive fort near Pune. Karve road connects it to Kothrud, Narhe road connects it to Narhe and Dhayari as well Sinhgad road to Sinhgad fort. The AH 47 or NH 48 passes through the suburb making it one of the highly trafficked areas of Pune. NH 48 connects it to rest of Pune (Katraj, Bavdhan).

== See also ==
- Pune
- List of neighbourhoods in Pune
