= Karvenagar =

Karvenagar Hingne
- Neighborhood
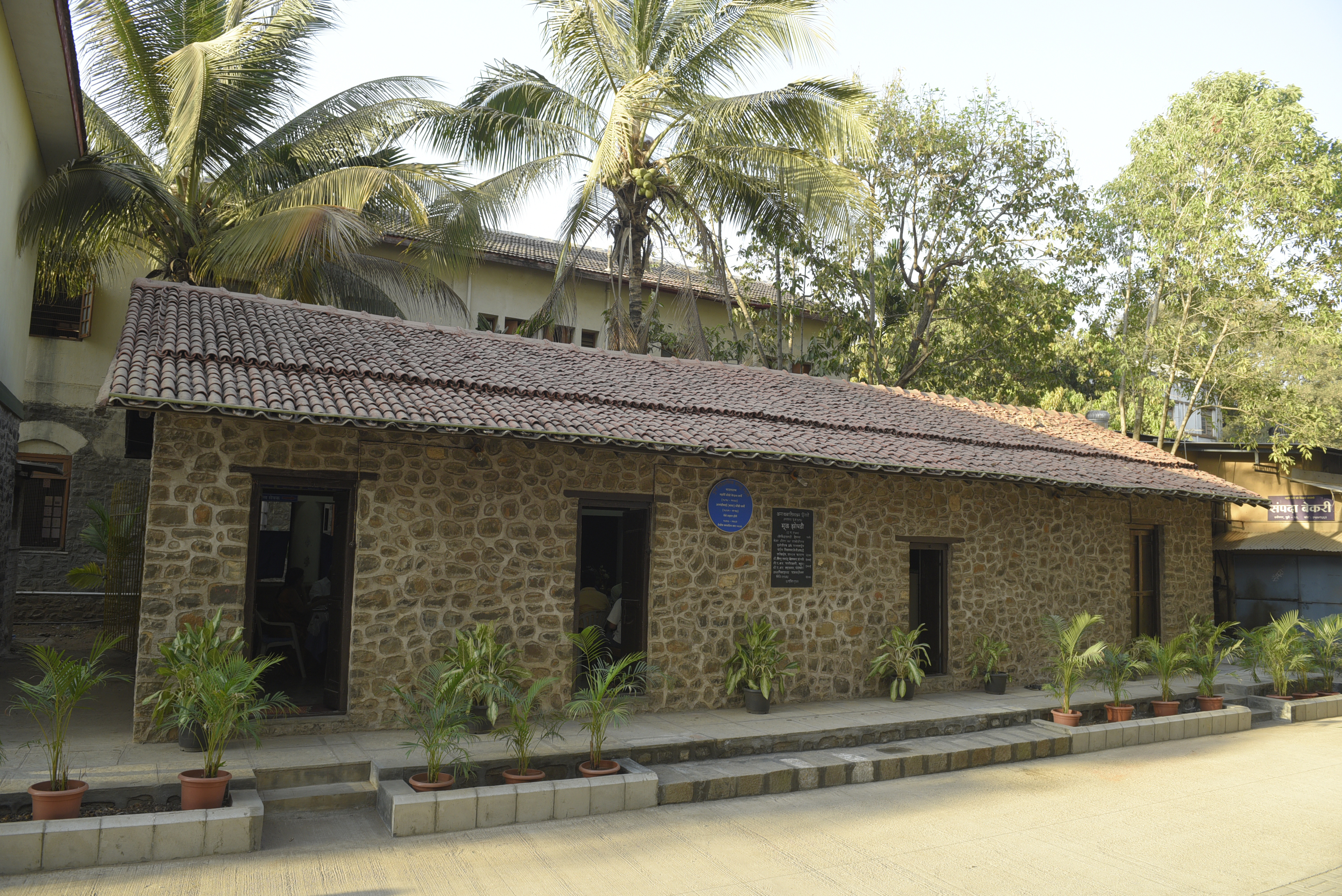
- Maharshi Karve Stree Shikshan Samstha established by Dhondo Keshav Karve

- Location in Maharashtra, India
- Coordinates: 18.4874262°N 73.8197098°E
- State: Maharashtra
- Lok Sabha constituency: Pune
- Vidhan Sabha constituency: Haveli taluka

Karve-Nagar is a suburb located in Pune. Formerly known as Hingne, it was renamed after Dhondo Keshav Karve, a social reformer who advocated widow remarriage and established a Aanath Ashram and first school for girls and widows, which came to be known as Hingne Stree Shikshan Sanstha here in 1896. It is bordered by Warje and Kothrud and its pin code is 411052.
