= Ajeenkya DY Patil University =

Private university in Pune, India

Coordinates: 18.6210°N 73.9118°E

Ajeenkya D. Y. Patil University
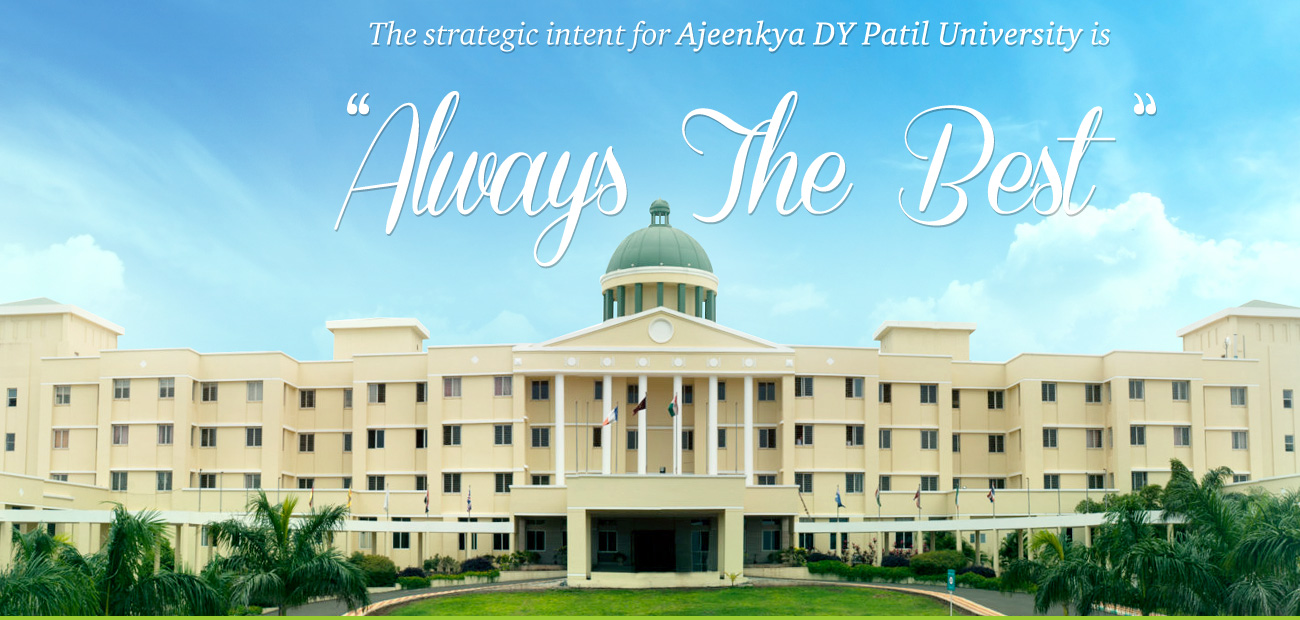
- Type: Private
- Established: 2015
- Founder: D. Y. Patil
- Affiliations: UGC
- Chairperson: Pooja Patil
- President: Dr. Ajeenkya D. Y. Patil
- Vice-Chancellor: Dr. Rakesh Kumar Jain
- Location: Lohegaon, Pune, Maharashtra, India
- Website: adypu.edu.in
- Location within Maharashtra Location within India

Ajeenkya D. Y. Patil University (ADYPU) is a private University located in Lohegaon, Pune, Maharashtra, India and belongs to the DY Patil group, a network of educational institutions in India.

== President ==
Ajeenkya DY Patil is the university's president as well as chairman of Ajeenkya DY Patil Group.
