= Juvenile Justice Board =

Quasi-judicial body in India

Juvenile Justice Boards are Indian quasi-judicial bodies that decide whether juveniles accused of a crime should be tried as an adult.

== History ==
Juvenile Justice Boards were formed by State Governments under the Juvenile Justice (Care and Protection of Children) Act, 2015.

== Members of the board and eligibility ==
Each Juvenile Justice Board consists of one first-class judicial magistrate and two social workers at least one of whom is a woman. They are paid an honorarium. Terms last two years for those of ages 35–65. To qualify as a board member, the applicant should have been engaged for seven years in the areas of health, education or other child welfare activities or should be a qualified professional with a degree from an accredited Institute and practicing in Law, Sociology, Psychology, or Psychiatry relating to children.

== Functions ==
Juvenile Justice Boards have the following functions:

- To be informed of the details on the presence of children and their parents/guardians during the proceedings before the board.
- Ensure protection of children's rights during the course of legal proceedings.
- Provide a translator or interpreter if he/she is unable to understand the language used in legal proceedings.
- Ensure that proceedings are followed in accordance with section 14 of the Juvenile Justice Act.
- Any other functions assigned to the board as per the Juvenile Justice Act.

== Pre-requisites for consideration as a minor ==
The Juvenile Justice Board considers the following circumstances before declaring any juvenile as minor:

- Physical ability of the juvenile to commit alleged crime.
- Mental ability of the juvenile.
- Potential of the juvenile to analyse and understand crime consequences.
- Circumstances leading to the commitment of alleged offence.

Juveniles classified as adults may face serious punishments such as life imprisonment that are applicable for adult criminals.

== Appeals ==
Appeals against the Board's order can be made to the Children's Court. Subsequently, orders of the Children's court can be appealed in the High Court.

== Controversies and Criticism ==
The Juvenile Justice Board has faced criticism in the trial of the 2012 Delhi gang rape and murder. The juvenile defendant Mohammed Afroz was not allowed to be trial as adult, with the JJB rejecting the plea of Delhi Police to conduct a bone ossification test. Despite being labeled as the most brutal in the crime, he was subsequently sentenced to 3 years in a Juvenile Reform Facility, which earned criticism from activists and lawyers. He was released in December 2015 after his term finished, and protests took place at the time of his release. Afroz's family ostracized him in the aftermath of his crime. Following his release, Afroz has been reported to be working as a cook somewhere in South India, while his identity through his photograph remains hidden for his safety.

Following the arrest of the minor accused Vedant Agarwal in the 2024 Pune Porsche hit-and-run case, which led to the death of 2 software engineers in Kalyani Nagar, Pune he was granted bail by the JJB and asked to write a 300 word essay. The decision sparked nation-wide outrage and public outcry from political leaders and the general public. Following the protests against the order, the bail was canceled and Agarwal was remanded back into custody of an observation home. Pune Police officials later moved to the Bombay High Court to try Agarwal as an adult. Subsequently, Agarwal was later granted bail by the Mumbai High Court and was remanded into the care of his maternal aunt, which further sparked outrage. On 15 July 2025, the Juvenile Justice Board (JJB) dismissed the Pune police's request to prosecute the minor involved in the fatal Porsche accident as an adult.

Between February and March 2026, the Juvenile Justice Board faced widespread condemnation in cases where minors involved in underage driving and hit-and-run, which led to death of civilians on two-wheelers, were granted bail on frivolous grounds - in a case in Delhi, the 17-year old minor was granted interim bail for giving class 10 exams. In another case that took place in a suburb of Mumbai, the minor, who was also 17 years old, was granted bail, which sparked protests among the victim's family.

== See also ==
- Juvenile Court
