= Hefei student protests =

2003 student protests in Hefei, China

2003 Hefei Student Protests, also known as The January 7th incident (一七事件), were protests started on January 7, 2003 in Hefei, Anhui by students from the Hefei University of Technology. These protests were the People's Republic of China's largest student protests since the 1989 Tiananmen Square protests and massacre.

== Background ==
At around 7:30 pm on January 6, 2003, at the intersection of Tunxi and Xuancheng Rd (near the southern entrance to the Hefei University of Technology), there was a car accident that caused the injury of three female students. Two of the students, English and Commerce joint majors at Hefei University, died from the accident (the former, An Ruifang, died from a cracked skull), and the third student was seriously injured.

In the afternoon of January 7, 2003, an influential newspaper in Anhui Province called the Xinan Evening Post (新安晚报) published a controversial article saying that the students were victims to a driver who had overrun a red light. Authorities also initially claimed that the accident was the victims' fault. These roused dissatisfaction amongst the students at the university, which was a cause of the protests afterwards.

== Progress of the protest ==
=== Provincial movement ===
At 12 noon on January 7, students from Hefei University of Technology gathered at the front gate, blocking the traffic on Tunxi and Xuancheng roads. They demanded that all cars circle around them, and that all motorcycles and other vehicles be pushed. Later, students put up the slogan "还我同学，严惩凶手", or "Return our classmate, punish the assailant".

At around 2 pm, 5000 students and some social workers from Hefei University of Technology converged at Changjiang Rd, one of the most important roads in Hefei, and soon marched into the provincial hall. It was only after much dissuasion from professors and students alike that they were finally convinced to leave the compound.

At 2:10 pm, Anhui Province's Superintendent of Education asked to speak with a student representative. However, the students believed that Superintendent Chen Xianzhong's rank wasn't high enough, and called for a different representative. Afterwards, more students joined in and they began displaying the slogans "Only twenty-two" and "What are the 'Three Represents'?". At this point in time, the number of students reached nearly 10000, and at 2:40 pm, the students decided to overtake the provincial hall again. At 3 pm, once again after dissuasion from professors and other students, the protesters left the building again.

At 4:34 pm, Anhui's Superintendent Chen Xianzhong once again attempted to speak with the students, and brought up four points:

1. They had already found three suspects
2. Tomorrow (January 8) they would convene for a conference on the matter
3. They would urge the traffic police to do a better job of policing
4. They request the students go back to school.

However, the students at the protest objected to these four points.

=== Xinan Evening Post Protests ===
At around 6 pm, the students protested at the Xinan Evening Post's office. They complained that the Xinan Evening Post had been lying to them, and demanded a public apology from the newspaper. The Xinan Evening Post's chief editor spoke with the students and brought up four points:

1. They would publicly apologize in a visible part of the paper
2. They would correct the article
3. They would do something about the reporter who had caused the mistake
4. Would call on someone to guarantee traffic safety before the 15th

After this, the students began to split into two parties. The hardliners wanted the Xinan Evening Post to place their apology on the front page, or else they would attack the Post's office. A different group of students wanted everyone to remain calm and rational. The hardliners began to attack the newspaper's office and tried to plan a surprise attack on the newspaper's chief editor. Under the police's protection, the chief editor was able to retreat into the newspaper's office building. However, at this point, the situation became out of control and the hardliners began attacking the newspaper's facilities, showing tendencies towards arson. After further persuasion from professors and students, all protesters finally left the building at 6:16 pm.

=== Memorial service ===
At around 7 pm, the area in front of the entrance to Hefei University of Technology remained closed to vehicles. As the night closed in, students began to spontaneously light candles, provide flowers and other items of mourning in order to mourn and commemorate the accident victims. Many students and passersby participated in the memorial, and the mourning continued until early morning.

At 5 am on January 8, the items of mourning were moved away and the memorial service ended. Vehicles also were allowed into the previously closed off area, marking the end of the protests.

== Handling ==
The handling of the Hefei student protest had been effective if its dispersal later was any indication. While the protesters were dissatisfied with the initial actions with respect to the commission of the crime as well as its resolution, there was no violent dispersal, which could have aggravated the situation. This can be attributed to the immediate response of the national government to the crisis. When news broke out about the protest, Hu Jintao, the then newly installed General Secretary of the Chinese Communist Party (CCP) and the figure being groomed to be head of state during the March National People's Congress (NPC), expressed his sympathy for the Hefei students, urging authorities and the protesters to hold dialogues to resolve the unrest. Hu Jintao is the only Anhui native, occupying the highest position in national politics during the period.
