= Phoenix Marketcity, Pune =

Shopping mall in Pune, Maharashtra, India

Phoenix Avenue of Stars
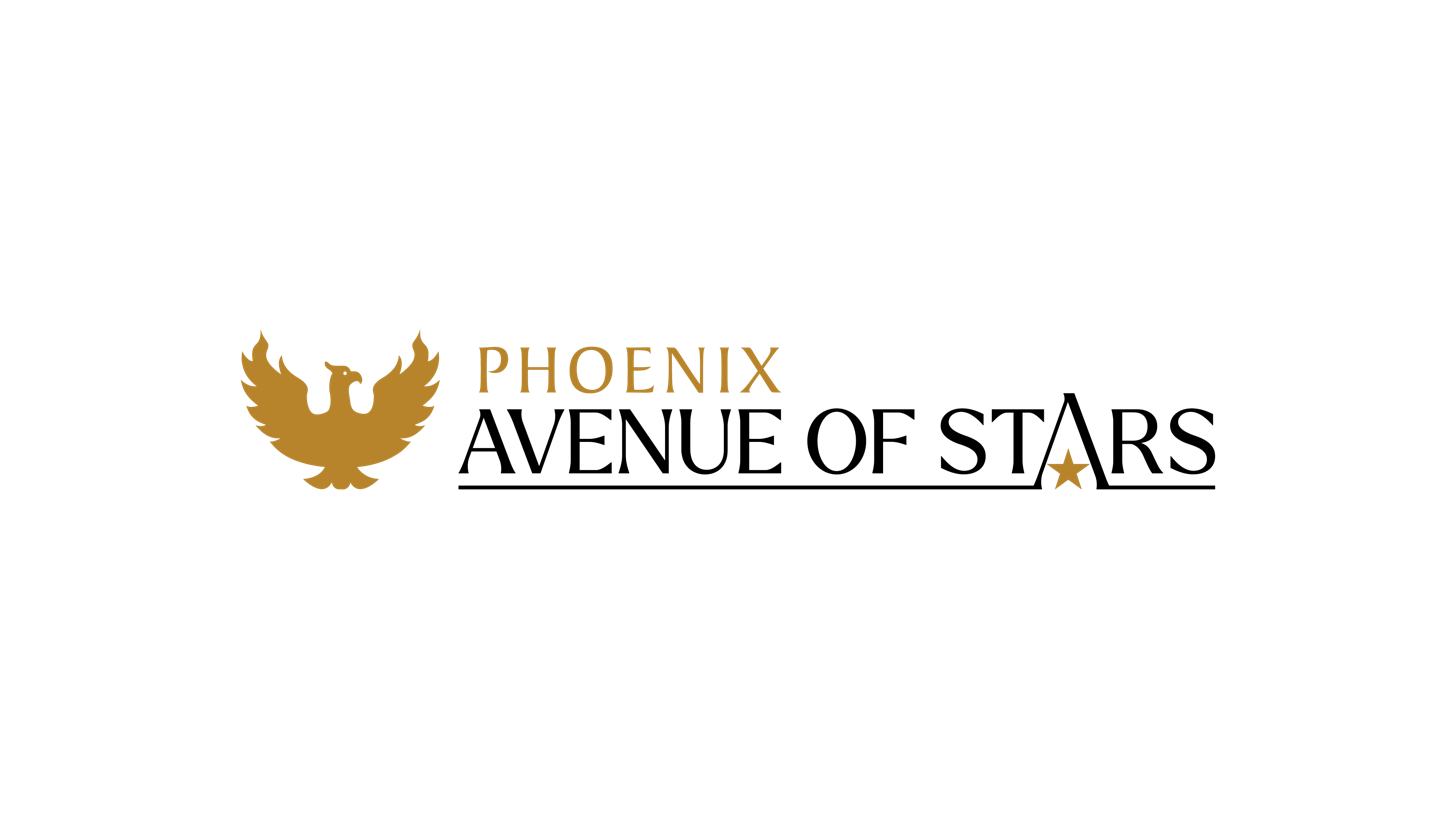

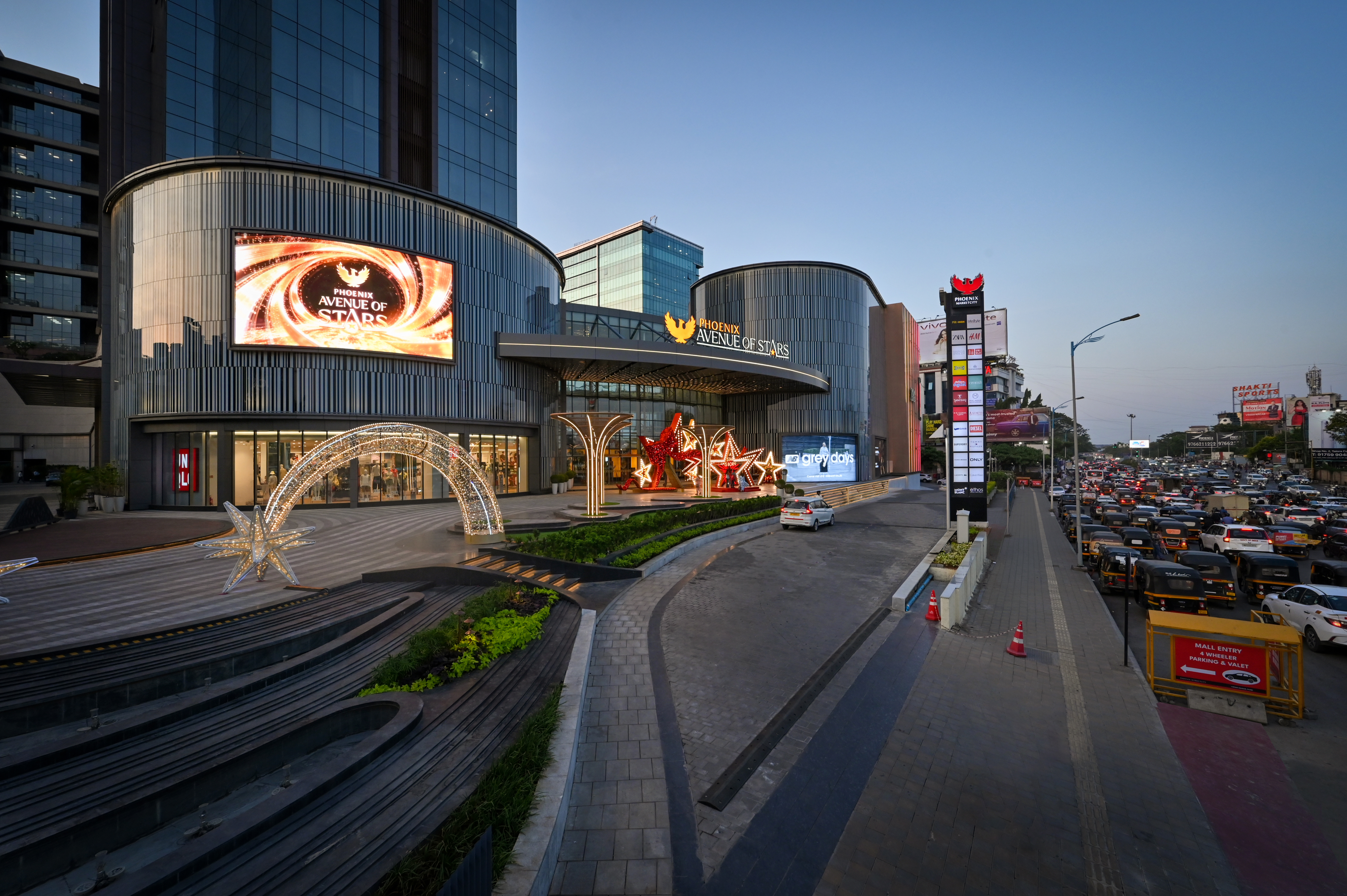
- Facade of Phoenix Avenue of Stars, Vimannagar
- Location: Vimannagar, Pune
- Coordinates: 18°33′44″N 73°55′00″E
- Opened: June 2011
- Manager: The Phoenix Mills Limited
- Owner: Atul Ruia
- Architect: Benoy (HONG KONG) & P. G. Patki
- Num. of stores: 350+
- Floor area: 1.19 Million Sq. ft.
- Parking: 2500+

Phoenix Avenue of Stars is a shopping mall developed by Phoenix Mills Limited, located in Pune, Maharashtra. It was opened in June 2011 and is one of the largest malls in India, with a retail area of 1.19 million square feet. It is located in the Vimannagar area of Pune.

== Location ==
Phoenix Avenue of Star, Pune is located in Viman Nagar, an area in the East of Pune with connectivity to the city, to the airport, the railway station and the upcoming Ramwadi metro station which is barely 0.3 km from the mall.

== Size and outlets ==
Phoenix Avenue of Stars has a total gross leasable area of 1.19 Million sq. ft. It is a multi-level building.
