= Fitzgerald Bridge, Pune =

Historical bridge in Pune, India

Fitzgerald Bridge
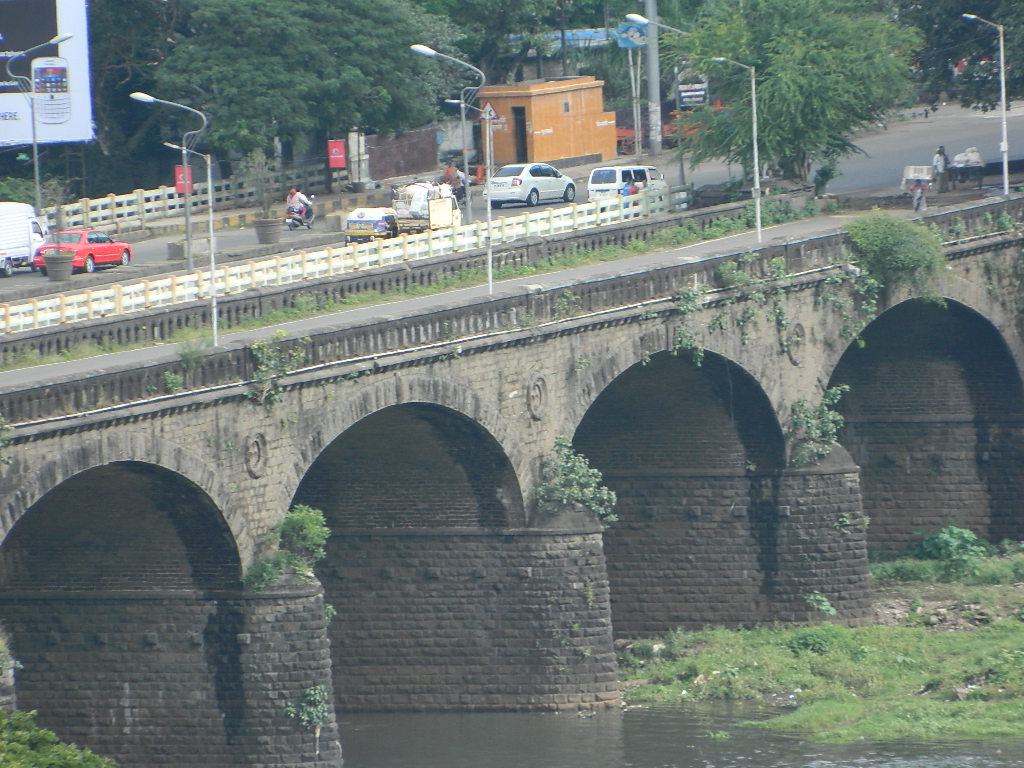
- Modern view of the bridge
- Coordinates: 18.5433°N 73.8849°E
- Named for: William Robert Vesey Fitzgerald

History
- Designer: Captain Robert S. Sellon
- Constructed by: Royal Engineers
- Construction end: circa 1867

Location
- Interactive map of Fitzgerald Bridge

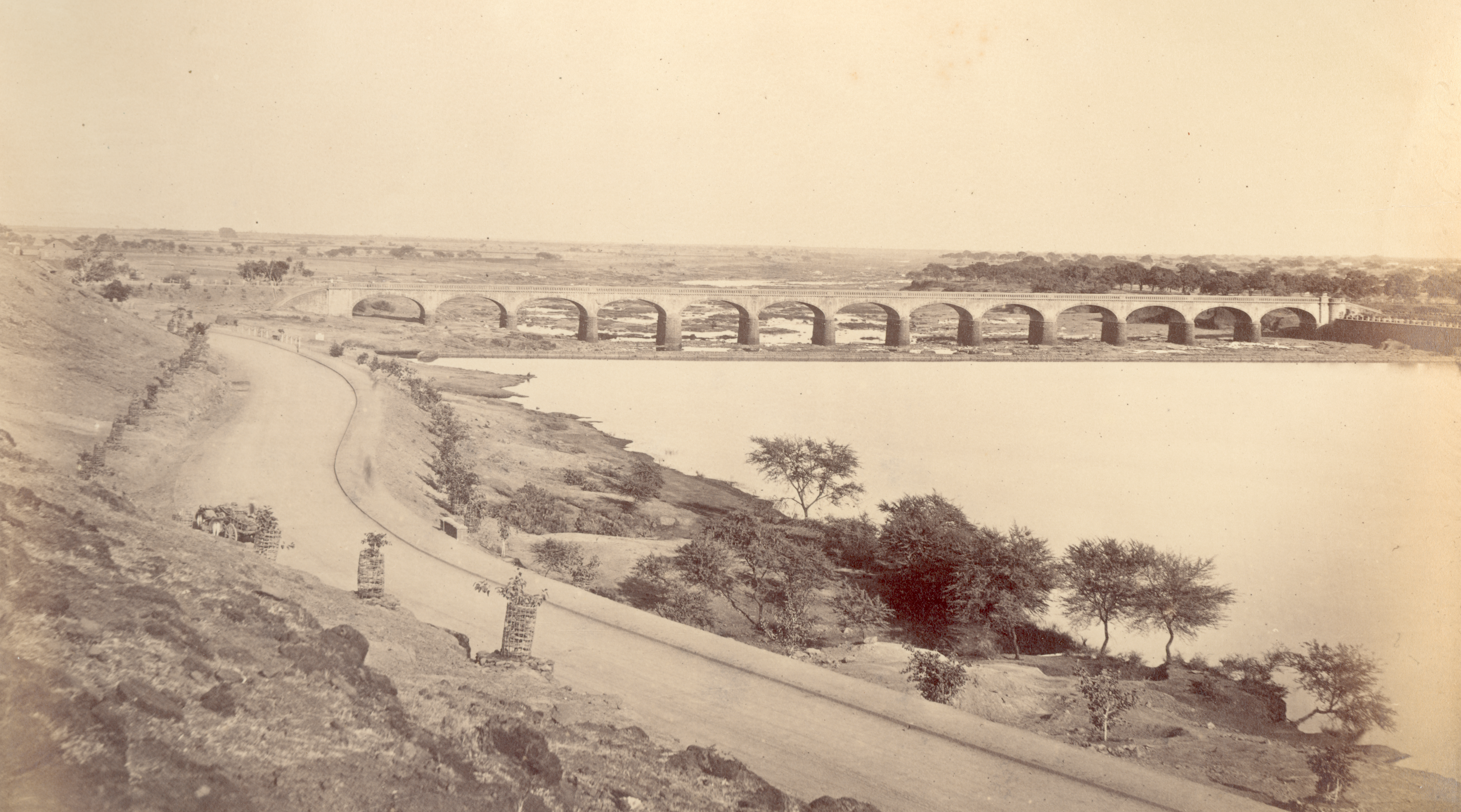
View of the bridge, around 1875.

The Fitzgerald Bridge (also known as the Bund Garden Bridge) is an historic structure located in Pune, India. It was constructed in 1867 during the British India period. It was the first spandrel arch bridge in the city of Pune, connecting the Bund Garden to the Chima garden.

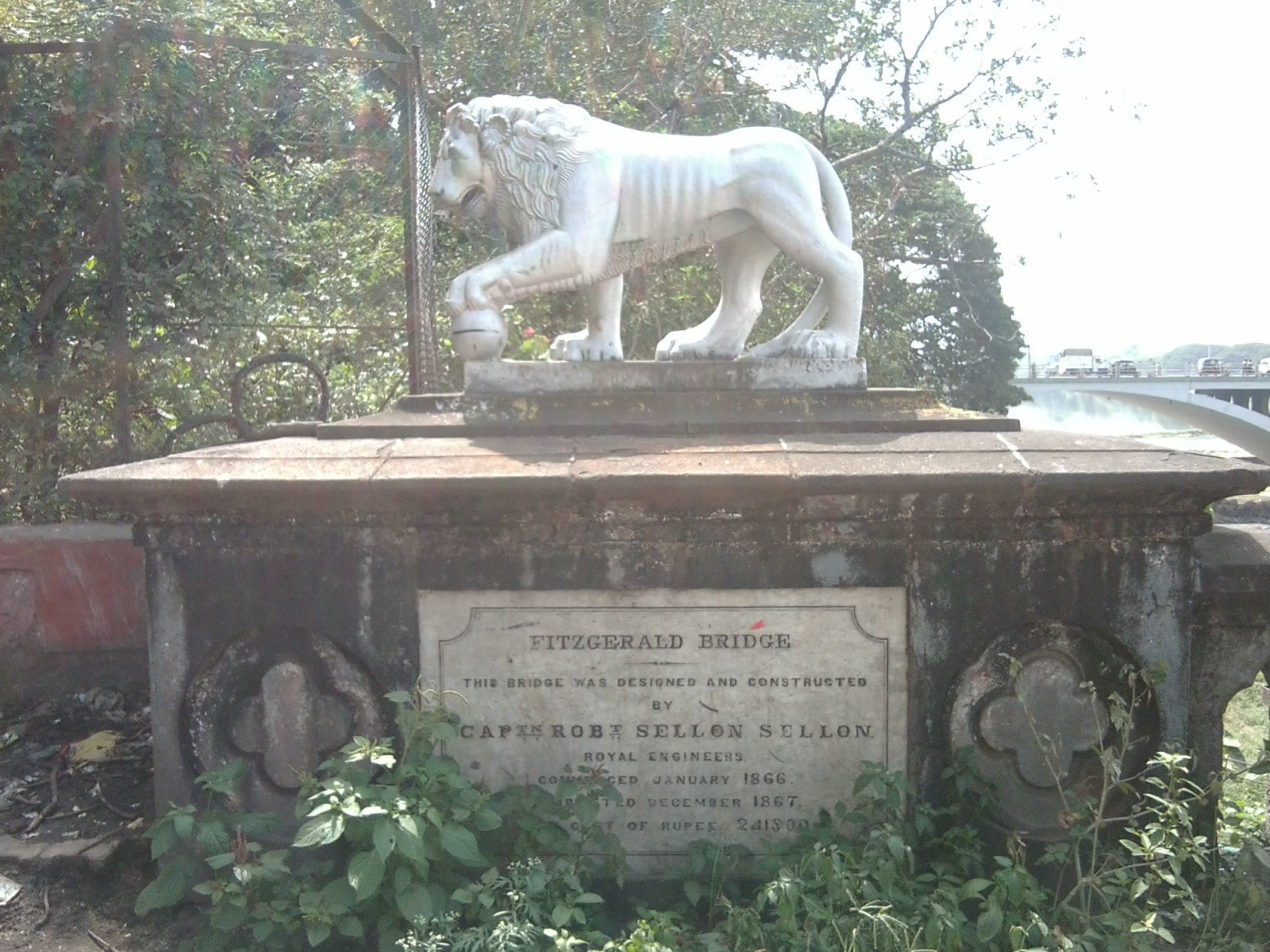
View of the Medici lion at the end of the bridge.

The bridge crosses the Mula-Mutha River. It features a representation of a Medici lion at each end of the bridge. The bridge was designed and constructed by Captain Robert S. Sellon of the Royal Engineers. It was built for the sum of ₹ 2 lakh. The Bridge is named for the Governor of Bombay at the time, Sir William Robert Vesey Fitzgerald.

By 2013, the two lane masonry arch bridge has over lived its design life span. A new four lane bridge was to replace the structure, with the new bridge to be named after Babasaheb Ambedkar.

There were plans to demolish the bridge but finally it was closed for vehicular traffic and converted into a space for arts and artisans.
