= Bund Garden, Pune =

Garden in the city of Pune

Coordinates: 18°32′30″N 73°53′04″E

Bandh Garden is located 2 km from the Pune Railway Station. The gardens are situated next to Fitzgerald Bridge and take their name from the bandh, or dam, on the Mula river.

== History ==
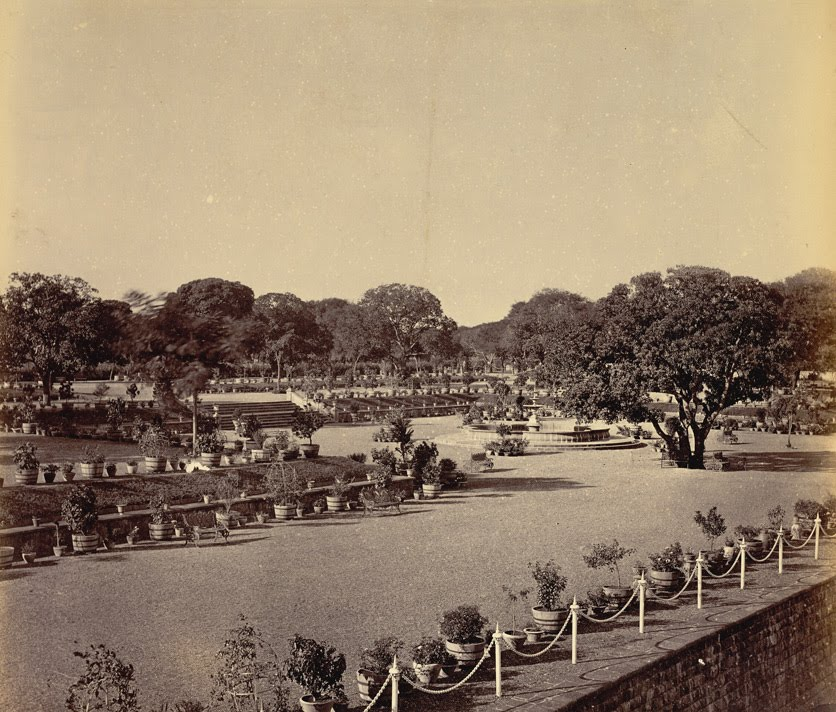
Bund Gardens in the 1870s.

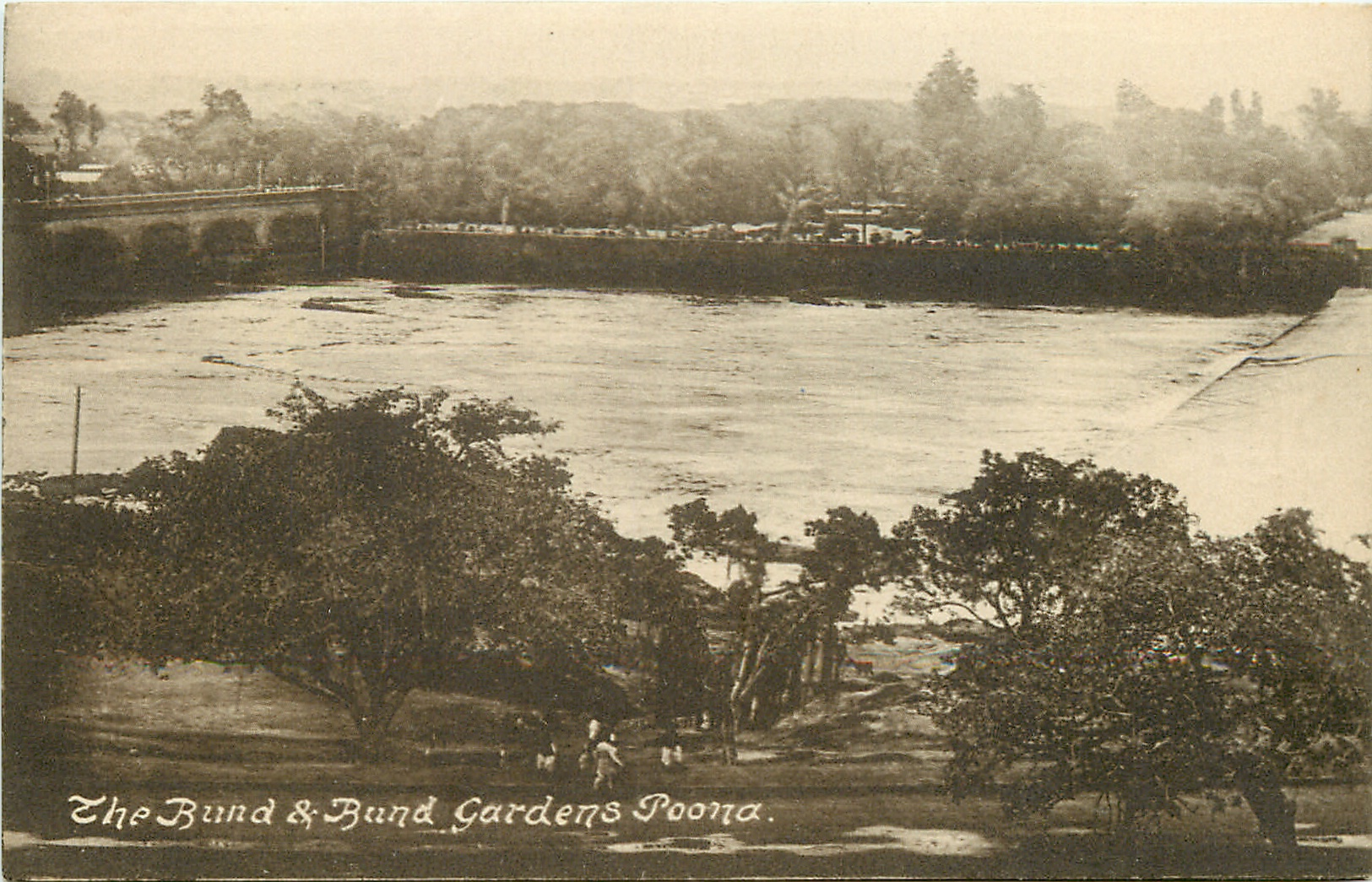
Bund Gardens in the 1930s.

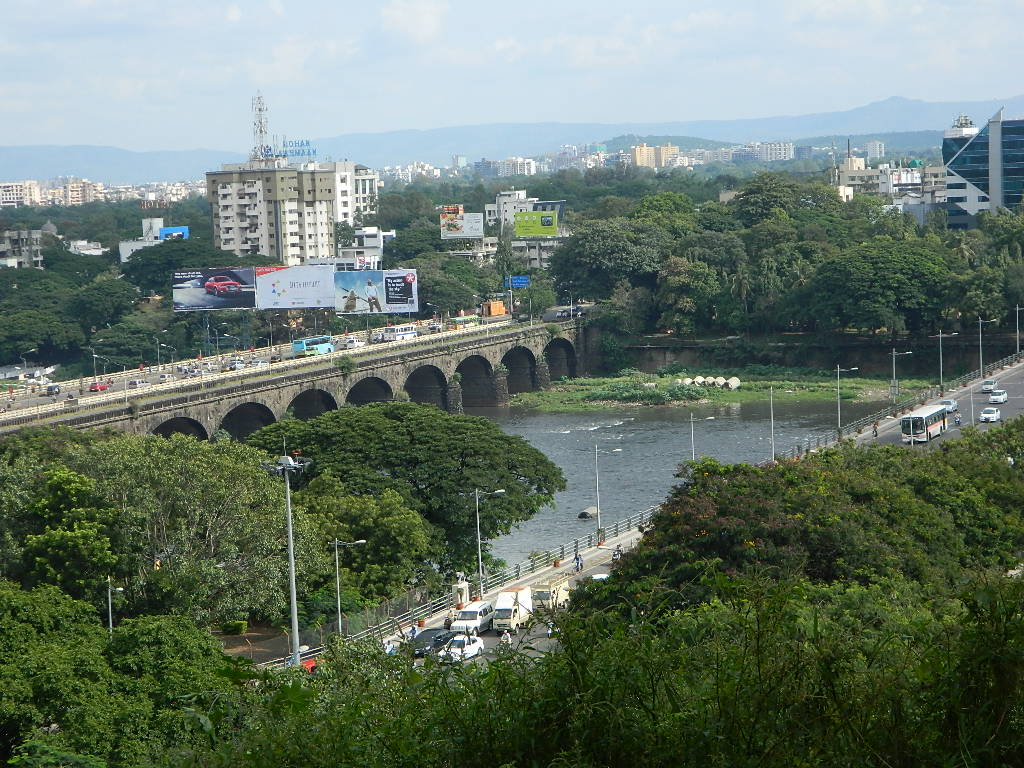
Bandh Gardens in the 2010s.

These mini dams built by Jamsetjee Jejeebhoy, the Parsi businessman and philanthropist, served as a source of irrigation water for the under-privileged. The garden was opened in 1869 when the bridge was completed. It was planned by Colonel Sellon who was able to transform the waste space into a garden, known today as the "Mahatma Gandhi Udyan" a reference to the existing bridge that leads to the Gandhi National Memorial.
