= Lohagaon =

Neighbourhood in Pune, India

Coordinates: 20°36′N 77°41′E

Lohgaon/Lohagaon
- Suburb of Pune
- Lohagaon
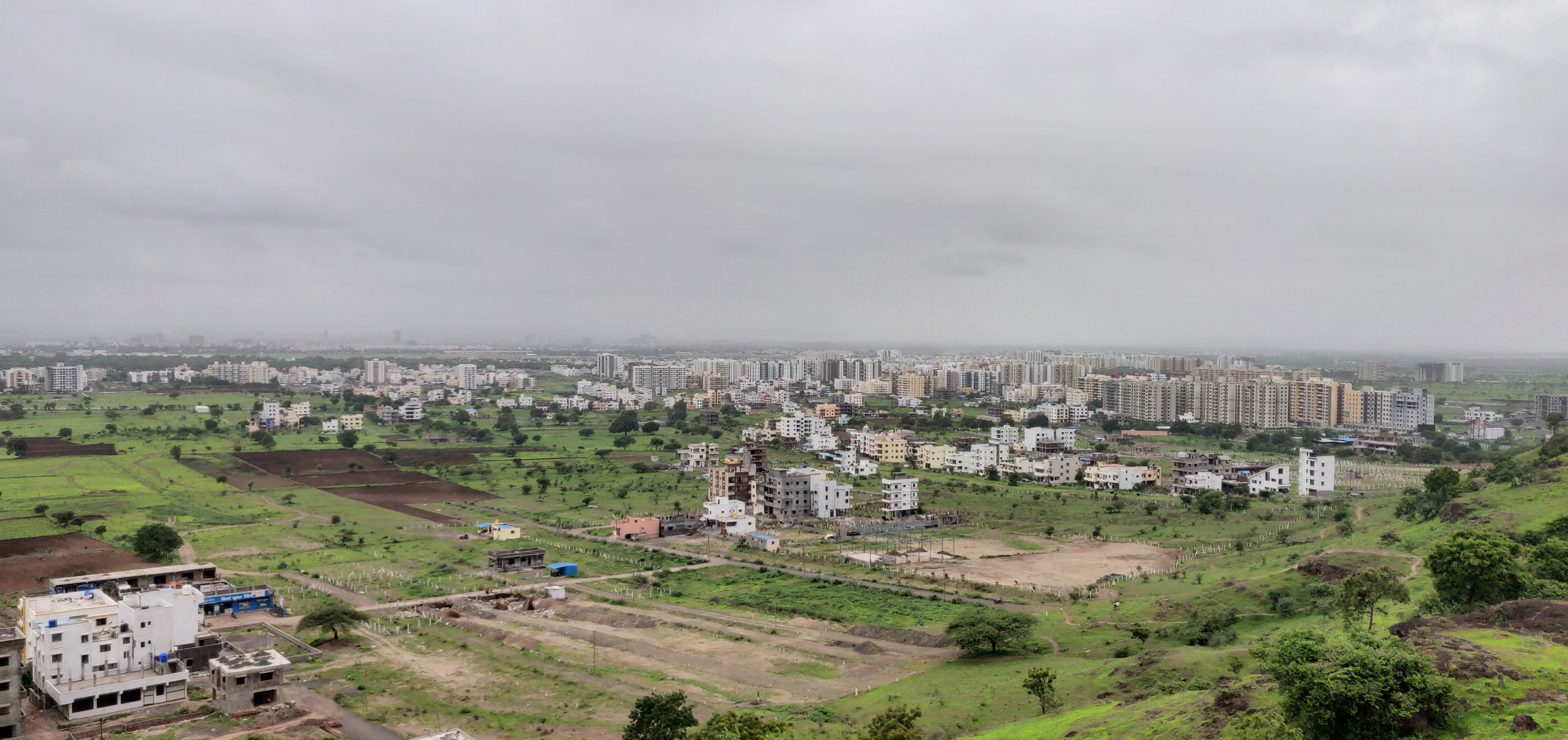
- Lohagaon Skyline as seen from Khandoba Mal near DY Patil University
- Interactive map of Lohgaon/Lohagaon
- Country: India
- State: Maharashtra
- District: Pune
- Taluka: Haveli

Government
  - Body: Pune Municipal Corporation

Area
  - Total: 10.48 km^{2} (4.05 sq mi)
- Elevation: 591.46 m (1,940.5 ft)

Population (2011)
  - Total: 32,857
  - Density: 3,135/km^{2} (8,120/sq mi)
- Demonym: Lohagaonkar

Languages
  - Official: Marathi
- Time zone: UTC+5:30 (IST)
- PIN: 411047
- Vehicle registration: MH-12
- Avg. summer temperature: 33 °C (91 °F)
- Avg. winter temperature: 24 °C (75 °F)

Lohagaon (Lohagāva) is a neighbourhood in northeast Pune, India. There is a grand temple of Shri Sant Tukaram Maharaj in Lohgaon. A big kirtan festival is celebrated every year and a big fair is held. Shiv Jayanti is also celebrated on a large scale every year.

Lohgaon is primarily known for the Pune Airport, a customs airport. It comes under Pune Municipal Corporation. It also has an Indian Air Force Base, which houses the 2 Wing, IAF. Established in 1939, it is one of the oldest air bases in India, after the Ambala Air Base. Many ex-servicemen from different regions of India reside in parts of Lohagaon. The area has grown hugely in this decade as a residential area due to the development of IT Parks in adjoining Viman Nagar. Lohegaon has relatively less buildings and tall structures compared to nearby areas due to its proximity to the airport.

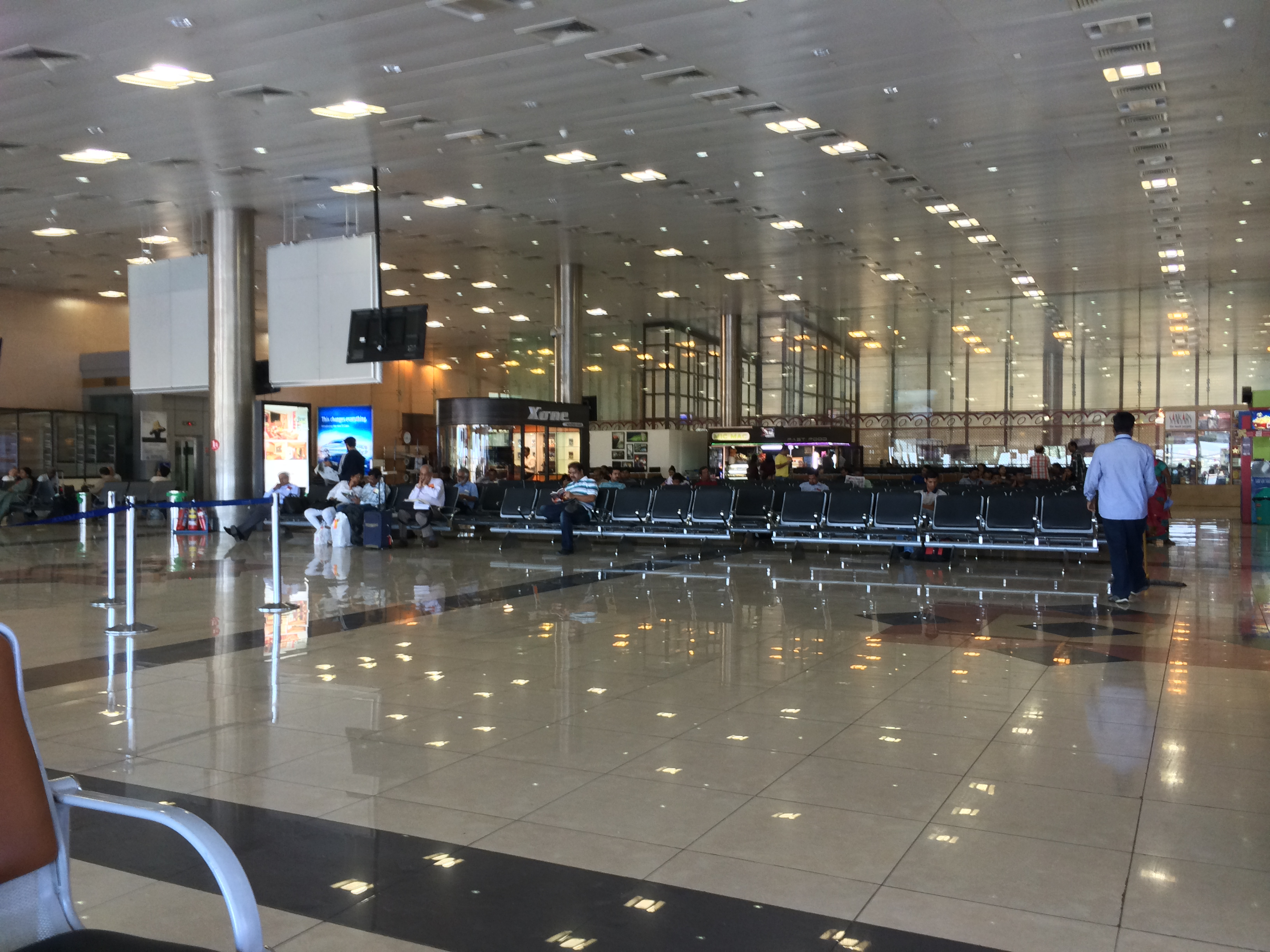
Pune Airport, which is situated in Lohagaon

== History ==
The oldest known available surviving map which shows Lohagaon as a prominent village near Pune in the Maratha Empire was drawn in the year 1793 by William Faden. Hence the original village of Lohagaon is believed to have existed from much before.

Sant Tukaram's mother hailed from Lohagaon, which makes it his maternal hometown. He frequently visited Lohagaon to deliver religious discourses, attracting many disciples from the village. In September 2024, the Maharashtra government approved a proposal to rename the Lohegaon Airport to Jagadguru Sant Tukaram Maharaj Pune International Airport to honour him, and due to this familial connection; and this proposal awaits final approval from the Central Government.

The Air Force base was established at Lohegaon to meet these objectives in 1939 as an RIAF base and since then it has been one of the premier air bases in the country. The first Indian Commanding Officer, Wg Cdr HS Ratnagar took over the base on 21 May 1947. All the aircraft on the inventory of Indian Air Force since Independence have taken to the skies from the Lohegaon Air Base. During 1965 and 1971 Indo-Pakistani Wars this base was utilised as a staging base for fighter and bomber operations.

Administratively, Lohagaon was recognized as a village until its formal merger into the Pune Municipal Corporation (PMC) limits on October 4, 2017. Prior to the merger, it functioned under taluka-level administration but was increasingly treated as an urban outgrowth due to proximity to Pune.

== Name and Etymology ==
The name is composed of two words - "Loh" which means Iron, and "Gaon" which means Village. The name roughly translates to "Iron Village".

The place is referred to as with many different spellings and names in various sources. European Maps from 1793 and 1800 referred to the village as 'Logom' (which is a mistake in Anglicisation of Lohagaon), whereas later British and Indian sources referred to as 'Lohogaon', 'Lohegaon', and 'Lohagaon'.

It is difficult even today to determine which English name is correct and accepted by everyone as various transliterations to English can sound exactly the same as its Marathi counterpart.

Some official sources today refer to it as 'Lohegaon', including the Indian Air Force; whereas some write it 'Lohagaon' and others write it as 'Lohgaon'.

== Demographics ==
=== Language and ethnicity ===
The official language of Lohegaon is Marathi, and it is also the majority language of the area. Due to the presence of ex-servicemen and professionals originating from different regions of India and their families living in some parts of Lohegaon, the area is diverse and has sizable communities of people who speak different languages like Hindi, Urdu, Telugu, Kannada, Bengali, Punjabi etc., as their first language. People of these communities observe their customs and celebrate their regional festivals.

=== Religion ===
The majority population of the area follows Hinduism with the presence of Sikhs, Muslims, and Christians, which is clearly evident from the presence of many Temples, a Gurudwara and a few Churches in the area.

There are many temples in Lohagaon with the most notable ones being the Shree Sant Tukaram Temple (in the heart of Lohagaon) and the Khandoba Temple (on top of the Khandoba Mal) and many others. Lohagaon also has dozens of smaller local temples.

=== Literacy ===
The literacy rate of Lohagaon was 91.34% according to the Indian Census of 2011, which is much higher than both the state and the national average. The male literacy stood at 94.73% while female literacy rate stood at a little less, at 87.34%.

=== Sex ratio ===
The sex ratio stood at 856, which is much lower than the State Average of 929. Whereas, the child sex ratio was higher than the state average of 894, and stood at 912.

Children under the age of seven years made up over 12.27% of the population of Lohagaon in 2011.

== Location and connectivity ==
Lohagaon lies between Vishrantwadi, Viman Nagar, Wagholi and Vadgaon Shinde.

There is a road which connects Lohagaon and Wagholi, which in turn connects to the Ahmednagar Highway. Roads from Vishrantwadi, Dhanori, Vadgaon Sheri and Wagholi all converge at Lohagaon. Lohagaon also has good road connectivity to Alandi road, and hence to areas such as Chakan, Moshi and Nashik Road. This area has a mix of urban and rural landscapes.

Lohagaon has many bus stops, from which commuters can avail Public Transport Buses. Currently there is no other form of public transport connecting the area. Auto Rickshaws and Cabs are available as a means of transport.

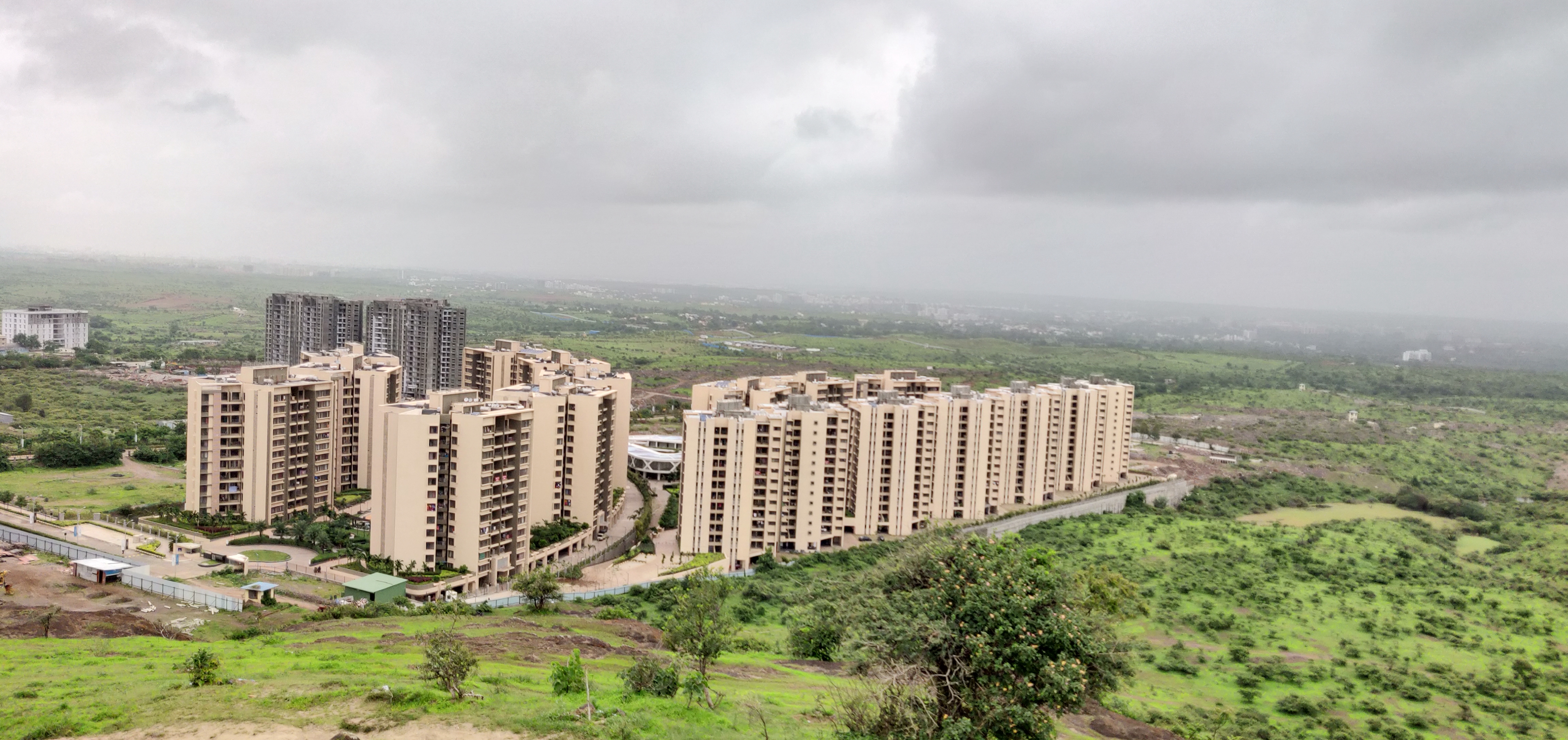
Pride World City in Lohagaon is an integrated township built next to DY Patil College

== Schools ==
Due to the presence of an Indian Air Force Base, there is a Kendriya Vidyalaya, namely Kendriya Vidyalaya No. 1 AFS, Pune in the area.

Other prominent schools include the Government School and many other smaller private schools affiliated to different boards and curricula.

== Entertainment ==
=== Diamond Water Park ===
The Diamond Park, Spread over 25 acres, it was known as the first and largest water park in Pune when founded. In 2006, it was renamed as Diamond Water Park. The park was remodelled by Arjun Indulkar. The rides are designed to suit the varied needs of people of varied age groups. It offers rock climbing and a zipline. The Diamond Waterpark consists of wet bubble, cyclone, play station, Tortuga falls, seven swimming pools, and 32 international rides. There is a pure vegetarian restaurant inside the water park.

== Temples ==
There is a famous Sant Tukaram Temple situated at epicenter of Lohagaon. There is also a Khandoba Temple on top of Khandoba Mal, a hillock, which overlooks the entirety of Lohagaon and most of Northeastern Pune from the very edge of PMC Limits.

== University ==
Lohagaon is home to Ajeenkya DY Patil University and Marathwada Mitramandal's Institute of Technology.
