= Koregaon Park =

Neighbourhood in Pune, Maharashtra, India

Coordinates: 18.535°N 73.895°E

Koregaon Park कोरेगाव पार्क
- Neighbourhood
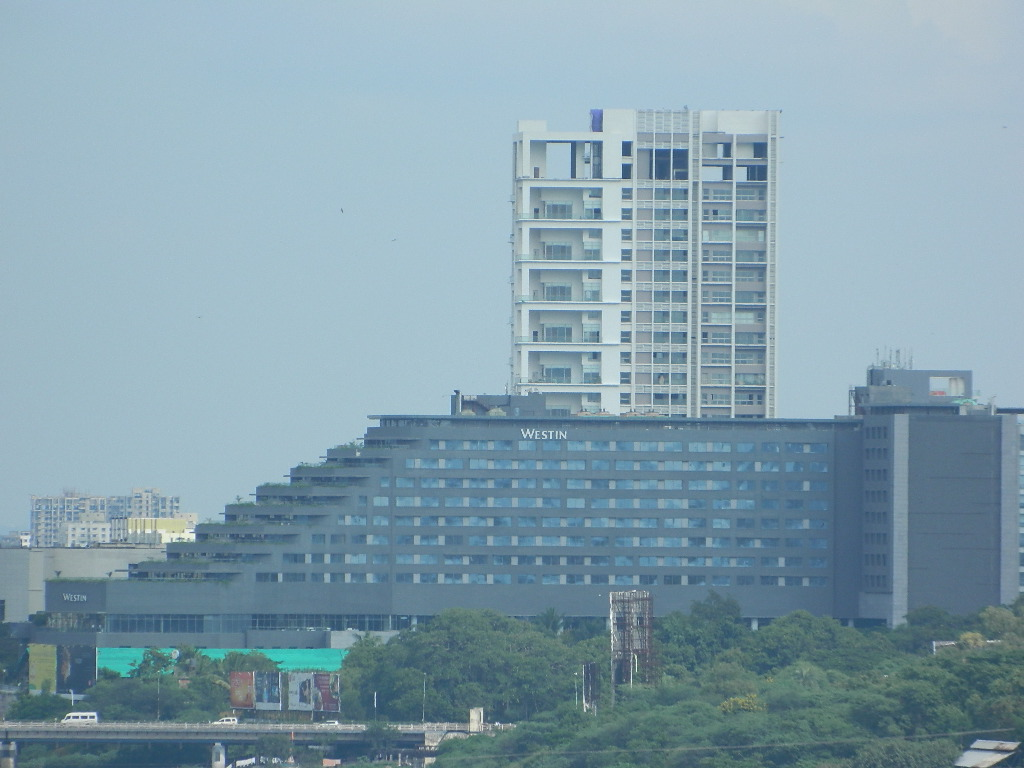
- View of Westin Hotel in Koregoan Park
- Interactive map of Koregaon Park
- Country: India
- State: Maharashtra
- City: Pune

Government
  - Body: Pune Municipal Corporation
- Postal code: 411001

Koregaon Park (earlier Koregaon Road Estate) is an area located in Pune, in the state of Maharashtra in India. It is primarily a residential area with lush greenery, but of late it has been growing into a commercial hub as well. Koregaon Park also has a trendy dining and nightlife hub, with sleek European and Indian restaurants, as well as live music bars and buzzy pubs. It is also a destination for art and music enthusiasts in the city, with many art galleries and clubs in the vicinity. Koregaon Park is located about 5.8 kilometres (3.6 mi) from the Pune International Airport and about 3.8 kilometres (2.4 mi) from the Pune Junction railway station.

== History ==
Earlier Ahmednagar road (Nagar road) was known as Koregaon road, as the Koregaon Bhima village also falls on this road.

In early 1920s, British colonials settled into a neighbourhood on the lands of Ghorpuri village, which was just outside of Pune. This neighbourhood was named Koregaon Road Estate, since this was in proximity to then Koregaon road (today's Ahmednagar road). The estate was divided into several plots, many of which were auctioned and purchased by rich merchants or the princely/royal families of India. Some specific plots were also reserved for the Military and Postal Department. This led to Koregaon Road becoming one of the most up-market areas in Pune, even today.

Later, the road was renamed to Ahmednagar road and the neighbourhood renamed to Koregaon Park—to avoid confusion pertaining to its older road name and the Koregaon Bhima village.

== Roads ==
Koregaon Park has two major roads: North Main Road (lies in the north of Koregaon Park) which runs in parallel to South Main Road (lies in the south of Koregaon Park). Numerous link roads connect these two major roads.

The lanes of Koregaon park are lined with old British era bungalows and huge green trees, attracting lots of people who visit for morning or evening walks, or just to hang out.

Koregaon Park is connected to Yerawada, via the Bund Garden bridge and to Kalyani Nagar, via the Aga Khan Bridge. It also connected to Pune Camp and Magarpatta.

== Nightlife ==
The lanes numbered 6 and 7 have many pubs and food joints, which add to the city's nightlife and attract the youth of Pune.

The Westin and the Conrad hotels are both located in Koregaon Park. Other major hotels are The O Hotel and Blue Diamond by Taj Hotels.

== Osho International Meditation Resort ==
The Osho International Meditation Resort, which was earlier known as the Osho Ashram, still attracts many foreign visitors and locals, who mainly visit for meditation programs. The Osho Teerth Park, on the D. H. Dhunjibhoy Road, between lane 2 and 3, is a park that was originally constructed on a sewage wasteland, and has since been beautified with statues, bamboos, exotic plants, ferns, flowers etc. It is another place where people often come for picnics and to spend time with each other.;

== Chabad house ==
A Jewish Chabad house is located in Koregaon Park.

== Schools and colleges ==
The Poona School and Home for Blind is located on North Main Road. The Sant Gadge Maharaj School is located on South Main Road. The Saint Mira's Women's College is located on a link road, Pujya Kasturba Gandhi English and Marathi Medium School on North Main Road

== 2010 Pune bombing ==
On 13 February 2010, a terrorist attack took place in the neighbourhood when the German Bakery was bombed, killing 18.
