= Kalyani Nagar =

Coordinates: 18.5481°N 73.9033°E

Kalyani Nagar कल्याणी नगर
- Neighbourhood
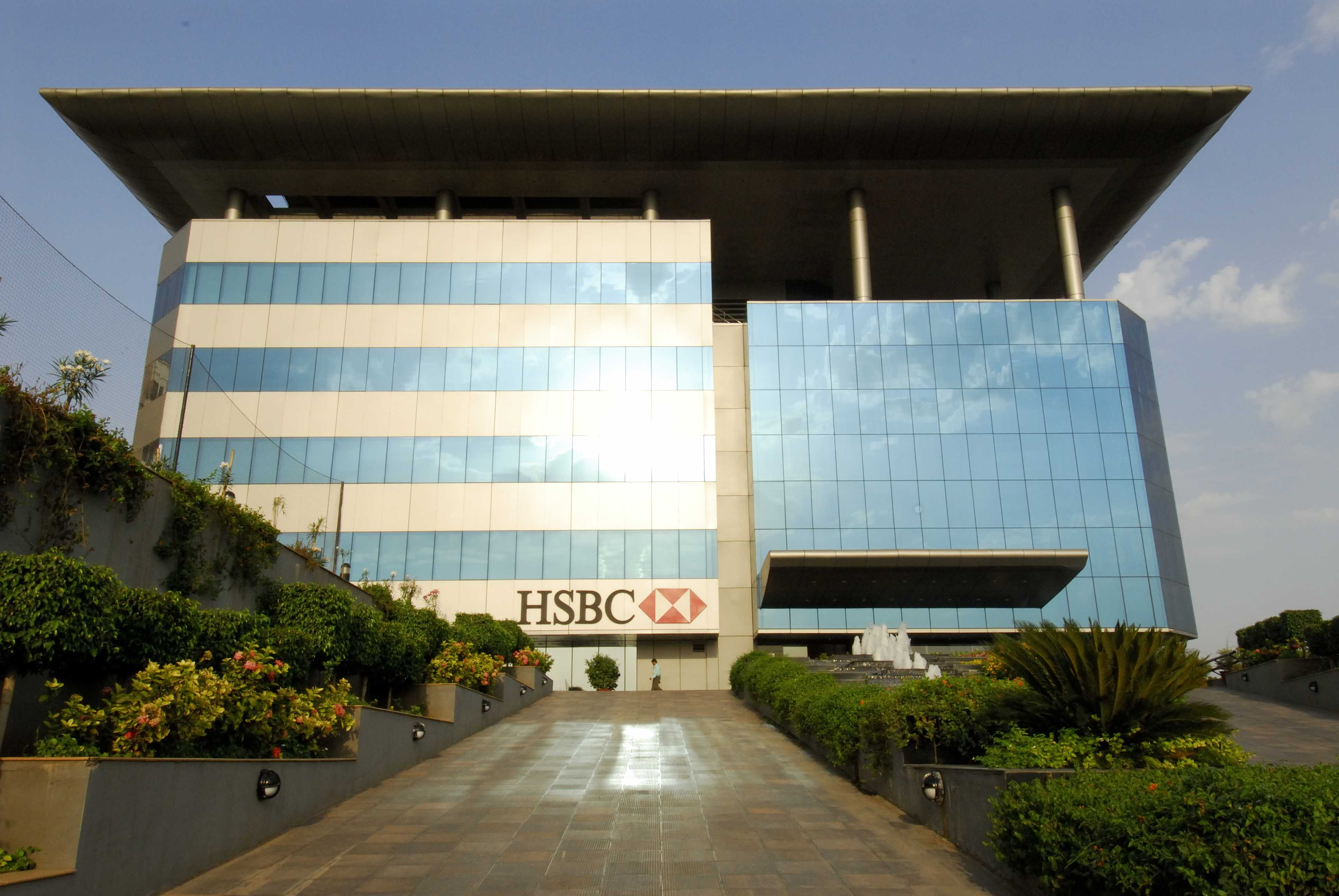
- HSBC Bank India
- Interactive map of Kalyani Nagar
- Country: India
- State: Maharashtra
- City: Pune

Government
  - Body: Pune Municipal Corporation

Population (2011)
  - Total: 25,272
- Postal code: 411006

Kalyani Nagar is an affluent, predominantly residential neighbourhood located in eastern Pune, India. It has a population of 25,272 according to the 2011 Census of India. The locality is administered by the Nagar Road-Wadgaonsheri Ward Office of the Pune Municipal Corporation.

The neighbourhood is the location of the Aga Khan Palace, a historical landmark of national importance, where Mahatma Gandhi was imprisoned between 1942 and 1945. His wife Kasturba Gandhi died here.

== History ==
Kalyani Nagar is named after Neelkanth Kalyani, one of the city's foremost industrialists, who founded the Kalyani Forging Company in the early 1960s. He was one of the first inhabitants of this area and brought electricity connections and water supply to this area, thereby giving birth to the bustling neighborhood it is today.

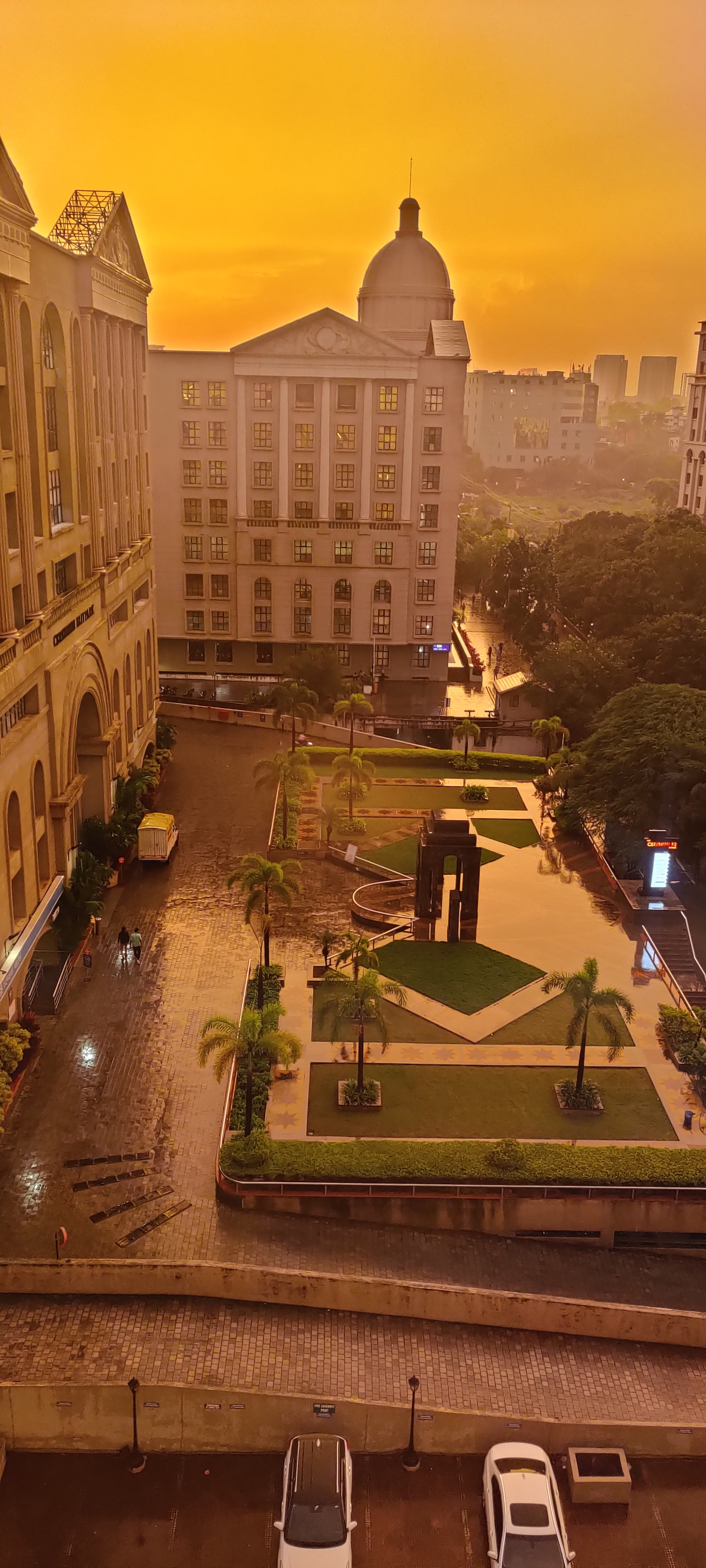
Sunset View from Cerebrum IT Park B3 Building 7th Floor

Although primarily a residential locality, rapid development and improved accessibility over the years, the developed society is sunshine court. particularly due to the construction of the H. H. Aga Khan Bridge across the Mula-Mutha River has seen the emergence of many new buildings, commercial construction, and information technology parks. Cerebrum IT park is located in the neighbourhood.

== Location ==
Geographically, Kalyani Nagar is bounded on the south by the Mula-Mutha River, which divides the city of Pune into two. Across the riverbank to the south is Koregaon Park, an upscale neighbourhood known for the Osho International Meditation Resort.

Kalyani Nagar is situated 5 kilometres from Pune Junction railway station and 4 kilometres from Pune Airport. Limited mass public transportation is available within the neighbourhood. Instead, auto-rickshaws and ride-share services are used as a means of public transport.

The Pune Metro is planned to pass through the locality, and a metro station may be constructed on East Avenue. However, construction through the neighbourhood is controversial, due to its planned displacement of trees and wildlife of the Salim Ali Bird Sanctuary, alleged failure to follow due process, and the possibility of added traffic congestion. In November 2018, citizens protested construction of the Pune Metro through Kalyani Nagar.
