= Rahatani =

- Suburb
- Location in Maharashtra, India
- Coordinates: 18°36′23″N 73°47′12″E
- Country: India
- State: Maharashtra
- District: Pune district

Government
  - Type: Municipal Corporation
  - Body: Pimpri-Chinchwad Municipal Corporation

Languages
  - Official: Marathi
- Time zone: UTC+5:30 (IST)
- PIN: 411017
- Vehicle registration: MH-14
- Website: www.rahatanipune.com

Rahatani is a suburb of Pimpri-Chinchwad situated on the banks of the Pavana in Pune district. Rahatani is 7 kilometres (4.3 mi) from Hinjawadi and centered in between the suburbs of Pimple Saudagar and Kalewadi.

The locality is a developing residential area. Its proximity to the Rajiv Gandhi InfoTech Park located at Hinjawadi makes it a residential hub for people working in the Information Technology industry.

== Geography and Climate ==
Rahatani is located on relatively flat land, as is the area around it. The suburbs bordering Rahatani are Pimple Saudagar & Wakad to the south & West, Kalewadi to the north, and Thergaon to the west. Rahatani has the same climate as Pune city.

== Transport ==
Rahatani is well connected by road to the rest of the city by public transportation. The nearest airport is Pune Airport, with the Maharashtra government planning to set up a new airport near Chakan. The railway station nearest to this area is Pimpri Railway Station. Pune Mahanagar Parivahan Mahamandal Limited (PMPML) operates the public transport system in this area. The Rainbow BRTS bus system has been operational in Rahatani since November 2015. All local trains between Pune Junction railway station and Lonavala railway station stop at Pimpri railway station.

== Education ==
Some primary schools and pre-primary schools affiliated to MSBTE have been developed in this locality in the past few years. Many schools affiliated to national education boards ICSE and CBSE have been established within the area limits.

Indian cricket star Rohit Sharma inaugurated a mini cricket ground in a school in the region.

=== Schools ===
- Bhikoba Tambe Highschool
- Path-Shaala
- Pearls English Medium School
- SNBP International School

== Hospitals ==
- Metro Hospital
- B Positive Physiotherapy Clinic
- Healing Touch Hospital
- Lotus Multispeciality Hospital
- Omkar Khalane Multispeciality Hospital
- VitaLife Clinic
- Vighnaharta Hospital

== See also ==
- Aundh
- Chinchwad Assembly constituency
- Pimple Gurav
