= List of hospitals in Pune =

This is an incomplete list of hospitals and research centers in Pune, Maharashtra, India.

Name	Neighborhood/Area	Est.	Ref.
Aditya Birla Memorial Hospital	Thergaon		
Apple Hospital	Wakad		
Apollo Spectra Hospitals	Sadashiv Peth	1971	
B. J. Medical College	Pune Camp		
KEM Hospital	Somwar Peth	1912	
Bharati Hospital, Bharati Dental Hospital, Bharati Ayurveda Hospital	Katraj | Dhankawadi	1994	
Chellaram Diabetes Hospital	Bavdhan		
Cipla Palliative Care and Training Centre	Warje	1997	
Cloudnine Hospitals	Kalyaninagar	2014	
Colambia Asia Hospital Pune	Kharadi	2014	
Command Hospital (Southern Command)	Wanwadi	1869	
Deenanath Mangeshkar Hospital	Erandawne	2001	
Bibvewadi |1988 |
Global Hospital	Dattawadi	2012	
Gupte Hospital	Baner		
Hardikar Hospital	Shivaji Nagar	1971	
Inamdar Multispecialty Hospital	Fatima Nagar		
City Children Hospital	Vaishali Nagar		
Inlaks & Budhrani Hospital	Koregaon Park	1989	
Jehangir Hospital	Sassoon Road	1946	
Joshi Hospital	Shivaji Nagar	1950	
Kirath specialist	Fatima Nagar	1968	
Kotbagi Hospital	Aundh	1967	
Lifepoint Multispeciality Hospital	Wakad		
Lokmanya Hospital	Nigdi		
Medipoint Hospital	Chandan Nagar, Pune		
Pune Station |1965 |
National Institute of Ophthalmology	Shivaji Nagar	1912	
The New Life Hospitals Meera Multispeciality			
Noble Hospital	Hadapsar		
Nova IVF Fertility Center	Pune	2015	
N R S Hospital	Wakad	2018	
ONP Leela Hospitals	Shivaji Nagar	1956	
Pawar Surgical Hospital Pune	Hadapsar		
Poona Hospital	Deccan Gymkhana		
Pune Adventist Hospital			
Ranka Hospital	Mukundnagar	2000	
Raut Eye Care: Eye Hospital in Pune	Pune	1987	
Ruby Hall Clinic	Sassoon Road	1959	
Sapphire Roots - Hair Transplant, Skin and Laser Clinic	Wakad		
Sahawas Hospital	Karve Nagar	1987	
Sahyadri Hospital	Deccan Gymkhana	2011	
Saishree Hospital and Joint Replacement Centre	Aundh	2009	
Sancheti Hospital	Shivaji Nagar		
Sassoon Hospital	Pune Railway Station	1867	
Shashwat Hospital	Kothrud		
Surya Mother & Child Care Hospital	2013 |		
Urban Skin Hair Clinic	Pimple Gurav	2015	
VishwaRaj Hospital	Pune Loni Kalbhor		
Embrio IVF Center	Veerbhadra Nagar, Baner		
