= Peths in Pune =

Old city area of Pune, Maharashtra

Peth, in the Marathi language, is a general locality in the Indian city of Pune. Up to seventeen peths are located in central Pune, and were mostly established during Maratha and Peshwa rule in the 17th-19th century AD. Seven of them are named after the days of the week in Marathi: traders and craftsmen in a given locality mainly conducted business only on that day of the week.

Today the peths form the heart of Pune city, and are referred to as the old city, or simply city. They are considered to be the cultural heart of Pune.

List of Peths in Pune
| Peth name | Developed by | Established in | Named for |
|---|---|---|---|
| Kasba Peth | | Around 1300 | "Qasba" (Arabic: urban cluster) |
| Guruwar Peth | Jivajipant Khasgiwale | 1750 | Guruwar (Marathi: Thursday) |
| Somwar Peth | Dadoji Konddev | Before 1610 | Somwar (Marathi: Monday) |
| Mangalwar Peth | Dadoji Konddev | 1663 | Mangalwar (Marathi: Tuesday) |
| Shukrawar Peth | Peshwas | 1734 | Shukrawar (Marathi: Friday) |
| Raviwar Peth | Nilopant Mujumdar | Before 1610 | Raviwar (Marathi: Sunday) |
| Shaniwar Peth | Moropant Pingle | Before 1610 | Shaniwar (Marathi: Saturday) |
| Bhavani Peth | Peshwa | 1767 | Named after a temple dedicated to the Hindu goddess, Bhavani located here. |
| Ghorpade Peth | Sardar Gorpade, of Peshwas | 1781 | After himself |
| Budhwar Peth | Peshwas | 1703 | Budhwar (Marathi: Wednesday) |
| Ganesh Peth | Sakharam Bapu Bokil | 1755 | Named after the Hindu god Ganesh |
| Sadashiv Peth | Madhavrao Peshwa | 1769 | After his uncle Sadashivrao Peshwa |
| Narayan Peth | Sawai Madhavrao Peshwa | 1761 | After his Father |
| Rasta Peth | Sardar Raste | 1783 | After himself |
| Nana Peth | Madhavrao Peshwa | 1789 | After Nana Phadnavis |
| Mahatma Phule Peth (formerly known as Ganj Peth) | British administration | 1789 | After Mahatma Phule |
| Navi Sadashiv Peth or simply, Navi Peth | British administration | | Navi (Marathi: New) |

== See also ==
- List of neighbourhoods in Pune
- Pune
