= Sangvi, Pune =

Sangvi
- Neighbourhood
- Interactive map of Sangvi
- Country: India
- State: Maharashtra

Languages
  - Official: Marathi
- Time zone: UTC+5:30 (IST)
- PIN: 411027
- Vehicle registration: MH - 14
- Civic agency: Pimpri Chinchwad Municipal Corporation, Pune

Sangvi is a locality in the city of Pune, India. The locality is divided into two - Old (Juni) Sangvi and New (Navi) Sangvi.

Some of the nearby areas include Pimple Gurav, Pimple Nilakh, Pimple Saudagar, Aundh, Dapodi, Bopodi, Khadki, Wakad, Hinjawadi, University of Pune.
