= Aundh, Pune =

Suburb of Pune city in Maharashtra, India

Coordinates: 18°31′20.68″N 73°50′54.94″E

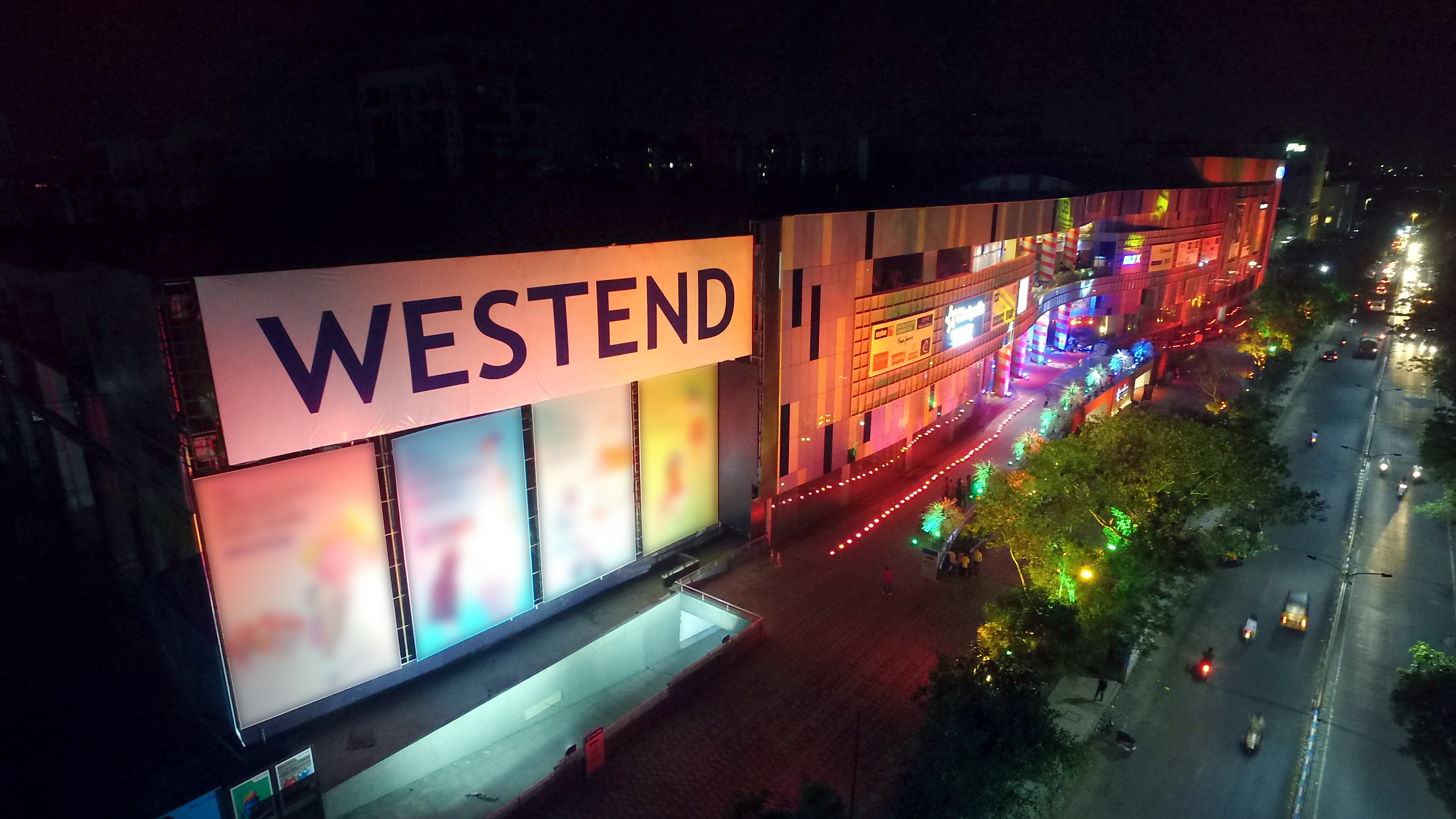
Westend Mall, Aundh

Aundh is an upscale, affluent neighbourhood in the city of Pune, India. Since its inception in the mid-1990s, Aundh has developed significantly as a residential area with proximity to the University of Pune.

== History ==
Aundh was a village where the Battle of Khadki took place in 1817. Today, the area has become one of the best and up-market areas in the city.

The residential real-estate prices in this area have seen a huge uptrend which has been largely driven by the demand coming from IT professionals as well as migrants from various parts of the country. Its proximity to the Mumbai-Pune express way and connectivity to Shivaji Nagar, makes it preferable to reside there than other parts of the city. Aundh also has become famous for various modern and innovative places of recreation and indulgence, such as the presence of a gourmet food store - Fine foods, gymnasiums - Golds Gym, Air, and a 3 star hotel - Seasons. Aundh is a popular hangout destination for the cosmopolitan crowd of Pune. The area is also a major hub for business as there are many companies, high end showrooms, high end health clubs and recreational outlets.

The Westend Mall near Parihar Chowk is developed in 2016 by Suma Shilp on a 67,500 sq.m. (17 acres) plot with 250 Key 5 Star Hilton Hotel, Shoppers Stop, and Cinepolis 8 Screen Multiplex with Pune's first IMAX theatre, one of the major malls in Pune.

Due to its proximity to schools in and surrounding the area, Aundh has activity centers for children of various age groups. The area has developed into a self-sustained locality similar to other suburban areas nationwide. Aundh serves as a residential area in Pune, while Koregaon Park functions as a commercial area. The location features high real estate prices and attracts residents from different states and countries due to its local services and amenities.

== Developmental activities ==
Road from Parihar Chowk to Breman Chowk is currently been redesigned as a part of Smart City Pune project. The layout of road will mainly address traffic problem during peak hours and parking problems. Moreover, the layout has well designed space for pedestrians, a cycling track and sitting arrangements around trees, wi-fi, vertical garden etc. and has met the international standards.

== Sub-areas ==
Aundh can be divided into the old Aundhgaon and the newly constructed suburban areas. The suburb encompasses the areas along the University road, after Governor house, up to Rajiv Gandhi Bridge on River Mula, across which is Sangvi (and the Aundh Chest Hospital) in one direction and Spicer college region to Baner in the opposite direction.

== Hospitals ==
- Shashwat Hospital
- Disha Diagnostics Center
- Sanjivani Medipoint Hospital
- Dr Kothari's Dental Privil
- The Inamdar Heart Clinic
- Shreyas Hospital
- Acme Dental Lounge
- Shraddha Hospital
- Mann clinic
- Latkar Clinic
- Aundh Kuti Hospital
- Geeta's Advanced Dental Clinic
- AIMS Aundh Hospital
- Ankura Hospital for Women & Children

== See also ==
- Pimple Gurav
- Pimple Saudagar
- Pimpri
- List of roads in Pune
