= Battle of Khadki =

1817 Indian colonial conflict

- Part of the Third Anglo-Maratha War
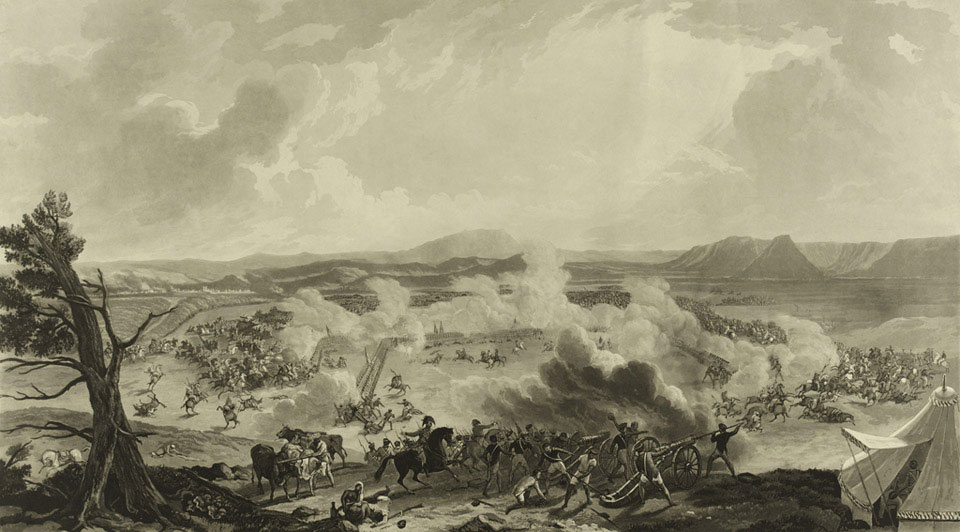
| Date | 5 November 1817 |
| Location | Khadki, India 18.564°N 73.851°E |
| Result | British victory |
| Territorial changes | Pune captured by the British |

Belligerents
| Maratha Confederacy | East India Company |

Commanders and leaders
| (Maratha Empire) Bapu Gokhale | (East India Company) Charles Barton Burr (East India Company) John Ford |

Strength
| 28,000 | 3,000 |

Casualties and losses
| 500 | 68 |
- Location within Maharashtra Khadki (India)

The Battle of Khadki, also known as or the Battle of Ganeshkhind and Battle of Kirkee, took place at modern day Khadki, India, on 5 November 1817 between the forces of the British East India Company and the Maratha Confederacy under the leadership of Appasaheb Bhonsle. The forces of the East India Company achieved a decisive victory, with Khadki later becoming a military cantonment under British rule.

== Prelude ==
=== Maratha Confederacy in decline ===
The Second Anglo-Maratha War proved disastrous for the Maratha Confederacy. Due to titular figureheads that were Chhatrapati and Peshwa, the Maratha Sardars took advantage of the reduced strength and command of the Chhatrapatis and Peshwas over Maharashtra and the Maratha Confederacy started to decline. The Confederacy was in very high debt due to battles and governance, and was not receiving any income from taxes, since the Sardars were corrupt and were keeping the money to themselves. Mahadaji Shinde did restore the Maratha authority in Northern India with the help of his cavalry, French-trained gunners, and artillery. Mahadji comprehensively defeated the British forces in the First Anglo-Maratha War, but after his death in 1794, the Maratha Sardars weren't capable of fighting off the British. Though leaders like Mudhoji II Bhonsle and Daulat Rao Sindhia did put up a valiant effort. But after the death of Mahadaji Shinde, the Maratha confederacy had fallen into a state of constant decline.

== Armies ==
The Maratha army consisted of Huzurat or Sarkari Fauz and had the following Generals when the battle began: Bapu Gokhale, assisted by Anandrao Babar, Vithalrao Vinchurkar, assisted by Rajwade, Govindrao Ghorpade Mudholkar, Tryambakrao Rethrekar, Shaikh Miraj, Dafle, Bahirji Shitole-Deshmukh, Mor Dixit, assisted by Sardar Kokare, Sardar Appa Desai Nipankar, assisted by Sardar Pandhare, Sardar Naropant Apte, Sardar Yashwantrao Ghorpade Sondurkar, Sardar Wamanrao Raaste, Sardar Chintamanrao Patwardhan, assisted by Bapu Narayan Bhave Ramdurgkar, Sardar Mutalik on behalf of Pant Pratinidhi, Sardar Naik Anjurkar, Sardar Purandare, and Sardar Nagarkar, assisted by Moreshwar Kanitkar, Sardar Raghoji Salve. All these sardars (the equivalent of Earls or Dukes) had both cavalry and infantry. The army's Artillery was led by Laxmanrao Panshe and his nephew.

The East India Company's force here was led by Lieutenant Colonel Charles Barton Burr, 7th Regiment Native Infantry, who marched to Khadki on 1 November, and Captain John Ford, Dapooree Battalion, who marched towards on 4 November.

Bapu Gokhale commanded a total force of 28,000 men (20,000 horse and 8,000 infantry) with 20 guns. The British force numbered only 3,000, of whom 2,000 were cavalry and 1,000 infantry, with 8 guns.

== Battle ==
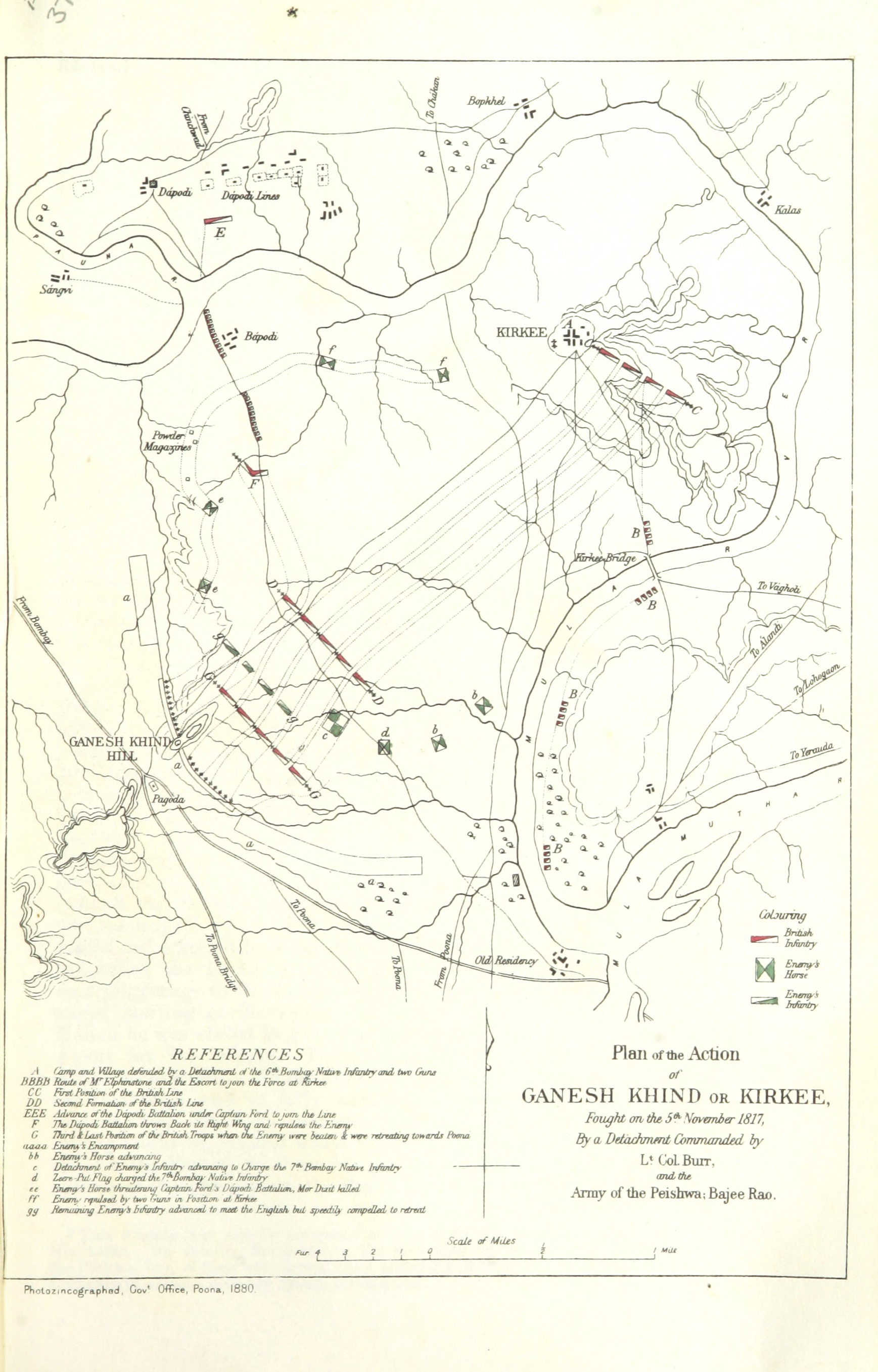
Plan of the action (Note: The temple indicated as "Pagoda" in the map above is not the Chatushshrungi temple as earlier thought. At the location there exists a Ganesh temple named "Paarvatinandan" which is known to have been regularly visited by the Peshwas before their campaigns. Diplomatic correspondence between the Peshwa and Mountstuart Elphinstone days before the battle refer to a "pooja" (worship programme) intended to be performed by the Peshwa at a local temple justifying the troop build up around Ganeshkhind.)

A detachment commanded by Burr advanced from Dapodi village near the confluence of Pavana and Mula rivers. His detachment was placed in Pune for the protection of the Peshwa. Before the battle, the Peshwa's commander, Moropant Dixit, had tried to bring Captain Ford onto his side, but these overtures were refused. (Note: There is an account of the battle from the "Peshwyaanchee Bakhar", the official record of the reign of the Peshwas. It was written in the Modi script (translations are available) but does not include maps. The fact that the "Zaree Pat" staff broke prior to the battle has been recorded here, that being perceived as a bad omen. There is also a mention of the morass which obstructed the cavalry charge and that the Peshwa watched the battle unfolding from Parvati Hill with the help of a telescope.)

First, Vinchurkar's gun infantry targeted the British Resident Elphinstone's house by firing from the other side of the river. After he left, Kokare's cavalry burned all the bungalows of the British in the vicinity. The residency was left and was at once sacked and burned, and Mr. Elphinstone retired to join the troops at Khadki. A message to advance was sent to Colonel Burr who moved towards Dapodi to meet Captain Ford's corps; the corps united and together pushed on to the attack. Amazed by the advance of troops whom they believed had been bribed or panic-struck, the Maratha skirmishers fell back, and the Maratha army, already anxious from the ill-omened breaking of their standard, began to lose heart. Gokhale rode from rank to rank cheering and taunting, and opened the attack pushing forward his cavalry so as to nearly to surround the British. In their eagerness to attack a Portuguese battalion, which had come up under cover to enclosures, some of the English sepoys became separated from the rest of the line. Gokhale seized the opportunity for a charge with 6000 chosen horsemen. Colonel Burr who saw the movement, recalled his men and ordered them to stand firm and keep their fire. The cavalry charge proved ineffectual. The charge was broken by a deep morass in front of the English. As the horsemen floundered in disorder, the British troops fired on them with deadly effect. Only a few of the Maratha horses pressed on to the bayonets; the rest retreated or fled. The failure of their great cavalry charge disconcerted the Marathas. They began to drive off their guns, the infantry retired, and, on the advance of the British line, the field was cleared. The next morning, the arrival of the light battalion and auxiliary horse from Sirur prevented Gokhale from renewing the attack. The European loss was sixty-eight and the Maratha loss was 500 killed and wounded.

== Aftermath ==
A few battles were later fought against the Bhosale faction at Sitabuldi in Nagpur and against the Pindaris. The Peshwa, the chief executive of the Maratha Confederacy, was militarily defeated in the Battle near Asirgarh. The next skirmish occurred after 5 November at Yerwada where Sardar Yashwant Ghorpade's forces were lured away by the British by bribing. This paved the way for battalions coming from Ghodnadi and Jalna and gunners of Panshes artillery to join the British, resulting in the Peshwa fleeing Pune. The East India Company took over the Shaniwar Wada, the seat of the Peshwa, on 17 November 1817. By 1818, the Peshwa had surrendered to the East India Company.

== The battlefield today ==
After the battle, the East India Company troops crossed the river at a place called Yelloura ford, whose precise location is still unidentified. It is speculated that the place was probably where the bund of Bund Garden exists today. "Yelloura" is perhaps a corruption of Yerwada of today. This corroborates well with the mention of a nearby hill in Valentine Blacker's account. Also, the morass which played a crucial role in the battle is unidentified as of today. (Note: The morass which caused the Maratha cavalry charge to break is likely to have survived till today. Results of field work being carried out presently will be reported shortly to Bharat Itihas Sanshodhak Mandal, Pune, India.) It is expected to have existed in the Range Hills Colony, the Military Station Depot of Khadki or near the Symbiosis Institute of Management or towards the College of Agriculture, Pune. Another meaning of word "morass" is "a complicated or confused situation", so perhaps it does not refer to a physical feature. It may just describe the result of the charge. An account of the battle by James Grant Duff is well known to historians. Duff observed the battle from a position on the hills of Bhamburda. This location is likely to have been on the hill that faces behind the present-day Hanuman Nagar or Pandav Nagar.
