= Pimpri-Chinchwad Municipal Corporation =

Local governing body of Pimpri-Chinchwad

Pimpri Chinchwad Municipal Corporation Pimparī Cin̄cavaḍa Mahānagarapālikā
- Emblem of Pimpri Chinchwad Municipal Corporation

Type
- Type: Municipal Corporation

History
- Founded: 11 October 1982
- Preceded by: Pimpri Chinchwad Municipal Council, Pune (1970-1982)

Leadership
- Municipal Commissioner & Administrator: Dr. Vijay Suryawanshi, IAS
- Mayor: Ravi Landge, Bharatiya Janata Party
- Deputy Mayor: Sharmila Babar, Bharatiya Janata Party

Structure
- Seats: 128
- Political groups: Government (84): BJP (84); Opposition (44): NCP (37); SHS (6); IND (1)
- Committees: Standing Committee; Law Committee; Women and Child welfare Committee; City improvement Committee; Sports, Art, literature and cultural committee; Biodiversity Committee; Ward Committees (A to H)

Elections
- Voting system: First-past-the-post voting
- Last election: 15 January 2026
- Next election: 2031

Motto
- Prepared for public interest

Meeting place
- PCMC Bhavan, Pimpri, Pune

Website
- www.pcmcindia.gov.in

Pimpri Chinchwad Municipal Corporation (PCMC) is the civic body that governs the city of Pimpri-Chinchwad, from state of Maharashtra, was established on 11 October 1982. It governs an area of 181 km^{2} with a population of 1.72 million. The executive power of the PCMC is vested in the Municipal Commissioner, an Indian Administrative Service (IAS) officer appointed by the Government of Maharashtra. The position is held by Shekhar Singh (IAS) during the pandemic in late December 2020. The general body of the PCMC consists of 128 directly elected councilors, popularly known as "corporators", headed by a mayor. Rahul Jadhav (BJP) was elected as the mayor and Sachin Chinchwade (BJP) as the deputy mayor in August 2018. The PCMC headquarters is situated in Pimpri on the Old Pune-Mumbai Highway.

== History ==
The industrialization in what is today the areas of Pune's Pimpri Chinchwad Municipal Corporation began in 1954 with the establishment of Hindustan Antibiotics, the first pharmaceutical company of the Government of India. On 4 March 1970, Annasaheb Magar laid the foundation stone of the Pimpri Chinchwad Municipal Council, which brought the industrial and residential areas of Pimpri, Chinchwad, Akurdi and Bhosari under a unified civic body. Pimpri Chinchwad Municipal Corporation is popularly known as PCMC, it is also one of the best planned city in India. In 1975, the status of the Municipal Council was changed from C to A class. On 11 October 1982, the civic body was reorganized to form the modern municipal corporation with the merger of seven surrounding villages of Sangvi, Rahatani, Thergaon, Pimple Gurav, Pimple Nilakh, Pimple Saudagar as well as parts of Wakad. The newly formed PCMC had an area of 86 km^{2} under its jurisdiction, which increased drastically in September 1997 after 18 fringe villages were merged into the city. Today the city has an area of 181 km^{2}.

== Administration ==
The major responsibility of PCMC is to look after the civic and infrastructural needs of the citizens. The administration consists of two major branches: the executive branch headed by the Municipal Commissioner and the deliberative branch headed by the Mayor. The PCMC Police is the law enforcement agency for the neighbourhood along with its historic Pune and answers to the Ministry of Home Affairs of the GoM. It is headed by a Police Commissioner, an Indian Police Service (IPS) officer. A separate police commissionerate was announced for PCMC, Pune in April 2018 to be carved out of Pune City Police.

=== Executive Branch ===
The executive branch is headed by the Municipal Commissioner appointed by the State government from the Indian Administrative Service for a term not exceeding three years according to Section 36 of the Maharashtra Municipal Corporation Act, 1949. The Municipal Commissioner also serves on the boards of directors of the two public transport companies, PMPML and MahaMetro.

==== Administrative Zones ====
The city is divided into eight administrative zones (named A to H). Each zone consists of 4 electoral wards and has an office (Marathi: क्षेत्रिय कार्यालय, IAST: Kṣhetriya Kāryālay) overseen by an Assistant Municipal Commissioner.

=== Deliberative Branch ===
The deliberative branch is the elected branch of the PCMC headed by the Mayor. The city is divided into 32 electoral wards (Marathi: प्रभाग, IAST: Prabhāg), represented by 4 corporators each. Thus, the general body of the PCMC consists of 128 corporators. They are elected for a five-year term by adult franchise in municipal elections. All major political parties active in the state contest the elections.

The corporators elect the Mayor, a ceremonial position with limited duties who acts as an ambassador and representative of the city, as well as a Deputy Mayor. The corporators approve the city budget and act as watchdogs on implementation of policy by the staff under the Municipal Commissioner.

== Revenue sources ==
The following are the Income sources for the corporation from the Central and State Government.

=== Revenue from taxes ===
Following is the Tax related revenue for the corporation.

- Property tax.
- Profession tax.
- Entertainment tax.
- Grants from Central and State Government like Goods and Services Tax.
- Advertisement tax.

=== Revenue from non-tax sources ===
Following is the Non Tax related revenue for the corporation.

- Water usage charges.
- Fees from Documentation services.
- Rent received from municipal property.
- Funds from municipal bonds.

==== Committees ====
The corporators form several committees which deliberate on various issues. At present, PCMC has the following subject committees: Law, Women and Child welfare, City improvement, Biodiversity and a committee for Sports, Art, Literature and Culture. The Standing Committee is the perhaps the most important committee of the PCMC formed according to Section 20 of Maharashtra Municipal Corporation Act, 1949. It consists of 16 members headed by a President appointed at the first meeting of the newly elected Corporation, half of whom retire every succeeding year. A new president is also appointed every year. Besides the subject committees and the Standing Committee, there are eight ward committees representing each of the eight administrative zones (A to H) of the city.

City Officials
Title	Incumbent	Since	Appointed/Elected
Municipal Commissioner & Administrator	Rajesh Patil	2021	Appointed by the GoM
Commissioner of Police	Ankush Shinde	April 2022	Appointed by the GoM
Mayor	Ravi Landge		Elected
Deputy Mayor			Elected
Leader of the House	Vacant		Elected
President of the Standing Committee	Vacant		Elected

== List of Mayor ==
Dnyaneshwar Pandurang Landge was the First Mayor of Pimpri Chinchwad Municipal Corporation in the Year 1986. Later in 1990 he got elected as the MLA of Haveli Taluka and represented the area of Haveli Taluka including Pimpri Chinchwad City Effectively.

== List of Deputy Mayor ==
Hanumantrao Bhosale was the First Deputy Mayor of Pimpri Chinchwad Municipal Corporation in the Year 1986.

== Municipal elections ==
Municipal Election Summary
S.No.	Party name	Party flag or symbol	Coalition	Number of Corporators		
S.No.	Party name	Party flag or symbol	Coalition	2012	2017	2026
1	Bharatiya Janata Party (BJP)		NDA	03	77	84
2	Shiv Sena		NDA	14	09	06
3	Nationalist Congress Party (NCP)		UPA	83	36	37
4	Indian National Congress (Congress)		UPA	14	00	0
5	Maharashtra Navnirman Sena (MNS)		-	04	01	0
6	Independents		-	10	05	01
Total				128	128	128

The 2017 municipal elections were held on 21 February. For the first time in the history of PCMC, BJP emerged with an absolute majority with 77 seats. The newly elected general body elected Nitin Kalje (BJP) as the mayor and Shailaja More (BJP) in March 2017. Kalje and More resigned on 24 July 2018 citing personal reasons. The resignations came as a part of BJP's 15-month mayorship policy to allow leadership positions to other corporators. On 4 August 2018, Rahul Jadhav and Sachin Chinchwade of the BJP were respectively elected as the mayor and deputy mayor.

== See also ==
- Pimpri-Chinchwad
- Pune Metropolitan Region
- Pune District
- Maharashtra
