= Raviwar Peth, Pune =

Locality (peth) in Pune, Maharashtra

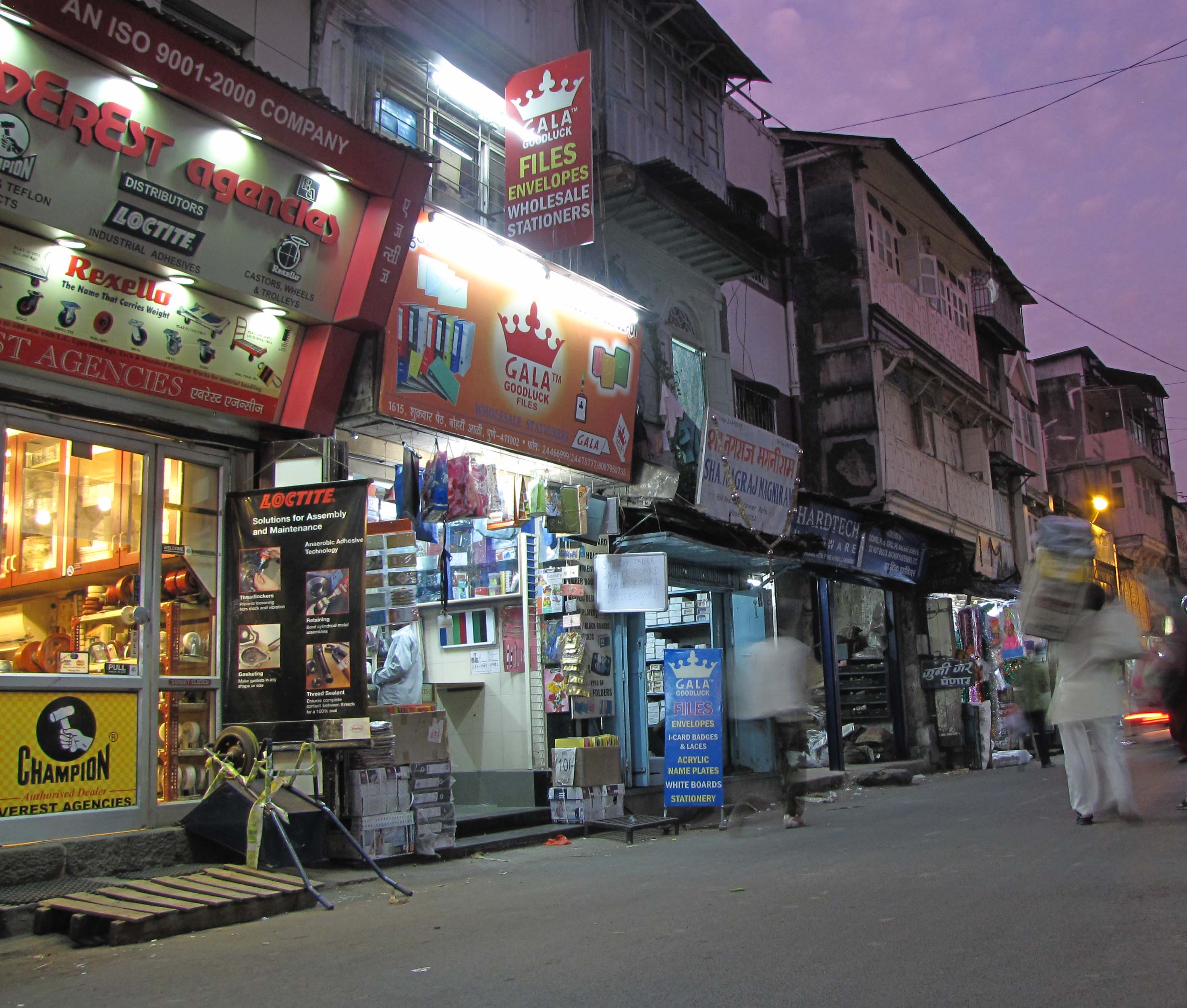
Ravivar peth in Pune

Raviwar Peth is one of the Peths in the city of Pune, India. The ancient name of this place was Malkapur. This area was developed by Nilopant Mujumdar in 1670. It was an important business center for merchants, bankers and jewelers, who also resided here. At its peak in the 1790s, the peth was the richest and thickly populated with about 1500 houses. Bohri merchants, who specialised in tin and iron, also settled here when they were invited by the government.

Raviwar Peth is famous for shops of Gold and Silver ornaments and for its plastic products market. This area also has a wholesale textile market, well known in Pune. Raviwar Peth has various cinema halls like Alpana, Vikas, Prabhat, Shree Krishna and Apollo. It is bordered by Budhwar Peth, Shukrawar Peth, Rasta Peth and Kasba Peth.
