= Dapodi =

- Suburb
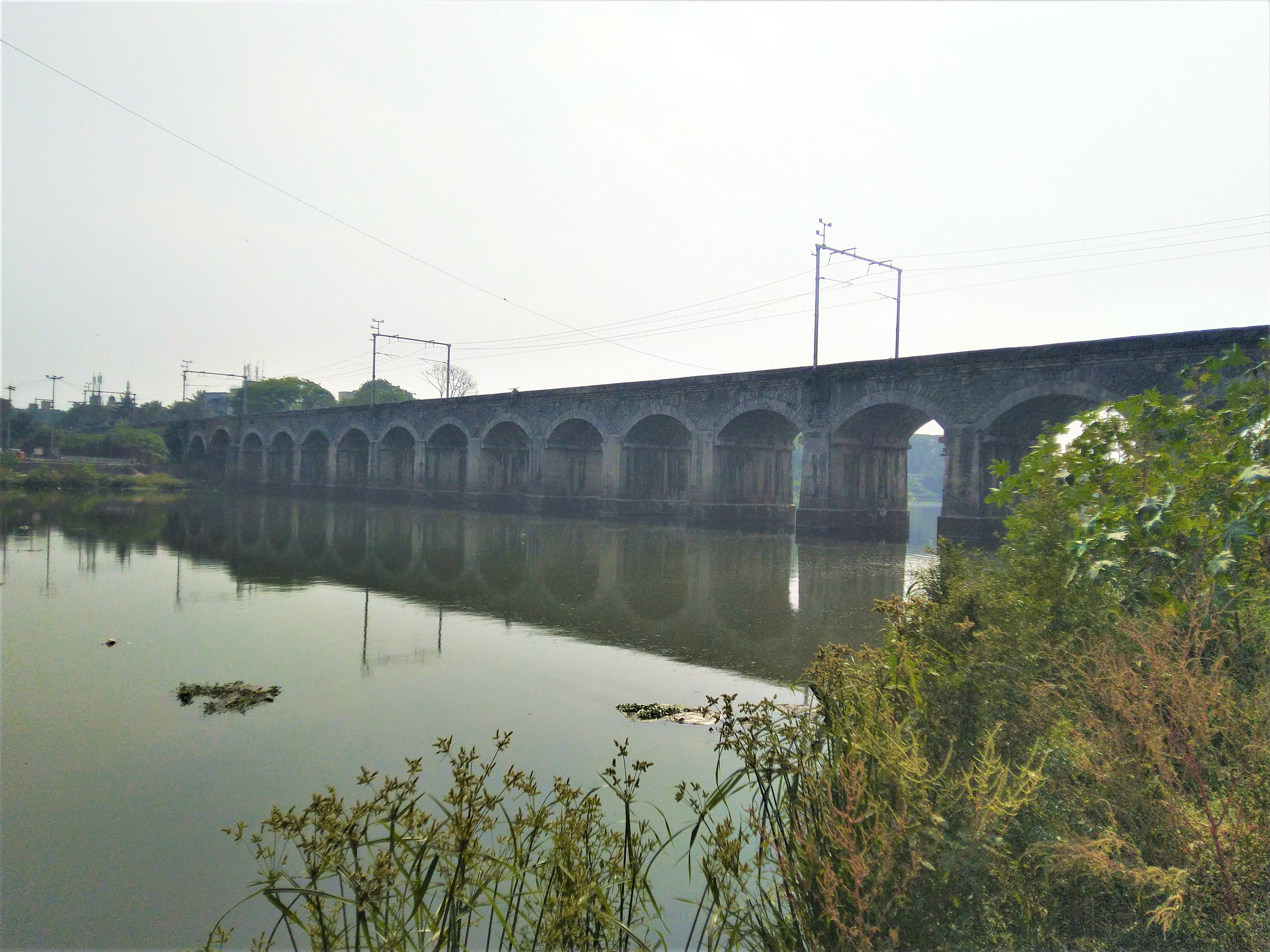
- Dapodi railway bridge

- Location in Maharashtra, India
- Coordinates: 18.581437°N 73.830421°E
- Country: India
- State: Maharashtra
- City: Pune

Languages
  - Official: Marathi, Hindi & English
- Time zone: UTC+5:30 (IST)
- PIN: 411012
- Vehicle registration: MH 14
- Civic agency: PCMC

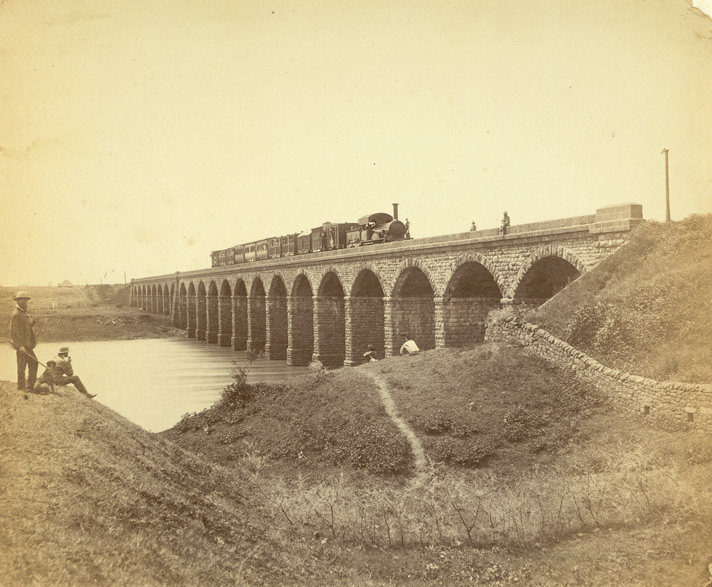
Dapoorie railway bridge in 1858.

Dapodi (earlier: Dapoorie) is a neighbourhood in Pimpri Chinchwad in the northwestern Pune, India. It is located in the northwest area of the city. Dapodi is situated on the banks of Pavana river and Mula River. The neighbourhood of Dapodi compromises of Dapodi gaon, Dapodi bazar, Pimpale Gurav, Phugewadi, Kundan Nagar and Ganesh Nagar.

The neighbourhood lies on National Highway 48 (India). It is served by Dapodi railway station which falls on Mumbai–Chennai line. The railway station opened in 1858.

The College of Military Engineering, Pune is located here.

Dapodi is surrounded by Sangvi and Pimple Gurav to the west, Bopkhel, Kalas to the east, Kasarwadi to the north, and Bopodi and Khadki to the south. The Pavana River is to the west whereas Mula river is to the south.

== Etymology ==
Dapodi was called Darpapudika (Sanskrit: दर्पपूडिका) during the Rashtrakuta rule in the 8th century. An early reference is found in a copperplate inscription dated 758 CE, describing a land gift by Rashtrakuta king Krishna I to Pugadibhatta, a brahmin. The inscription mentions the land to be the village of Bopkhelugram (Bopkhel), bordered by Darpapudika (Dapodi) to the west, Bhesuri (Bhosari) to the north, the Muila (Mula) river to the south, and Kalas to the east.
