= Peter Hatch =

Peter Hatch is the name of:

- Peter Hatch (cricketer), English cricketer
- Peter Hatch (footballer), English footballer
- Peter Hatch (government official), American government official
