= Kalewadi =

Neighborhood in Maharashtra, India

Kalewadi is a suburb of Pune in the Indian state of Maharashtra. Kalewadi mainly consists of the following areas: Nadhe Nagar, Vijay Nagar, Jyotiba Nagar, Kokane Nagar, Pavana Nagar, and Tapkir Nagar and Aliwadi, Melvinwadi and Libinnewadi.

== Transport ==
It is about 15 km from Pune metro Station. Kalewadi is connected to Pimpri by Pavna bridge, to Chinchwad via Hedgewar Bridge, to Wakad via Kalewadi phata, and to Rahatani.

== Culture ==
People at Kalewadi celebrate the Bull festival "Pola," Navratra mahotsav, Ganapati, and Chatrapati Shivaji Maharaj Jayanti. Farmers who originally belonged to Kalewadi include Nadhe, Kale, Kokane, Tapkir and Nakhate. Nadhe constitute the majority of the farmer community. The village celebrates annual fair of Peer.

== Education ==
- Nirmal Bethany High School, Vijay Nagar, Kalewadi.
- Parvati English Medium High School.
- EuroSchool Wakad
- Om Saint High School
- Kalewadi PCMC Primary School
- M.M. Secondary School Kalewadi
- SMT. Laxmibai Tapkir Secondary School
- Alphonsa High School, Vijay Nagar, Kalewadi.
- Rodger's School
- Baby's English high school
- M.M Polytechnic

== Temples ==
- Hanuman mandir Near NadhePatil Residence.
- Durga Mata Mandir
- Radha Krishna Temple
- Ayyapa Mandir
- Jain Mandir
- Dhangarbaba Mandir
- ST. Alphonsa Church, Vijay Nagar, Kalewadi.
- Panch Peer Chowk Main Road of kalewadi
- St. Mary's Orthodox Church, Kalewadi

== See also ==
- Chinchwad
- Wakad
- Pimpri
