= Navi Peth =

Navi Peth is a generic name for a locality in cities in Maharashtra, India. "Navi" derives from the word "new" in Marathi. Localities called Navi Peth include:

- Navi Peth, Pune
- Navi Peth, Solapur
- Navi Peth, Madhavnagar
- Navi Peth, Karad
- Navi Peth, Ahmednagar
