= Mahatma Phule Mandai =

Mahatma Phule Mandai Lord Reay's Market
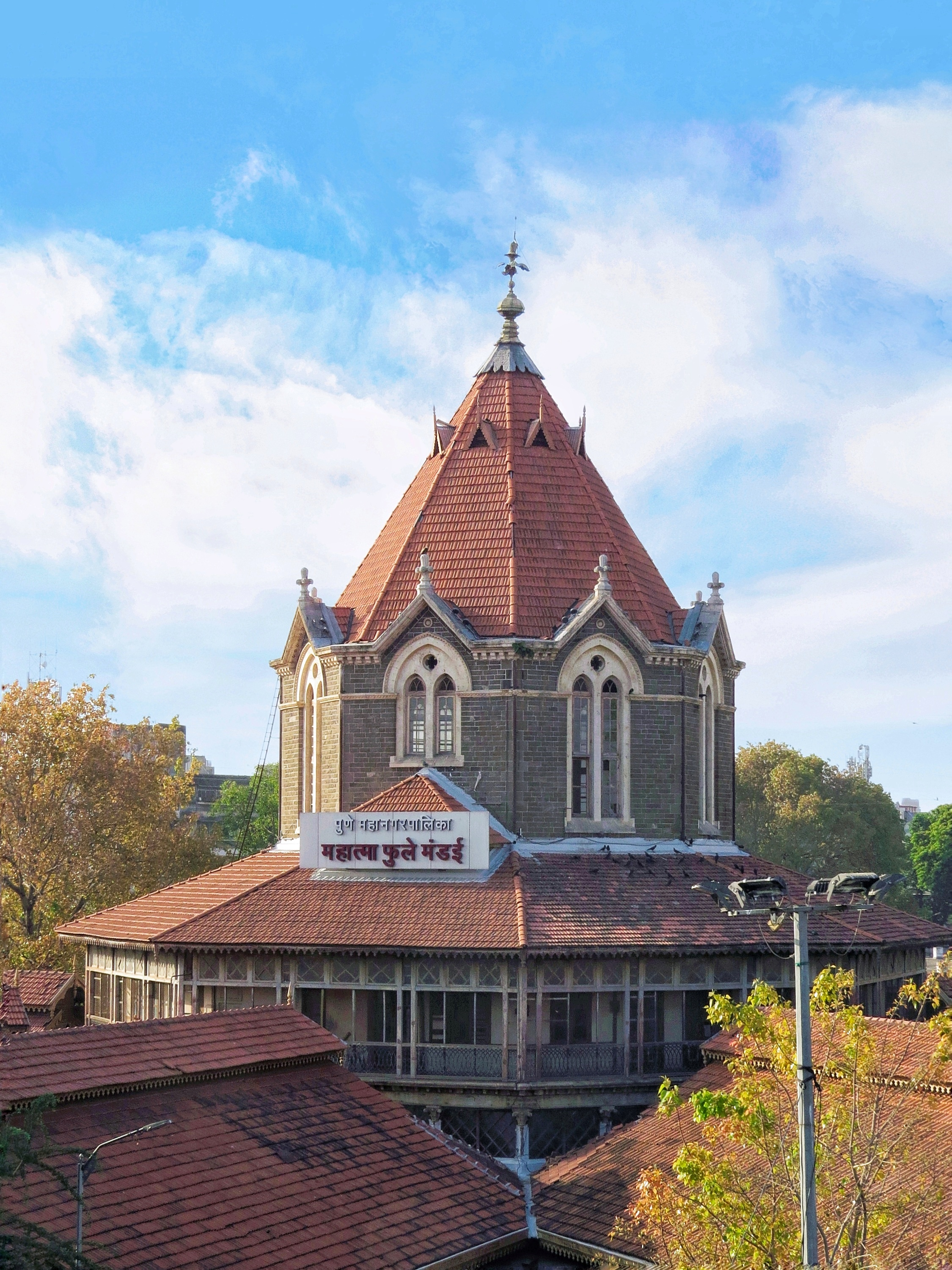
- Mahatma Phule Mandai
- Location: Shukrawar Peth, Pune, Maharashtra, India
- Coordinates: 18.512941°N 73.856298°E
- Opened: 1882
- Closed: still operational
- Owner: Pune Municipal Corporation
- Architect: Walter Ducat; Vasudev Kanitkar
- Num. of stores: 8 wings and 1 central tower
- Floor area: 46,068.67 sq ft (4,279.919 m^{2})
- Floors: 1

Mahatma Phule Mandai (formerly known as Reay Market) is the biggest retail vegetable market in the city of Pune, India. The market is housed in an iconic building from the British colonial era in the Shukrawar Peth locality in the center of the city.

== History ==
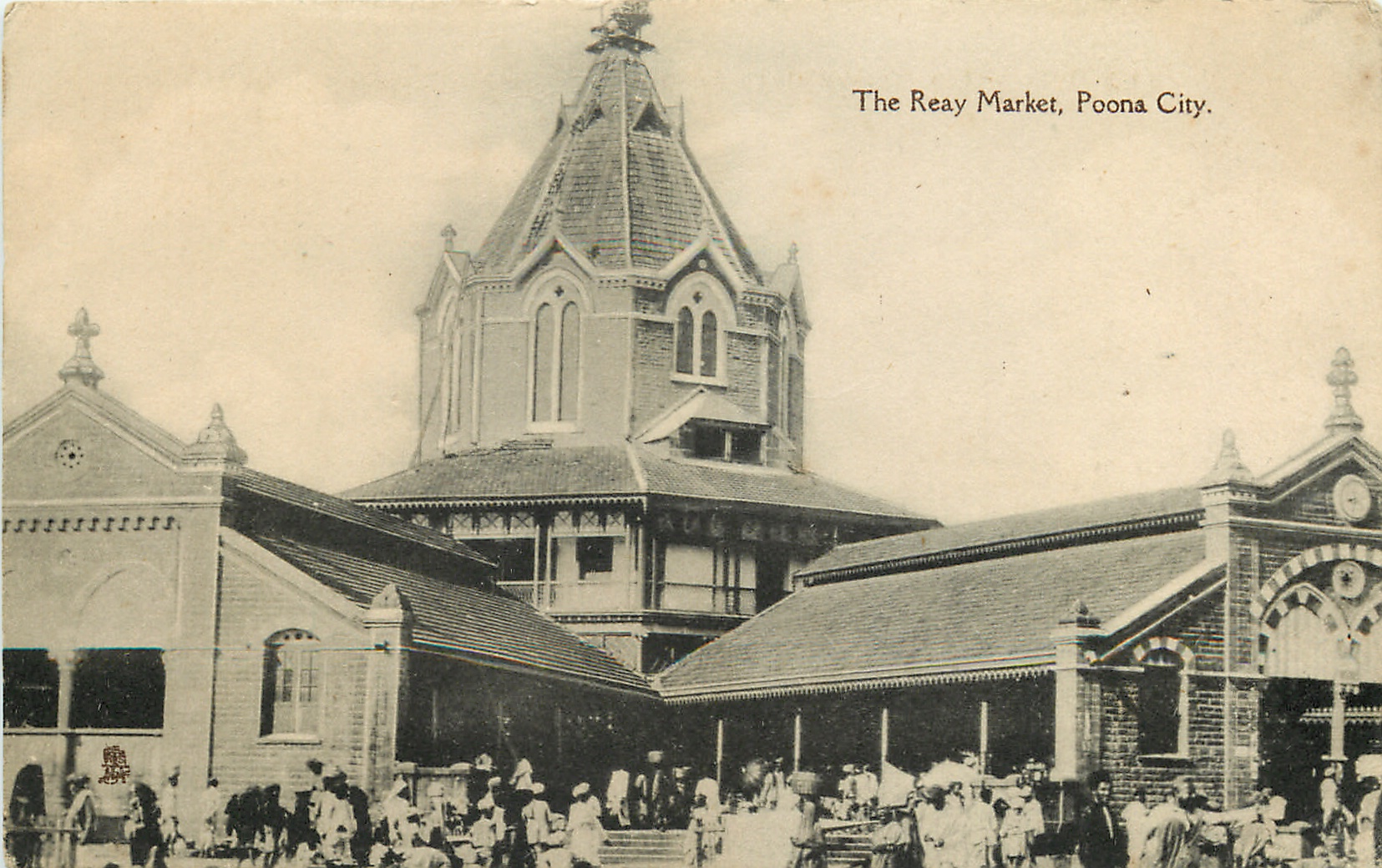
Mandai in 1900's

In the early years of the British rule an open air vegetable market used to be held outside the Shaniwar Wada. This shifted to an indoor place built by the Poona Municipality. The construction of the Gothic style building started in 1882 and took 4 years for completion. It was designed and built by Walter Ducat and Vasudeo Kanitkar with significant input from engineer Narso Ramchandra Godbole. The Market at opening was named after the then Governor of Bombay, Lord Reay, and served as a retail and wholesale market in addition to being the Municipal office. There was also an older market district called Tulshi Baug close to the vegetable market that sold a variety of household items. In 1938, when Acharya Atre was a member of the Pune Municipal Corporation, he renamed this market as Mahatma Phule Mandai to honour social reformer Jyotirao Phule, who lived nearby. The wholesale market was moved from Mandai to the outskirts of Pune in the late 1970s to the newly built Shri Chhatrapati Shivaji Market Yard at Gultekdi. The Municipal offices moved to a purpose built new building in the Shivajinagar area of the city many decades ago.

== The building ==
The market building is designed in the Gothic style. The builders used masonry carved from the local grey stone. The structure is dominated by an 80 feet central, squat, octagonal tower. The tower is surrounded by a verandah with a tiled roof. This covers the ground and first floor. Four market wings housing the majority of the stalls radiate out from the ground floor verandah. The market is entered via gothic arches located at the ends of each of the wings.

== The market today ==
Today the market has about 526 stalls of fruits and vegetables. It is always crowded because fruits and vegetable are available at lower cost than other places in the city, but is most crowded on weekends and holidays. The market has its own Ganesh Mandal for Ganesh Festival and is one of the oldest in Pune and Maharashtra. The underground Mandai metro station of the Pune Metro Purple line next to the market opened in 2024 and was renamed into Mahatma Phule Mandai metro station in December 2025.

== Akhil Mandai Ganapati ==
This is the name of Mandai's Ganesh Mandal. This is one of the oldest Ganesh Mandal in Pune.The mandai Ganpati is a popular place to visit during the annual Ganesh Festival for local Hindu residents as well as out of town visitors. It has an idol of Lord Ganesh sitting on a swing with Goddess Sharada.
