= Mula River (India) =

River in India

Coordinates: 18.53137°N 73.86019°E

Mula
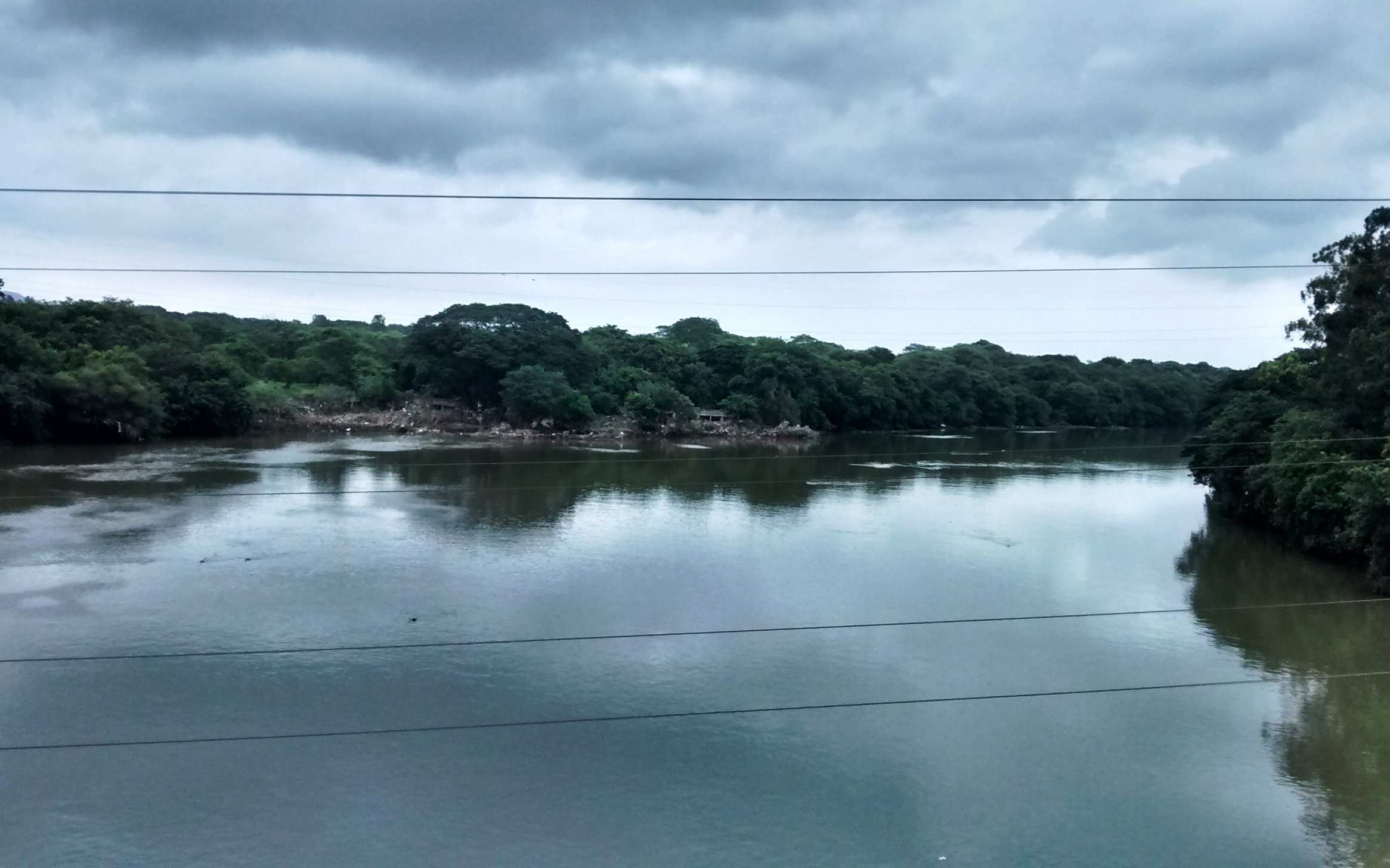
- Mula River as viewed from Harris Bridge

Location
- Country: India
- State: Maharashtra
- Region: Deccan Plateau
- District: Pune
- Cities: Pimpri-Chinchwad, Pune

Physical characteristics
- Source: Devghar taluka
  - location: Near Aamby Valley, Pune District, Sahyadri, Maharashtra
- Mouth
  - location: Sangamwadi, Pune District, Pune city, Maharashtra, India
- Length: 72 km (45 mi)

Basin features
- Tributaries
  - left: Nila River, Pavana River
  - right: Devnadi, Ramnadi, Mutha River

The Mula is a river in Pune, in Maharashtra state of India. It is dammed near the Western Ghats at the Mulshi Dam that forms the Mulshi Lake. Further downstream, in Pune city, it merges with the Pawana River on the left bank and Mutha River on the right bank to form the Mula-Mutha river, which later meets the Bhima River, which in turn is a tributary of Krishna River.

The river forms the boundary between the limits of the Pimpri-Chinchwad Municipal Corporation and the Pune Municipal Corporation.The Mula flows through the center of Pune city.

== Bridges ==
There are several bridges constructed on the river, including the Rajiv Gandhi Bridge, which connecting Pune to Ravet, crossing the river at Aundh, and Harris Bridge over the Mula at Dapodi.

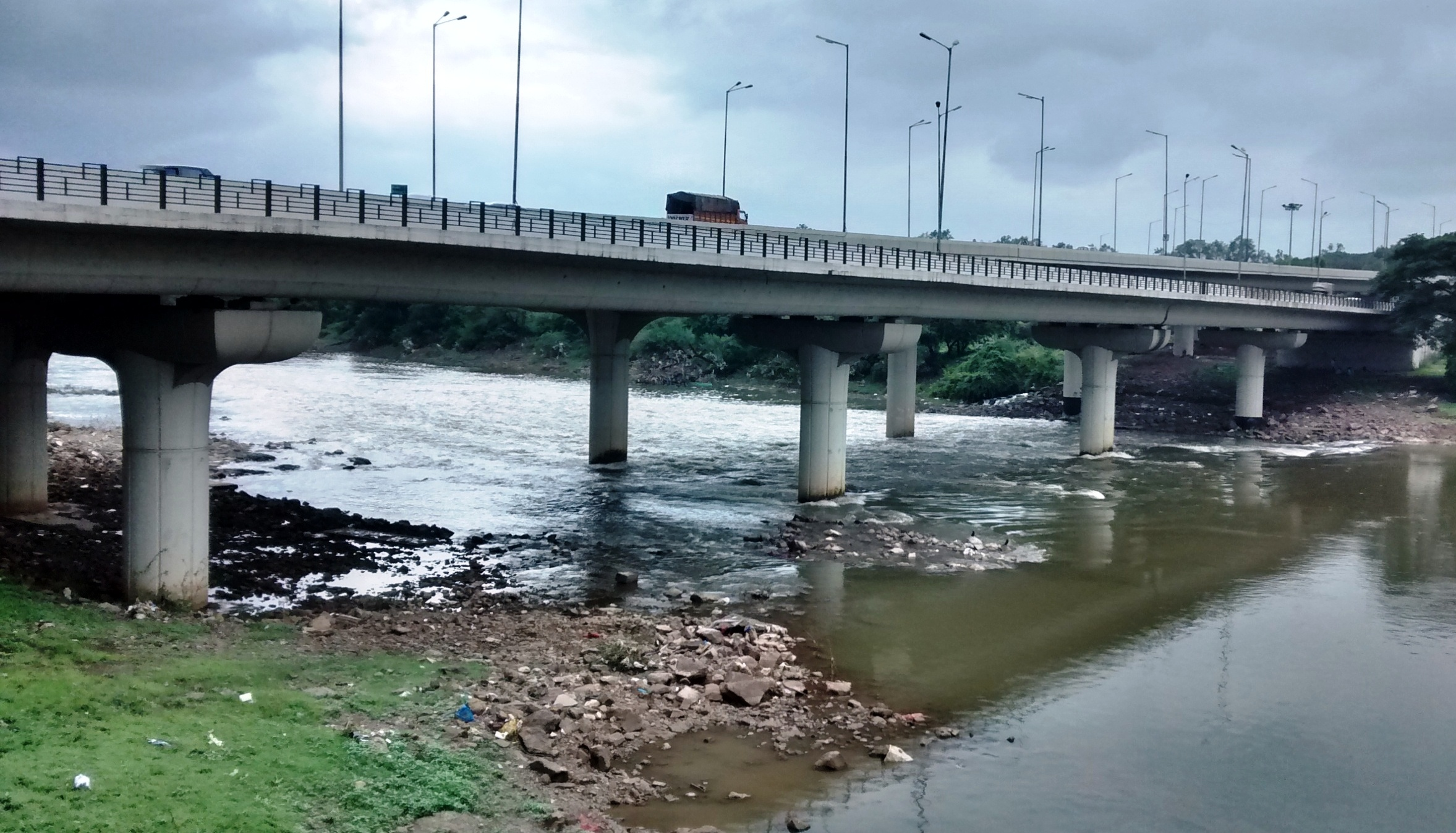
New Holkar Bridge

The Holkar Bridge crosses the river near Khadki.

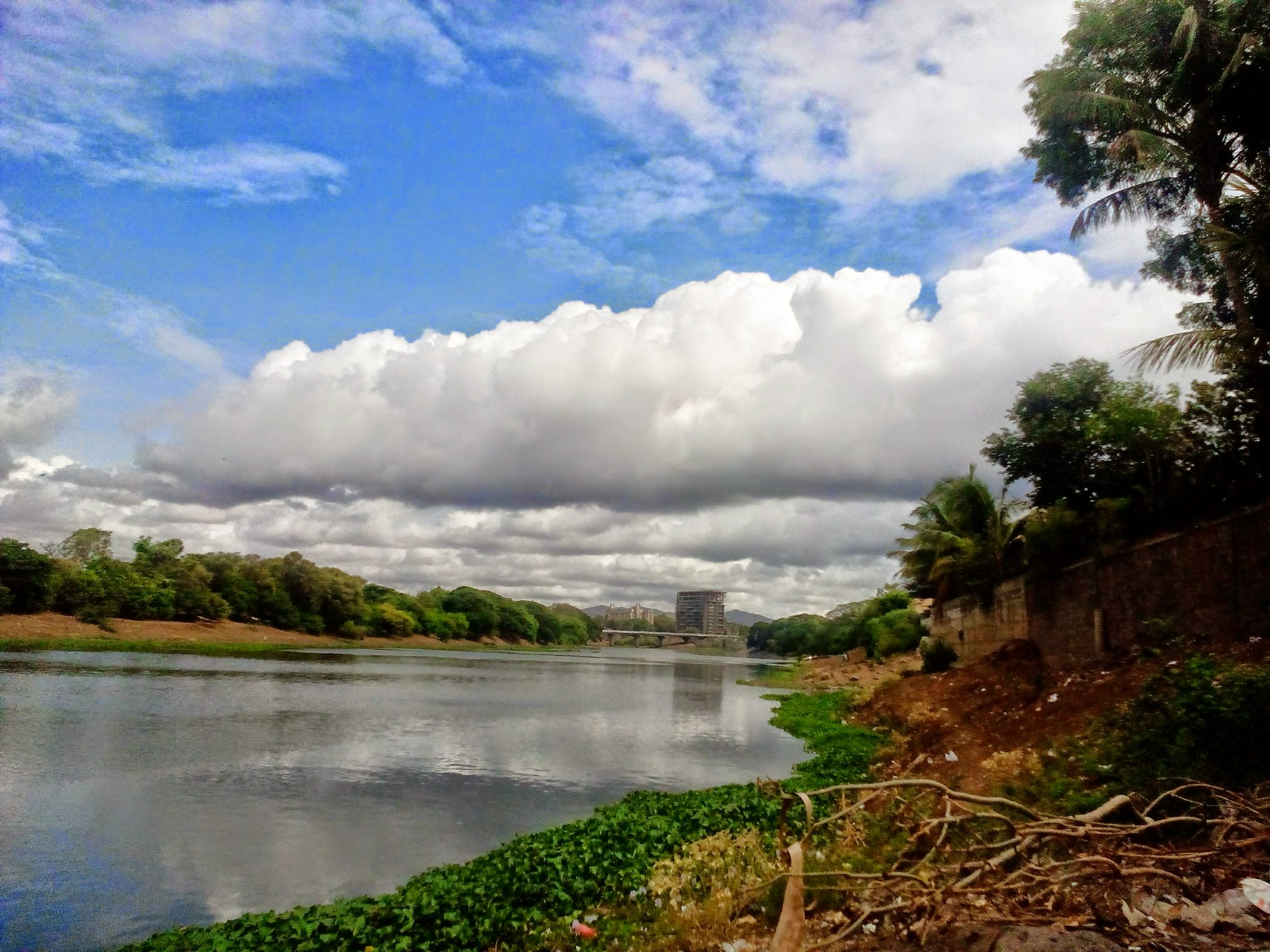
Mula River from the west bank

The Sangam Bridge crosses the Mutha River at Sangamwadi, just before their merger.

== Pollution and flooding ==
In 2010, areas surrounding the river experienced flash floods due to high levels of pollution and garbage dumped into the river.

The College of Engineering, Pune (CoEP) holds an annual boating festival at the river near its premises. In 2012, it was found that the river was not navigable from Khadki to CoEP because the Maharashtra Natural Gas Limited had obstructed the flow of the river by constructing a mud path to lay a pipeline.

In 2013, it was reported that there were dead fish in the river near Wakad. The Pimpri-Chinchwad Municipal Corporation did not determine pollution in the river as the cause.

Due to high levels of pollution, including 125 MLD of untreated sewerage water being discharged into the river by the Pune Municipal Corporation, the Maharashtra Pollution Control Board has classified the water quality to be of Class-IV.

In 2014, the Pune Police discovered that cannabis plants were being grown on the riverbed near Kharadi.
