= Pimpri-Chinchwad Bus Stand =

Bus terminal in India

Pimpri Chinchwad Bus Terminal (PCMC Bus Terminal) is the major bus depot in Vallabh Nagar area of Pimpri-Chinchwad. It operates MSRTC buses from the terminal to other towns and cities in the State of Maharashtra. This is situated on Mumbai - Pune old road between Kasarwadi and Pimpri. Buses from here operate to major towns of Dapoli, Karad, Satara etc. and major cities of Kolhapur, Sangli, Miraj, Aurangabad, Nagpur and Mumbai. This stand operates ordinary, semi-Luxury, Luxury and A/C buses.
