= CAFVD Sports Stadium =

Stadium in Khadki, Pune, India

Coordinates: 18.562582°N 73.842679°E

- Interactive map of CAFVD Sports Stadium
- Location: Khadki, Pune
- Owner: Ministry of Defence, Government of India
- Operator: Station Headquarter, Khadki/Aundh
- Capacity: 5,000

Tenants
- Khadki Blues FC; Khadki NDA Youth Club

The CAFVD Sports Stadium is a stadium in Khadki in Pune. It is located opposite Khadki railway station on old Mumbai-Pune road (Part of NH 4). Local association football and field hockey matches are played here on this stadium.

Many events of the army like annual functions are celebrated here. It is also known as an army trading area for players. It is maintained every day. and is the second biggest playground in Pune.
