= Ganesh Peth, Pune =

Coordinates: 18.517295°N 73.862028°E

Ganesh Peth is an area located in Pune City, in Maharashtra State of the Republic of India.
