= Khadki =

- Cantonment Town
- Location in Maharashtra, India
- Coordinates: 18.564°N 73.851°E
- Country: India
- State: Maharashtra
- City: Pune

Government
  - Body: Khadki Cantonment Board
- Elevation: 570 m (1,870 ft)

Population (2001)
  - Total: 76,608

Languages
  - Official: Marathi
- Time zone: UTC+5:30 (IST)
- PIN: 411003, 411020
- Vehicle registration: MH 12, MH 14
- Lok Sabha constituency: Pune (Lok Sabha constituency)
- Vidhan Sabha constituency: Shivajinagar (Vidhan Sabha constituency)
- Website: https://www.cbkhadki.org.in/

Khadki is a cantonment in the city of Pune, Maharashtra, India. It has now flourished as a quasi-metropolis & centered in the northern region of the city.

== Description ==
Khadki could be considered an Indian Army base, along with an ordnance factory consisting of two ammunition factories, a Military Vehicle Depot (Central Armed Forces Vehicle Depot, CAFVD) and the Military Dairy Farm.

Referred to previously as Kirkee during the British Raj, its borders are flanked by two other large army establishments—the College of Military Engineering at Dapodi and the Bombay Engineering Group.

It also has a war cemetery (Kirkee War Cemetery) and a war memorial. It has a large market—Khadki Bazaar—and a railway station which was connected to the Ammunition Factory, but the link to which was shut down in the 1960s. Khadki had a large number of open areas which were converted by CAFVD into playing fields for both field hockey and soccer (Football), with as many as four of the former and two of the latter, thereby becoming a bastion of hockey. All tournaments in Pune were played there, on dust grounds that were watered prior to a match. As it expanded, Pune built stadiums for both these sports. Local association football and field hockey matches are held on the CAFVD Sports Stadium in front of the Khadki Railway Station west exit towards old Mumbai Pune highway. Field hockey matches are also held on the main road from Khadki to the Ordnance Factory, better known as Ammunition Factories. One pair of Football and Hockey fields has since been converted into residential areas, bordered by St Joseph's Convent Girls School on Burr Road, General Thorat Road and the old Pune-Mumbai Road. Khadki is surrounded on three sides by the Mula River, starting from Bopodi/Dapodi, past the War Cemetery, joining the Mutha River at what is known as Sangamwadi. Two historic bridges add to its military background, the low-lying Holkar Bridge and the Sangam Double Bridges- one for rail and the other for road traffic. Two more bridges have been added since 2005, one replacing Holkar Bridge as it would invariably be submerged in the monsoons and the other to shorten the distance from Deccan College area to Poona Engineering College and Deccan Gymkhana. Khadki has as many as seven military officer's messes.

== History ==
Khadki was the site of the Battle of Khadki, fought between the British East India Company and the Marathas in 1817 in which Baji Rao II, the Peshwa ruler was defeated. Soon after the war, the British set up a cantonment here. It then became the base of the Royal Regiment of Artillery's 79 (Khadki) Commando Battery. World War I Field Marshal William Birdwood, 1st Baron Birdwood was born in Khadki.

The well known Indian hockey player and former India captain, Dhanraj Pillay grew up here. An equally accomplished player of yester years, full back Joe Philips too was born and brought up in Khadki. Joe Philips represented India at a number of international meets including the Summer Olympics of 1936 in Berlin, Germany at which the Indian Men's Hockey team won the gold medal. The well known Hindi film actor K K Menon is also known to have attended school here. Raj Kapoor owned 11 FM Cariappa Marg. The Cantonment Office and Small Cause Court are on 17, FM Cariappa Marg. St. Ignatius Church and St. Joseph Boys School are behind the Courthouse.

== Khadki railway station ==
Khadki railway station is on the Mumbai–Pune railway route owned by the Central Railway zone of Indian Railways. Sinhagad Express, Sahyadri Express, Deccan Express, Koyna Express and Mumbai–Chennai Express halt at this station. It has four platforms, six lines and one footbridge and is electrified. This is an important stop for Pune Suburban Service. This station is to the east of Khadki's auto rickshaw stand and is near Khadki Bazaar. This station was built for access to Khadki Cantonment (Kirkee Cantonment) and the CAFVD officers accommodation which is just 3 km away. Today this station is mostly used by and for the Indian Army. The nearest major airport is Pune International Airport at Lohegaon (Viman Nagar).

== Kirkee cantonment ==
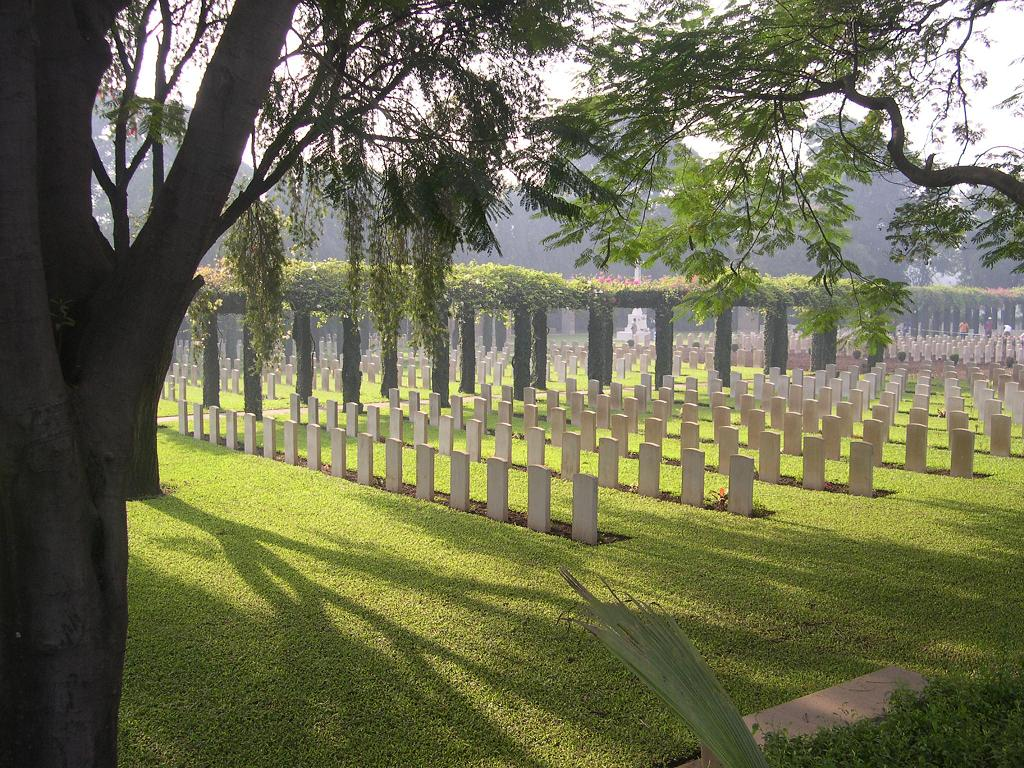
Kirkee War Cemetery

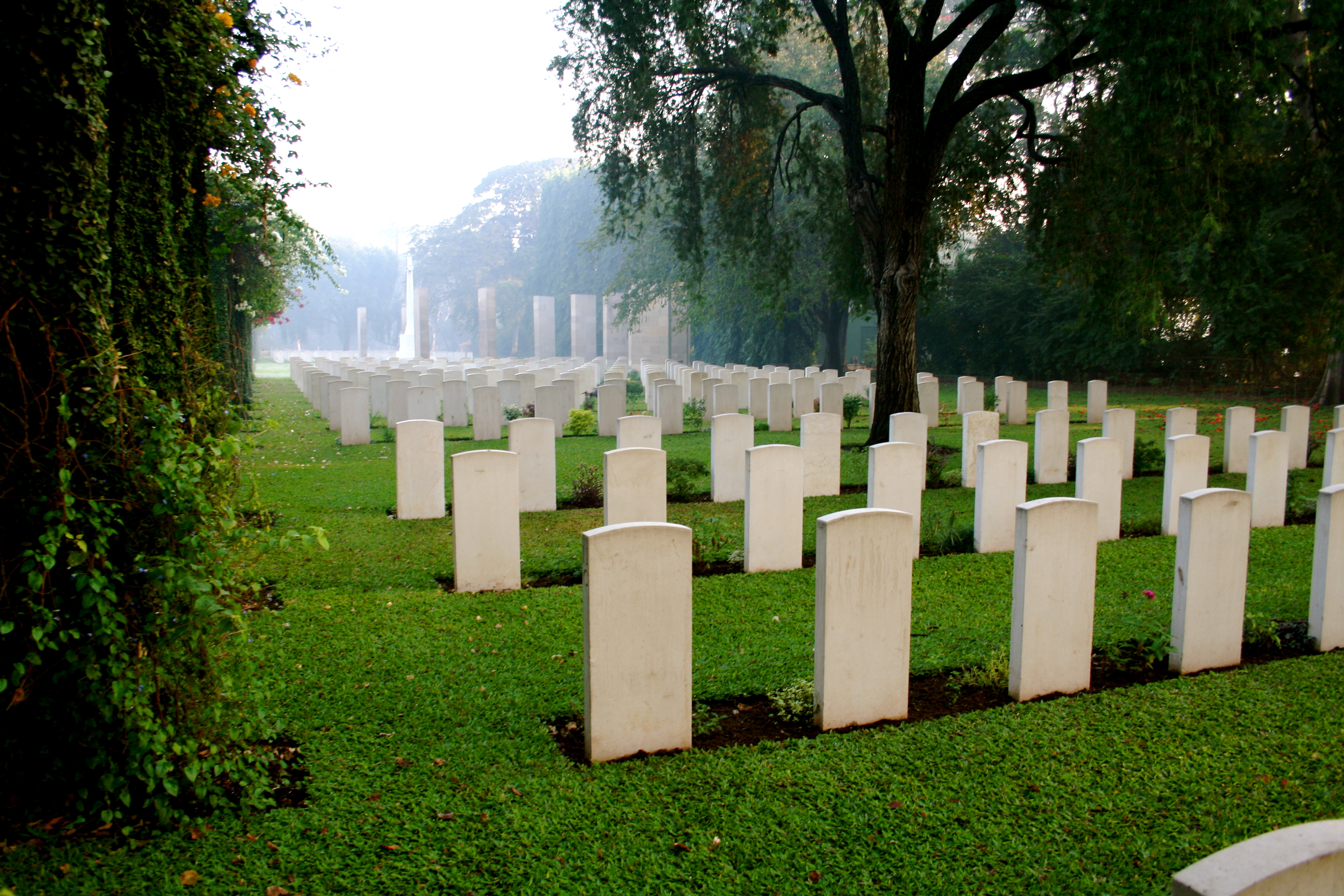
Kirkee War Cemetery

The Khadki (Kirkee) Cantonment is housed here. It is known to be as one of the richest cantonments in the country. When considered along with Pune Cantonment, it is the largest Cantonment in the world. These two areas are the green zones of Pune and contribute to keeping pollution levels down.

This area is also known for the Kirkee War Cemetery. and two special memorials erected by the Commonwealth War Graves Commission. The war cemetery holds the graves of 1,668 Commonwealth service personnel from World War II besides 629 from World War I who were reburied here from Bombay Sewri Christian Cemetery in 1962. The graves from Sewri are unmarked and their names listed on the Kirkee (1914–18) Memorial.

The Kirkee (1914–1918) Memorial is dedicated 735 Commonwealth service personnel who died in India in World War I and whose graves were in various locations where they could not be maintained, to the 629 whose remains were reburied within this cemetery in 1962 from Sewri Christian Cemetery, and to about 193 soldiers of East and West African origin who died during the period of 1939–1945 in various non-operational zones around the country. There is also the Kirkee (1939–1945) Memorial to 197 Commonwealth service personnel (excepting East and West African) who died in World War II and whose graves in other parts of India and in Pakistan are unmaintainable.

Khadki also has two major Ordnance Factories - Ammunition Factory Khadki and High Explosives Factory.

Station Workshop EME of Indian Army is also based in Range Hills. Range Hills area in Khadki is mostly occupied by defense service personals since most of the quarters of defense establishments are located in Range Hills.

== Demographics ==
As of 2001 India census, Khadki had a population of 76,608. Males constitute 56% of the population and females 44%. Khadki has an average literacy rate of 80%, higher than the national average of 59.5%: male literacy is 85%, and female literacy is 74%. In Khadki, 11% of the population is under 6 years of age.

== Relief ==
In late May 2025, following severe flooding caused by continuous heavy rainfall, the Indian Army's Southern Command launched a humanitarian assistance and disaster relief operation in Khadki village, located in Ahmednagar district, Maharashtra. The village, approximately 140 kilometres from Pune, was inundated with waist-deep water, leaving residents stranded and prompting urgent military intervention.

== Education ==
The town has Symbiosis Institute of Management Studies (SIMS), at nearby Range Hills, Khadki has the following schools

- Kendriya Vidyalaya R.H.E
- PM SHRI Kendriya Vidyalaya BEG
- St. Joseph's - one for Boys and another for Girls
- All Saints.
- Range Hills Secondary School, Range Hills
- S.V.S. High School, Khadki
- St. Thomas Public School, Khadki Station
- Allegoankar High School
- Tikaram Jagannath College
- Zakir Hussain Semi-English high school
- Garrison Children High School, Khadki
- Smt. C. K. Goyal Arts and Commerce College, Khadki

== Sports ==
Khadki is also known as a bastion of hockey. Local field hockey and association football matches are held on the CAFVD Sports Stadium in front of the Khadki Railway Station on Old Mumbai-Pune Road.

== Notable people ==
- Field Marshall William Riddell Birdwood, 1st Baron Birdwood, Commander-in-Chief of India was born in 1865
- Peter Hatch (born 1938), English cricketer
- Dhanraj Pillay (born 1968), retired Indian field hockey player and former captain of the Indian national team
- Sonalee Kulkarni (Born 1988), Marathi film actress
- Ajay Banga (Born 1959), business and policy executive
- Ruturaj Gaikwad, Indian cricketer and captain of Chennai Super Kings in Indian Premier League

== See also ==
- Pune Cantonment
- Bhooj Adda Bengali Restaurant in Pune
