= ONP Hospitals =

Hospital chain in Pune, India

ONP Hospitals is a chain of hospitals in Pune, Maharashtra founded in 1956. ONP Hospitals is a pioneer of IVF, maternity and childcare in India serving patients from across the world. The hospital have multiple departments including Gynecology, Pediatrics, Neonatology, Oncology, Cardiology, Cosmetology, Dentistry, etc.,

== History ==
The hospital is founded by Dr. H N Phadnis as Shree Clinic in 1956. ONP Hospitals is currently managed by Dr. Avinash Phadnis and Dr. Amita Phadnis.

== ONP Hospitals Network ==
- ONP Leela Hospital Shivaji Nagar, Pune
- ONP Tulip Hospital, Gokhale Nagar, Pune
- ONP Meera Hospital, Bhawani Peth, Pune
- ONP Leela Hospital, Pimple Saudagar, Pune
- ONP Silver Homes, Balewadi, Pune - Old-Age Home

The ONP Hospitals have 350 beds with 500 clinicians and over 1000 support staff. In the past 60 years, ONP Hospitals have treated thousands of people in India and from other countries.
