= Navi Peth, Pune =

Neighborhood in Pune, India

Coordinates: 18°30′22″N 73°50′28″E

Navi Peth is a posh area located in central Pune City, in Maharashtra State of the Republic of India established by British administration in 1818. The name Navi means "new" in Marathi, is derived from the term "new" as compared to other peths is located next to Sadashiv Peth.
