= Peter Hatch (cricketer) =

English cricketer and British Army officer

Personal information
- Full name: Peter George Hatch
- Born: 3 July 1938 (age 88); Kirkee, Bombay Presidency, British India
- Batting: Right-handed

Career statistics
| Competition | First-class |
|---|---|
| Matches | 5 |
| Runs scored | 60 |
| Batting average | 8.57 |
| 100s/50s | –/– |
| Top score | 15 |
| Catches/stumpings | 2/– |
- Source: Cricinfo, 14 March 2019

Peter George Hatch (born 3 July 1938) is an English former first-class cricketer and British Army officer.

Hatch was born at Kirkee, in what was then British India. He was educated in England at Malvern College, before attending the Royal Military Academy Sandhurst. He graduated from the Royal Military Academy in December 1958, entering into the Royal Engineers as a second lieutenant. He was promoted to the rank of lieutenant in December 1960. Hatch debuted in first-class cricket for the Combined Services cricket team against Surrey at The Oval in 1960, a season in which he also played against the touring South Africans at Portsmouth.

He attended Queens' College at the University of Cambridge during his military service, graduating with a B.A. in 1963. While at Cambridge, he played two first-class matches for the Free Foresters in 1961. He was the secretary to the college cricket club in 1961–62, a position he relinquished upon his impending marriage. In that same season, he played his final first-class match for the Combined Services against Northamptonshire. Across five first-class matches, Hatch scored 60 runs with a high score of 15. Shortly after obtaining his B.A., he was promoted to the rank of captain in December 1964. He gained his masters from Cambridge in 1967. He retired from active military service in June 1968, having received a gratuity.
