= Ganj Peth =

Ganj Peth is a general term, in the Marathi language, for a locality in the Indian cities. These include cities like Pune, Solapur, Madhavnagar, Karad, Ahmednagar etc.
