= Mukund Nagar =

Neighbourhood in Pune, India

Mukund Nagar is an area near Swargate, situated in the inner parts of Pune, Maharashtra, India. The name 'Mukund Nagar' is given to this area because the whole land was owned by late Mukund Lohiya. He donated the land to the government to construct houses for the flood affected residents in Pune when Panshet Dam burst on 12 July 1961 and life in Pune was devastated.

It is mainly a residential area with housing complexes such as DSK Chandradeep, Sujay Garden, Laxmi Vilas, Sammet Project and many individual bungalow plots. The Sujay Garden Commercial Complex houses many shops ranging from apparel to car part stores. Another popular landmark is the Brand Factory Mall. For medical aid, Ranka Hospital and other clinics and dispensaries can be found.
