= National Institute of Ophthalmology, India =

The National Institute of Ophthalmology, India is a hospital in Pune, India. It was established in 1993.
