= Market Yard, Pune =

Shri Chhatrapati Shivaji Market Yard Market Yard
- neighbourhood
- Country: India
- State: Maharashtra
- District: Pune

Languages
  - Official: Marathi
- Time zone: UTC+5:30 (IST)
- PIN: 411 037
- Vehicle registration: MH-12
- Coastline: 0 kilometres (0 mi)

The Market Yard in Pune is a wholesale market for agricultural produce like vegetables, fruits and flowers. It is located near Gultekdi in Maharshi Nagar and close to Swargate. It is an important commercial area.

== Governance and administration ==
A board of directors is elected according to the provisions of Maharashtra Agricultural Produce Marketing (Development and Regulation) Act, 1963, and rules under the act, of 1967, which consists of a chairman, a deputy chairman, a Secretary of the Market Committee and other Members.

Facilities provided by the Agricultural Produce Market Committee:

1. Plots for sale of agricultural produce
2. Water & electricity
3. Public rest rooms
4. Petrol pump
5. Weighing scale of 3 - 5 tons capacity
6. Live feed of market prices of all agricultural commodities of all the market societies in Maharashtra
7. Farmers' guest house
8. Grievance center
9. Provision of additional land in the event of surplus production
10. Free first aid center

== History ==
The wholesale market was originally located at ‘khalchi mandai’ in Budhwar peth. The then Chief Minister Sharad Pawar, shifted the APMC market in 1980 to its present location, in order to expand the vegetable and fruit supply throughout Pune city.

== Transport ==
PMPML buses connect Market Yard to various parts in the city. Market Yard is one of the important bus depots in Pune. Trucks and tempos are used for goods transport in this area.

== Commercial Importance ==
The Market Yard in Pune is an important location for trade and commerce for wholesalers and retailers of grains and other grocery items. Home to over 1000+ businesses, it is spread over a 10 square kilometers area, at the southern end of the city.

== See also ==
- Swargate
