= Pimple Gurav =

- Neighbourhood
- Location in Maharastra Pimple Gurav (Maharashtra)
- Coordinates: 18.5907721°N 73.8167953°E
- Country: India
- State: Maharashtra
- City: Pune
- Demonym(s): Punekar, Puneite, Puneri

Languages
  - Official: Marathi, Hindi & English
- Time zone: UTC+5:30 (IST)
- PIN: 411061
- Vehicle registration: MH 14

Pimple Gurav is a neighbourhood situated on the banks of River Pavana in the city of Pune, India. It is under Pimpri Chinchwad Municipal Corporation (PCMC).

== Geography ==
It is located in the northwest part of the city. Pimple Gurav is surrounded by Dapodi and Kasarwadi to the east and to the north, Sangavi to the south, Pimple Saudagar to west and Pimple Nilakh to far southwest. The Pawana River is located to the west.

The neighbourhood lies off National Highway 48 (India). Nearest railway stations are Dapodi railway station and Kasarwadi railway station which fall on Mumbai–Chennai line.

== Transport ==
A PMPML bus stand is near the old village, where buses carry passengers to Hadapsar, Katraj, Deccan, Market Yard, Dapodi, Pune Station, Kothrud, Pune Corporation, Akurdi, Warje Malwadi, Appa Balwant Chowk and other destinations in Pune.

Nearest railway stations are Dapodi railway station and Kasarwadi railway station which lie on Mumbai–Chennai line.

== Religion ==
Pimple Gurav is known for its Guruvayur Shri Krishna temple. Devotees regularly visit this temple and chant vedas. Lord Bhairavnath Temple is visited by a large number of people. Annual village festival (Gaon Jatra) happens on Hanuman Jayanti usually in April Month.

== Other places ==
The Rajmata Jijau Garden (popularly known as Dinosaur Park) features a 40 feet tall statue of a dinosaur.
