= Pavana River =

Coordinates: 18°34′N 73°50′E

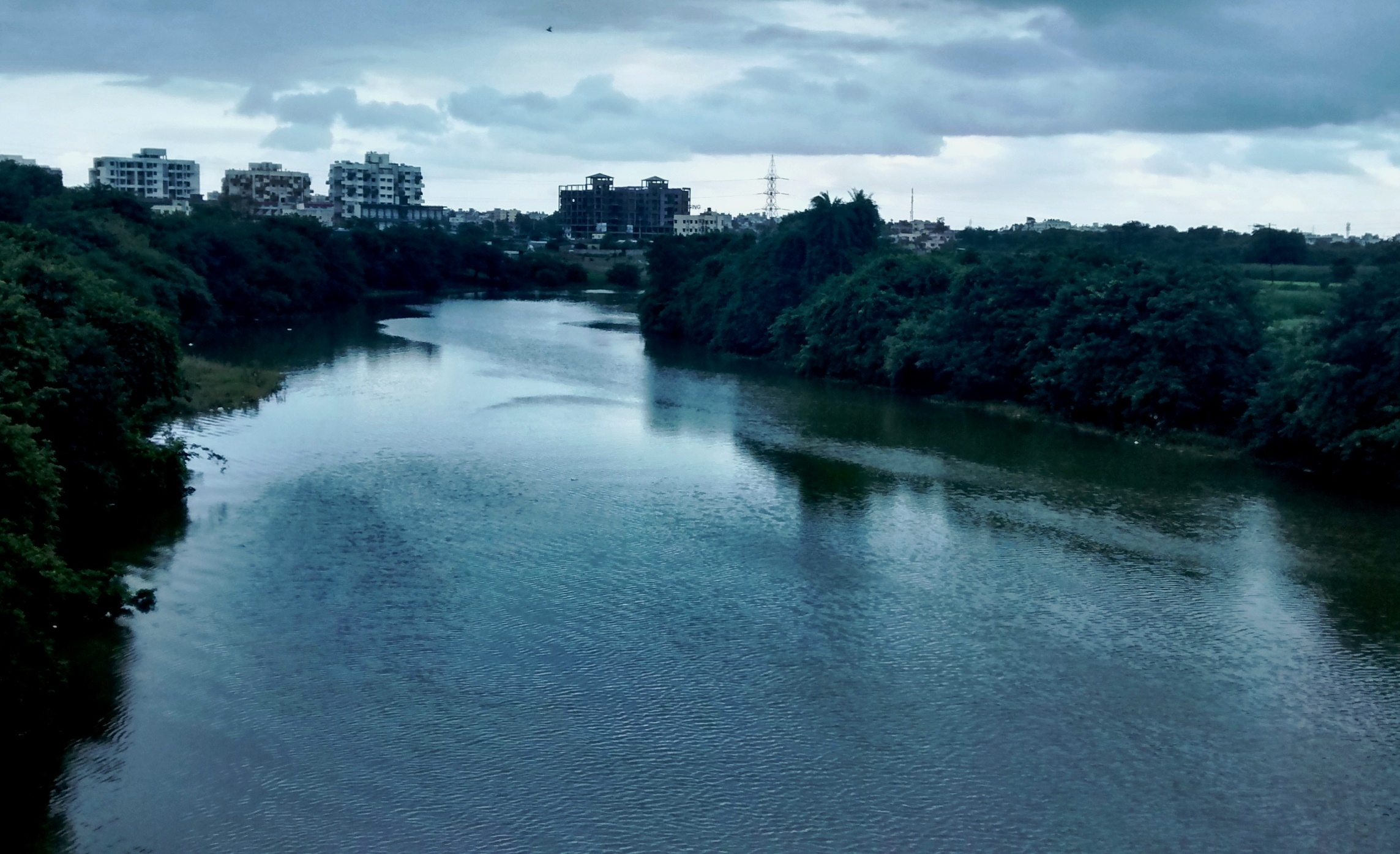
- Pavana River at Ravet
- Native name: पवना नदी (Marathi)

Location
- Country: India

Physical characteristics
- Source
  - location: Western Ghats
  - elevation: 650 m (2,130 ft)
- Mouth
  - location: Mula River
- Length: 58 km (36 mi)

The Pavana River is a notable river crossing the city of Pune, in Maharashtra state of India. The river originates south of Lonavala from the Western Ghats, and flows a total of nearly 60 kilometres (37 mi) to meet the Mula river in Pune City.

== Geology ==
Pavana River originates from the Western Ghats, about 6 km (3.7 mi) south of Lonavala. Flowing eastwards initially, it becomes southbound and passes through the suburbs of Ravet, Thergaon, Chinchwad, Pimpri and Dapodi before its confluence with the Mula river near Sangvi.

An earthfill gravity dam forms the Pavana reservoir. The dam, constructed in 1972, is 1,329 m (4,360 ft) long and 42.37 m (139.0 ft) high, with a gross storage capacity of 0.24 km^{3} (0.058 cu mi).

== Environmental Degradation ==
The river is reported to be severely polluted, causing the civic activists to blame the governing body for not taking appropriate steps to limit the degradation. Accumulation of silt and discharge of untreated industrial waste are the major factors of pollution of the river, and have made the river water unfit for any activity.

== Stealing of water ==
In 2018 Bombay High court slammed Maharashtra government for permitting Maharashtra Cricket Association (MCA) to use this river's water for maintenance of Maharashtra Cricket Association Stadium of Gahunje near Pune in the name of use for industrial purpose. In the hearing of Public Interest Litigation (PIL) of a NGO Loksatta movement. MCA was using this river's water from past six years in disguise of Industrial purpose. Bombay High court said, it is clear that MCA is not running any industry and using Pavana river's water for Pune stadium under industrial category is totally illegal.
