= Somwar Peth, Pune =

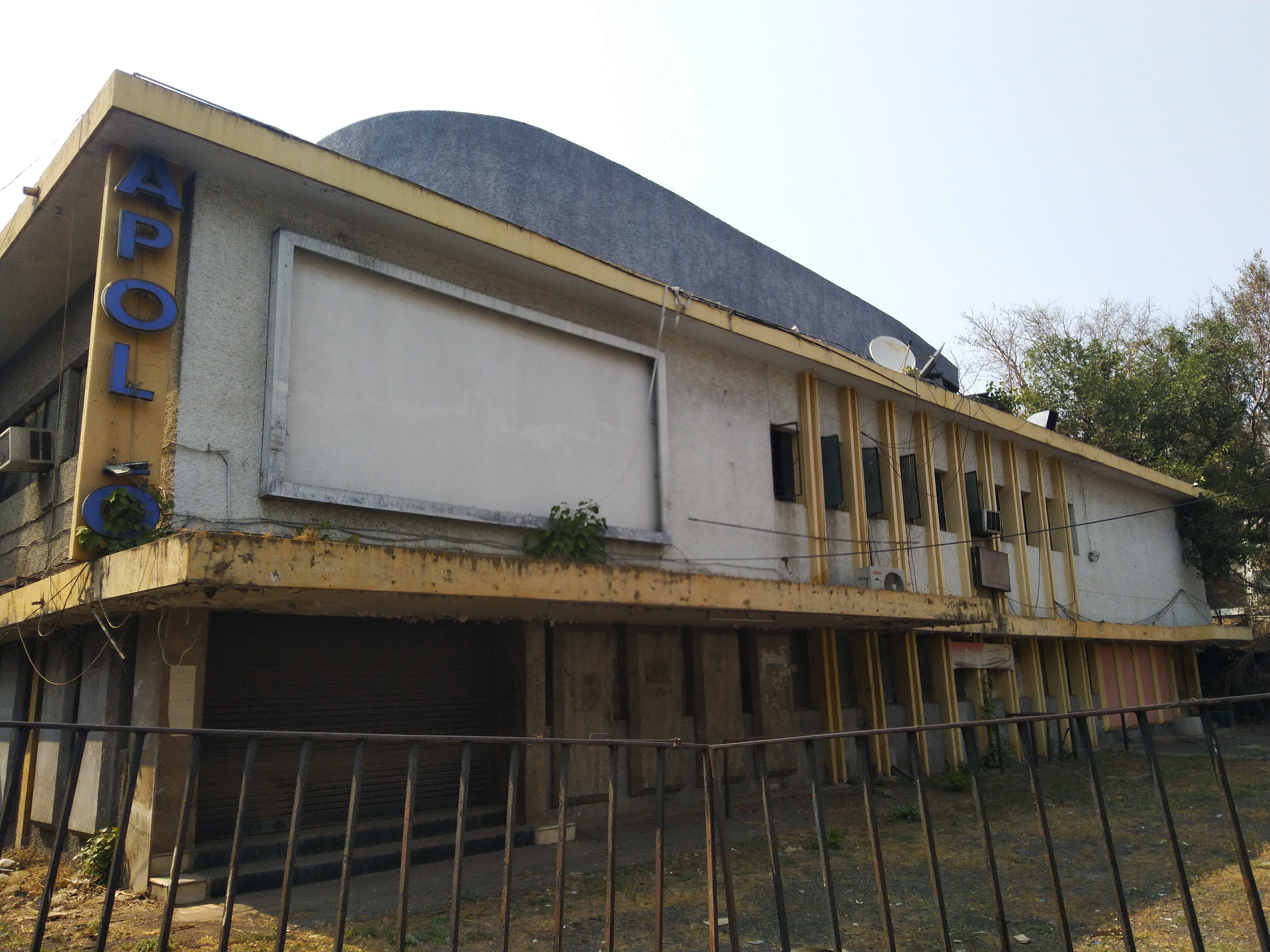
Building of Apollo Theatre in Somwar Peth, Pune. It was a single screen cinema hall which now stands deserted.

Somwar Peth is an area located in Pune City, in the Maharashtra State of the Republic of India. This area is bordered by Kasba Peth, Shaniwar Peth and Raviwar Peth. Somwar Peth was developed by Rango Bapuji Dhadphale, a minister of Maharaj Shahaji Raje Bhosale in 1625. This area was affected due to the raids by Adil Shahi dynasty in 1630. It was redeveloped by Dadoji Kondadev, a military and administrative officer of Shahaji between 1636 and 1647. The KEM Hospital (King Edward Memorial Hospital) and Shahu Garden are located in this area. Somwar Peth is connected to Katraj, Swargate, Pune Railway Station, Camp and other areas on these bus routes by PMPML Buses.Trishund ganpati the hemad pannthi temple and nageshwar mandir are the oldest temples in somwar peth.

== Established During 1637-62 ==
The people staying in this area were known as "Gosavi". It was also known as 'Shahpura'. These people used to lend money to others for various purposes before banks came into existence. This is one of the famous Peths in Pune. Apollo theater is famous in this area. Mali Maharaj, Narpatgiri Vishnu Temple,Prasanneshwar temple, Trishund Ganpati and Nageshwar Temples are well known in this area. The Employment Office and Zilla Parishad Building are situated in this area. The famous Shahu Udyan and Shahu Talav are legends of Somwar Peth. The Collector Office is also a prominent landmark in this area.

== KEM Hospital ==
The KEM Hospital is located in Somwar Peth area of Pune City, Maharashtra, India. This hospital, which is run by KEM Hospital society, is the largest non-government hospital organization in the entire Pune District. The hospital has 550 beds and serves patients from Pune City as well as from Pune Suburbs and rural areas in Pune District. It is conveniently accessible due to its location in Central Pune.

== Schools In Somwar Peth ==
The schools that are located in Somwar Peth area in Pune are the following:

- Saraswati Vidyalaya Union Primary School. (Co-Ed)
- Saraswati Vidyalaya Union High School & Junior College (Co-Ed)
- Balvikas Shikshan Sanstha Prathmik Shala. (Co-Ed)
- Abbasaheb Atre High School.(Co-Ed)
- Saraswati Vidyalaya Union High School & Junior College.(Co-Ed)
- Chief Executive Officer Zilla Parishad
- SI Raste Prathmik Vidyalay(Co-Ed)
- Indian Red Cross (Co-Ed)

== Movie Theatre ==
- Apollo Theatre.
