= Shukrawar Peth, Pune =

Area of Pune, India

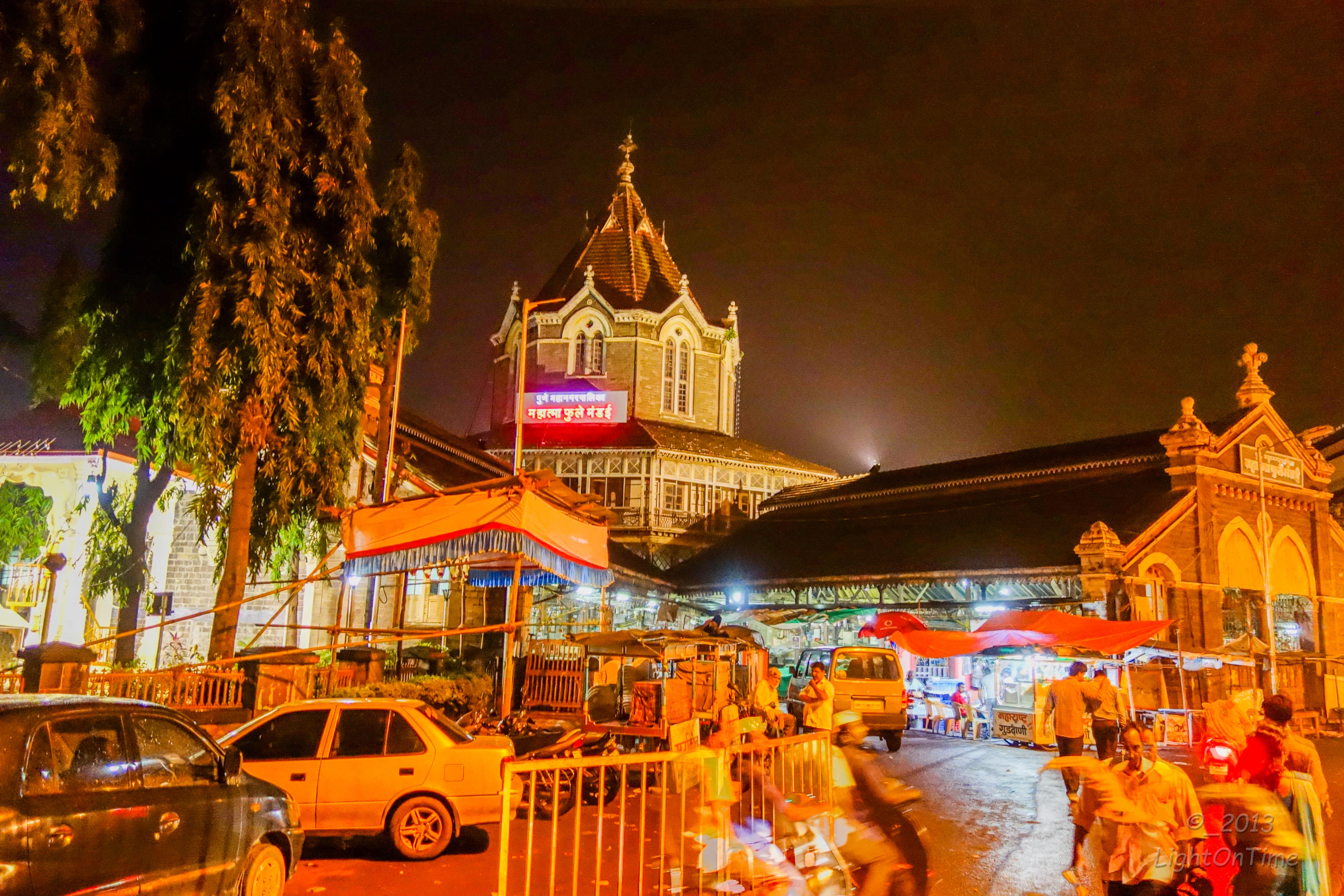
Mahatma Phule Mandai, the largest retail vegetable market in Pune, located in the Shukrawar Peth area of the city.

Shukrawar Peth is a peth located in Pune, Maharashtra, India.

Earlier known as Visapur, this was the first local peth, set up in 1734, and named by Bajirao I, as people began to reside in the area beginning with his era. It housed several military establishments of the time, which included a gun foundry, stables, infantry lines, a gymnasium, and military headquarters.
