= Guruwar Peth, Pune =

Coordinates: 18.505555°N 73.860755°E

Guruwar Peth
- Neighbourhood
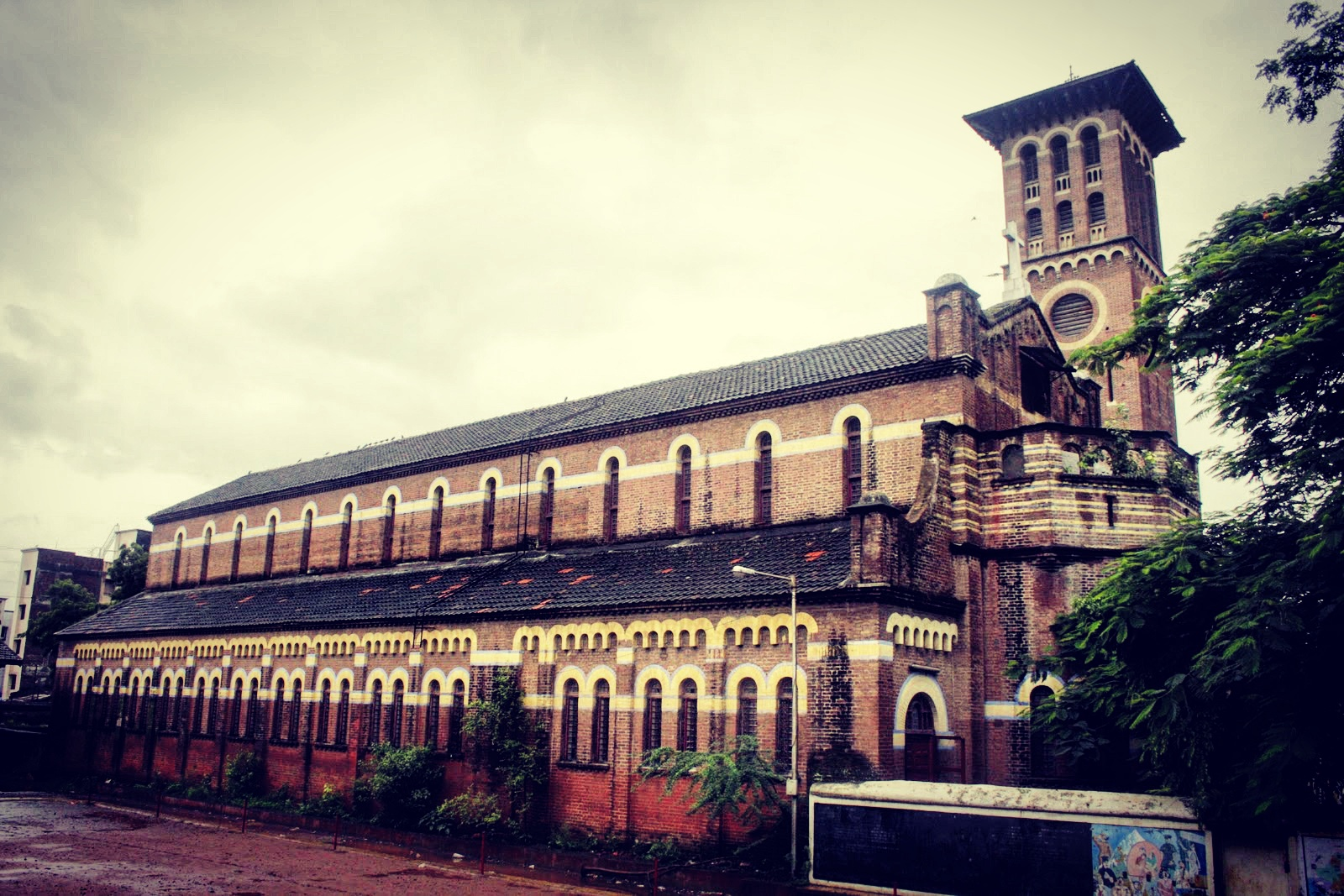
- The Church Of The Holy Name and its bell tower

- Location within Maharashtra
- Country: India
- State: Maharashtra
- District: Pune
- Taluka: Havelli
- Established: 1625
- Founder: Shahaji
- Named for: "Thursday" in Marathi

Government
  - Type: Municipal Corporation

Area
  - Total: 253.684 km^{2} (97.948 sq mi)
- Elevation: 549 m (1,801 ft)

Population (2006)
  - Total: 9,500 (approx.)
  - Density: 37/km^{2} (97/sq mi)
- Time zone: UTC+5:30 (IST)
- Postcode: 411042
- Telephone code: 020

Guruwar Peth is an area located in Pune (Old) City, in Maharashtra State of the Republic of India.

The Church of the Holy Name, built in December 1885, possesses the tallest bell tower in Guruwar Peth.
