= Chalio =

Sindhi Hindu festival

Chalio/Chaliho, also called Chaliho Sahib, is a forty-day-long festival celebrated by Sindhi Hindu community.

== History ==
According to legend, Mirkshah Badshah, a Muslim ruler of Sindh exploited the Hindus of Thatta region and ordered all Hindus to forcibly convert to Islam or face persecution. The Hindu representatives then requested a forty-day grace period from the ruler for their reply. During this period of time, the frightened Hindus of Sindh prayed to their river God Varuna to help them.

On the fortieth day, a voice was heard from Heaven: "Fear not, I shall save you from the wicked Mirkshah. I shall come down as a mortal and take birth in the womb of Mata Devki in the house of Ratanchand Lohano of Nasarpur". Ratanchand Lohano was a Hindu who belonged to the Lohana caste.

The Sindhis were relieved and rejoiced at this Akashvani. Shortly after, the couple announced the birth of Dariyalal (Jhulelal), who later taught a lesson to Mirkshah and his Muslim Followers, absolving the Hindus.

Henceforth, Sindhis worshipped Jhulelal as their Ishta deva. They started to observe forty days of fasting with full faith and devotion known as Chaliho Sahib. Those who observed this fast had to follow the following obligations:

- Not to sleep in a bed, only on the floor
- Observe Brahmacharya
- Not to eat fried eatables, non-vegetarian food, onion and garlic, white items like milk, curd, rice
- Not to shave or cut hair and nails, not to use soap and oils
- Wear simple clothes and not to wear leather shoes or leather belts
- Not to use tadka in any dish, etc. living a purely simple life

On the last day, they perform Pujas offering an earthen pot to the Darriya River. They offer akho [raw rice sugar flowers] to Dariya. Sindhis keep this fast avoiding non-veg, even garlic and onions.

== Festival ==
The 40-day-long festival is observed every year in months of July to August, dates vary according to Hindu calendar. This is a thanks-giving celebration in honour of Varuna Deva and Jhulelal for listening to their prayers.

To keep this tradition alive, all Hindu Sindhi, even today, celebrate the event by keeping forty days of penance.

While some people fast only on the first and last day of Chalio, others fast for the first nine days or for 21 days.

Sindhi men and women dance in front of the idol of Jhulelal in their temples to the tune of their folk music and bhajan, the devotional songs.

=== Key Aspects of the Festival ===
- Duration and Timing: 40 days, typically starting in July-August as per the Hindu Lunar Calendar (Hindu month of Shravan) - Rituals and Observances: - Chaliha Vrat: Devotees follow a strict routine of prayers, fasting, and abstaining from luxuries and entertainment for 40, 20, 11, 5, or 4 days (Allowed as per the modern faith) - Jhulelal Worship: Prayers and rituals held at temples and homes, commencing each day with Lord Jhulelal's Aarti, Akho (Jal Aahuti), Palav (Sindhi Ardaas), Panjda (Bhakti geet of Lord Jhulelal), and Dhun

Sindhis make a symbolic representation of their God Jhulelal in each and every household, which is known as Bahrana Sahib.

Baharana Sahib consists of jyot, sugar candy, phota, fruits, clove and akho. Behind is an earthen pot with a coconut in it, covered with cloth, flowers, leaves and idol of God Jhulelal. A sweet dish named akho, made from rice and sugar is offered during morning prayers. For forty days, they worship it, offering prasad and sing aarti to Bahrana Sahib. On the 41st day Baharana Sahib is taken to a nearby river or lake and immersed among singing and dancing of devotional songs, marking the festival's end.
