= Rasta Peth, Pune =

Rasta Peth is the oldest neighbourhood located in the city of Pune, India. The name is derived from the name of Raste who was a relative of Peshwa’s in the Maratha Empire.

Rasta Peth is a centralized location in the city. Doctors' offices and a library are located in the neighborhood.

There is a Dalit community there. Christian missionaries served the community during the British Raj.

Places such as Pune Railway Station, Camp, Shaniwar Wada, Dagadusheth Halwai Ganapati Temple, Laxmi Road, Bund Garden are within a ten minutes' drive by motor vehicle.
