= Pimpri =

- Locality
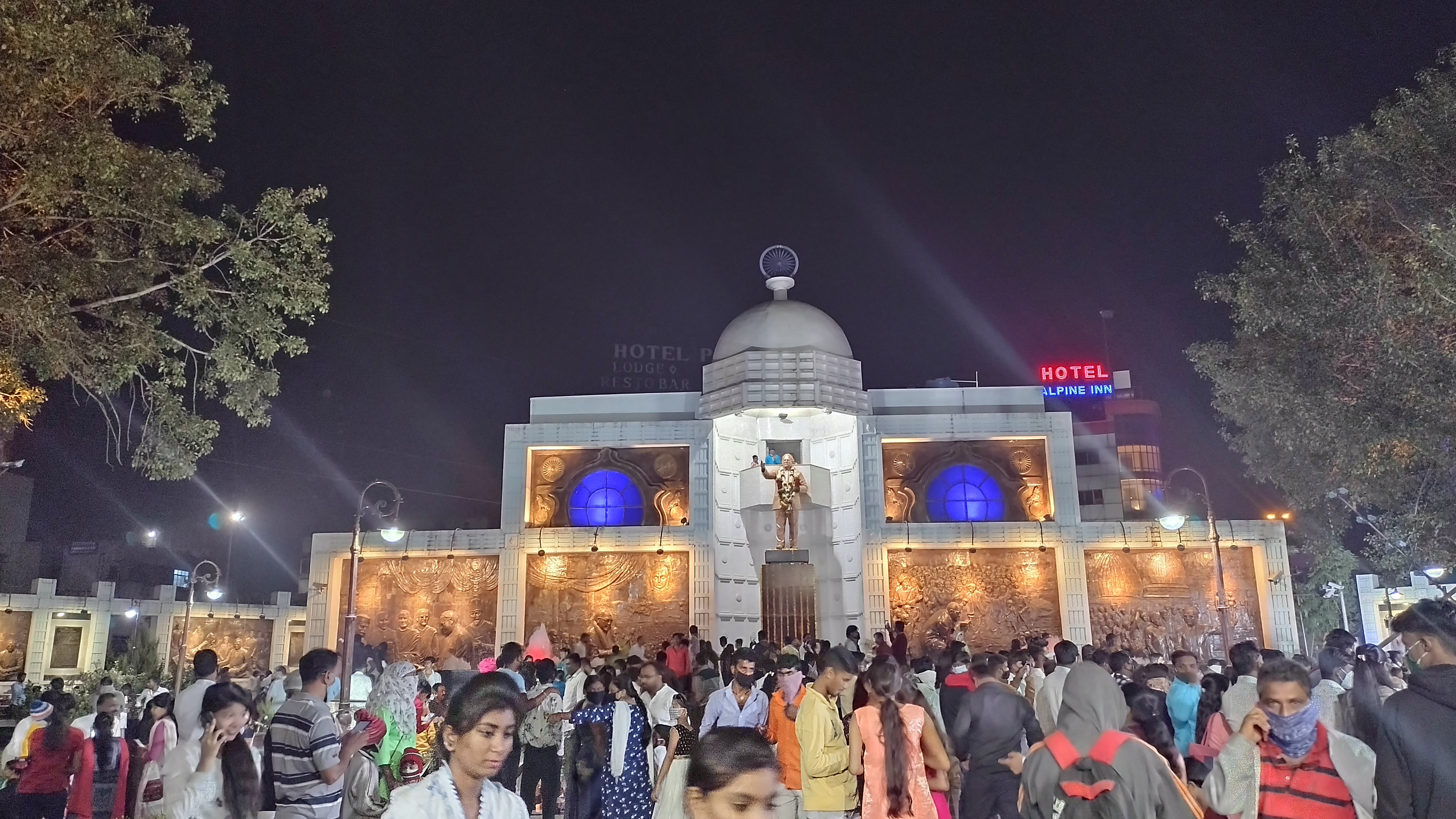
- Ambedkar Chowk, Pimpri

- Location within Maharashtra
- Coordinates: 18°36′48″N 73°48′10″E
- Country: India
- State: Maharashtra
- District: Pune
- Metro: Pune

Area
  - Total: 171.51 km^{2} (66.22 sq mi)
- Elevation: 570 m (1,870 ft)

Population (2011)
  - Total: 1,729,320
  - Density: 10,083/km^{2} (26,115/sq mi)

Languages
  - Official: Marathi
- Time zone: UTC+5:30 (IST)
- PIN: 411017, 411018
- Telephone code: 91-20
- Vehicle registration: MH-14
- Lok Sabha constituency: Maval, Shirur
- Vidhan Sabha constituency: Pimpri, Chinchwad, Bhosari
- Civic agency: PCMC, Pune
- Distance from Mumbai: 165 kilometres (103 mi) (land)
- Website: www.pcmcindia.gov.in

Pimpri is a neighbourhood in Pimpri Chinchwad in the northwestern city limits of Pune, India.

== History ==
Earlier Pimpri was in under the kingdom of Raja Bhoj & the land of Pimpri has been fulfilled by The great king Chhatrapati Shivaji Maharaj. After Indian independence from the British in 1947. In 1955, Hindustan Antibiotics was set up in Pimpri with the cooperation of WHO and UNICEF with the social objective of providing affordable drugs throughout India. It was inaugurated by India's first Prime Minister Jawaharlal Nehru on 10 March 1954. Production began in 1955. The establishment of Hindustan Antibiotics in 1954 marked the beginning of industrial development in Pimpri.

== Demographics ==
The main language spoken in the town is Marathi. It is a business hub in India famous for its clothing and eateries. Well versed with religious spots for all religions, Pimpri is an example of unity in diversity of the country and depicts a true Indian spirit. People are known for their helping hand and charity for various religious and other occasions. Mata Vaishnav Devi Temple, a replica of original in Katra is one of the most visited places. People from various parts of the country come to visit religious places by which Pimpri is surrounded. Langar is organised by various social groups on weekly / monthly / yearly basis. Cheti Chand Mela is celebrated with celebrities from Bollywood called upon. Pimpri also has historical schools, including Jai Hind School, Junior College Hindustan Antibiotics, and Dr. D. Y. Patil School and College. The neighbourhood also contains several hospitals, including YCM Hospital and D. Y. Patil Hospital.

== Culture ==
Gurunanak Jayanti, Chalio, Bahrana Sahib, Navratra, Diwali, Ganesh Chaturthi, Diwali, Shiv Jayanti, Ambedkar Jayanti and Eid-e-Milad are celebrated with lot of rigor and joy, Dussehra is also one of the important festival. All industries are closed during that time.

== Industries ==
There are many industries based in Pimpri. These include Tata Motors, Mercedes-Benz, Bajaj Auto, Force Motors, Eaton, Times of India, etc.

== Transport ==
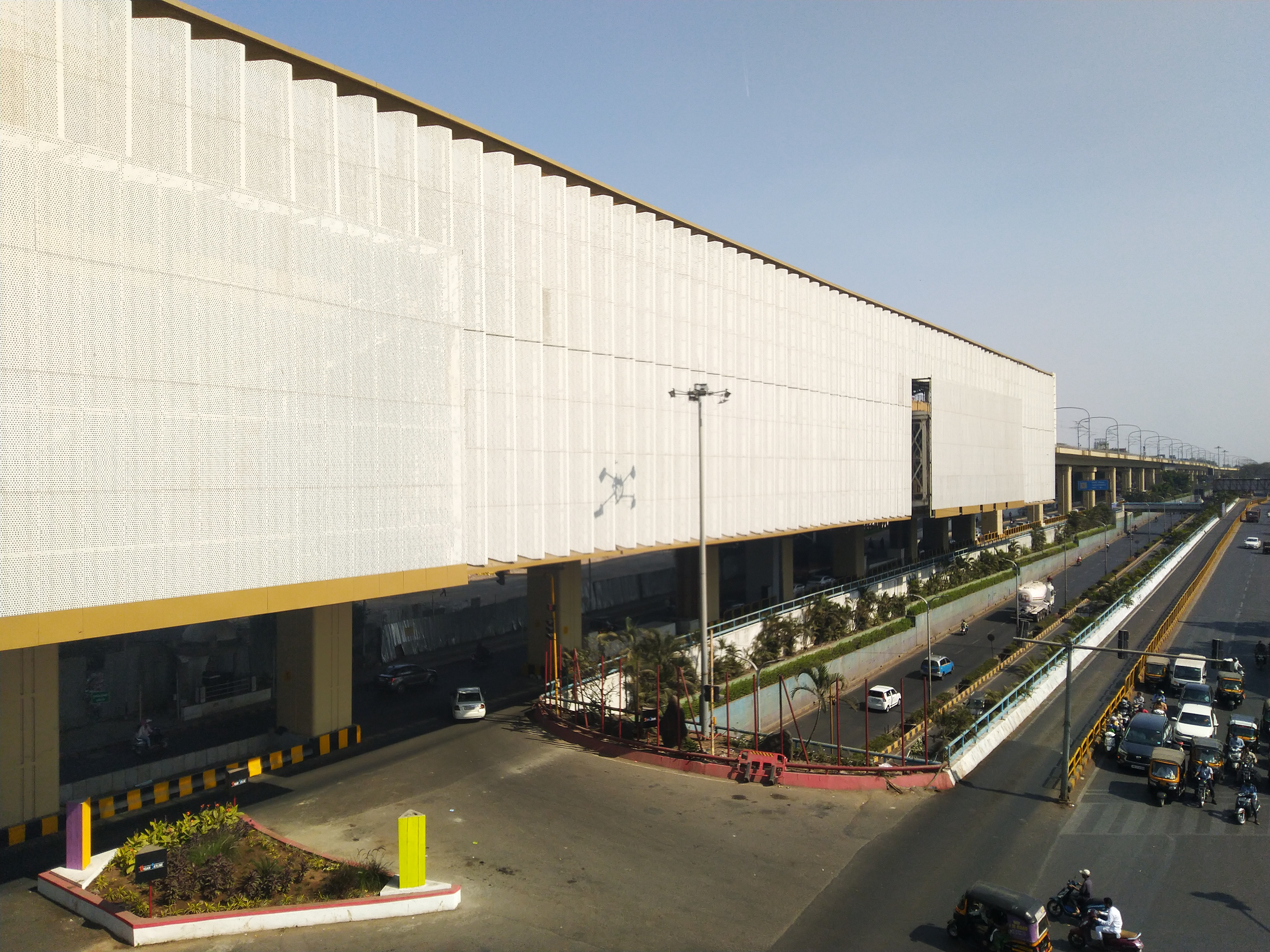
PCMC Metro Station, Pimpri

Pimpri is well connected by road, rail and air. The nearest airport is Pune Airport, with the Maharashtra government planning to set up a new airport near Chakan. Pune - Lonavala suburban local trains run through this area. The railway station for this area is Pimpri Railway Station. It has a State Transport Bus stand Pimpri-Chinchwad Bus Stand at Vallabhnagar. Pune Mahanagar Parivahan Mahamandal Limited (formed by merger of PCMT and PMT) operates the public transport system in this area. The Maharashtra government has proposed metro connectivity to Pimpri under the Pune Metro project. A Rainbow BRTS system is also under expansion in this area.

== PCMC ==
Pimpri comes under Pimpri-Chinchwad Municipal Corporation. This corporation is situated in Pimpri. It was established in 1982 covering an area of about 87 square kilometers.

Some primary schools and pre-primary schools affiliated to Maharashtra state board have been developed in this locality in the past few years. Many schools affiliated to national education boards ICSE and CBSE have been established within the area limits.

=== Schools ===
- VIBGYOR Roots 0 and Rise Pimpri
- Global Indian International School
- Nirmal Bethany High School and Junior College
- Alphonsa High School

== See also ==
- Pune
- Pune Metropolitan Area
- Pimpri-Chinchwad
