= Thergaon =

Village in Maharashtra

- Suburb
- Location in Maharashtra, India
- Coordinates: 18°36′49″N 73°46′22″E
- Country: India
- State: Maharashtra
- City: Pimpri-Chinchwad
- Municipal Corporation: PCMC, Pune

Languages
  - Official: Marathi
- Time zone: UTC+5:30 (IST)
- PIN: 411033
- Vehicle registration: MH 14 & MH 12
- Nearest cities: Mumbai
- Website: www.pcmcindia.gov.in

Thergaon is a suburb of the city of Pimpri-Chinchwad, India, part of the metropolitan area of Pune.

== History ==
Long back it was a rural village before the growth of the city included it in the metropolitan area. Today the locality is a well developed one with many large projects having been constructed within its limits as well as having several shops and market, shopping malls, marriage halls, hotels, restaurants, hospitals, public parks & Preschool.

== Economy ==
Pudumjee Pulp and Paper Mills runs a large paper mill there. The suburb has a municipal park called Bapujibuwa Park.

== Recreation ==
Late Moru Mahadu Barne Kridangan is a big sports ground for outdoor sports play such as cricket, volleyball, tennis, kabaddi, badminton, basketball, football, running track etc. Laxmibai Barne Udyan is another big park in the area with a children's playing area, a joggers track and also meditation center and amphitheater. Shubhankar Heights from Shiv Constructions and Ivana from Lakshmi Properties are among the several big housing projects in the area. A government hospitals is run by Pimpri-Chinchwad Municipal Corporation.There is also an International Preschool name EuroKids where children love to learn.

The prime area in the locality is Dange Chowk. Several restaurants and hotels are located around it. Aundh-Ravet road passes through Dange Chowk and a beautiful flyover has been built over it. Dange Chowk is on the Aundh-Ravet BRTS Route and is well connected by road to all parts of the Pune city. In Thergaon near Dange Chowk there is a public park called Shivaji Park which has a famous statue of Shivaji in black stone.
