= Pimple Saudagar =

- Suburb
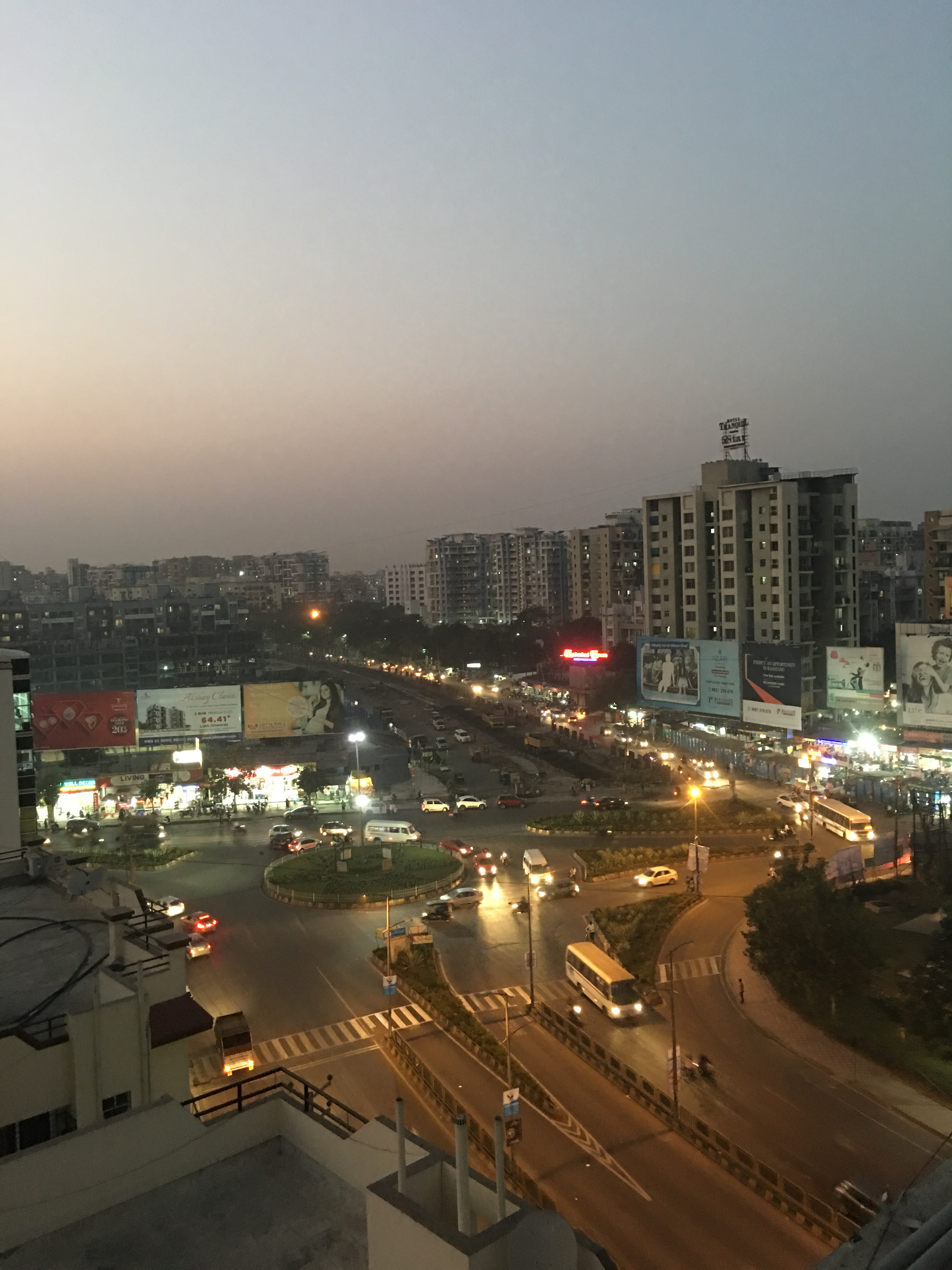
- Kokane Chowk
- Interactive map of Pimple Saudagar
- Coordinates: 18.5956°N 73.7981°E
- Country: India
- State: Maharashtra
- City: Pune

Government
  - Type: Municipal Corporation
  - Body: Pimpri-Chinchwad Municipal Corporation

Languages
  - Official: Marathi, English
- Time zone: UTC+5:30 (IST)
- PIN: 411027
- Vehicle registration: MH 14, MH 12

Pimple Saudagar is a neighbourhood in the city of Pimpri-Chinchwad, India.

In March 2025, the residents requested the authorities to clean up the rivers Pavana, Mula and Indrayani and opposed the concretisation of the RiverFront Development.

A two lane bridge was constructed about 30 years back by the Pimpri Chinchwad Municipal Corporation (PCMC) to connect Pimprigaon with Pimple Saudagar. In 2020, a parallel bridge was planned at a cost of Rs.12.5 crore.
