= Wakad =

- Neighbourhood
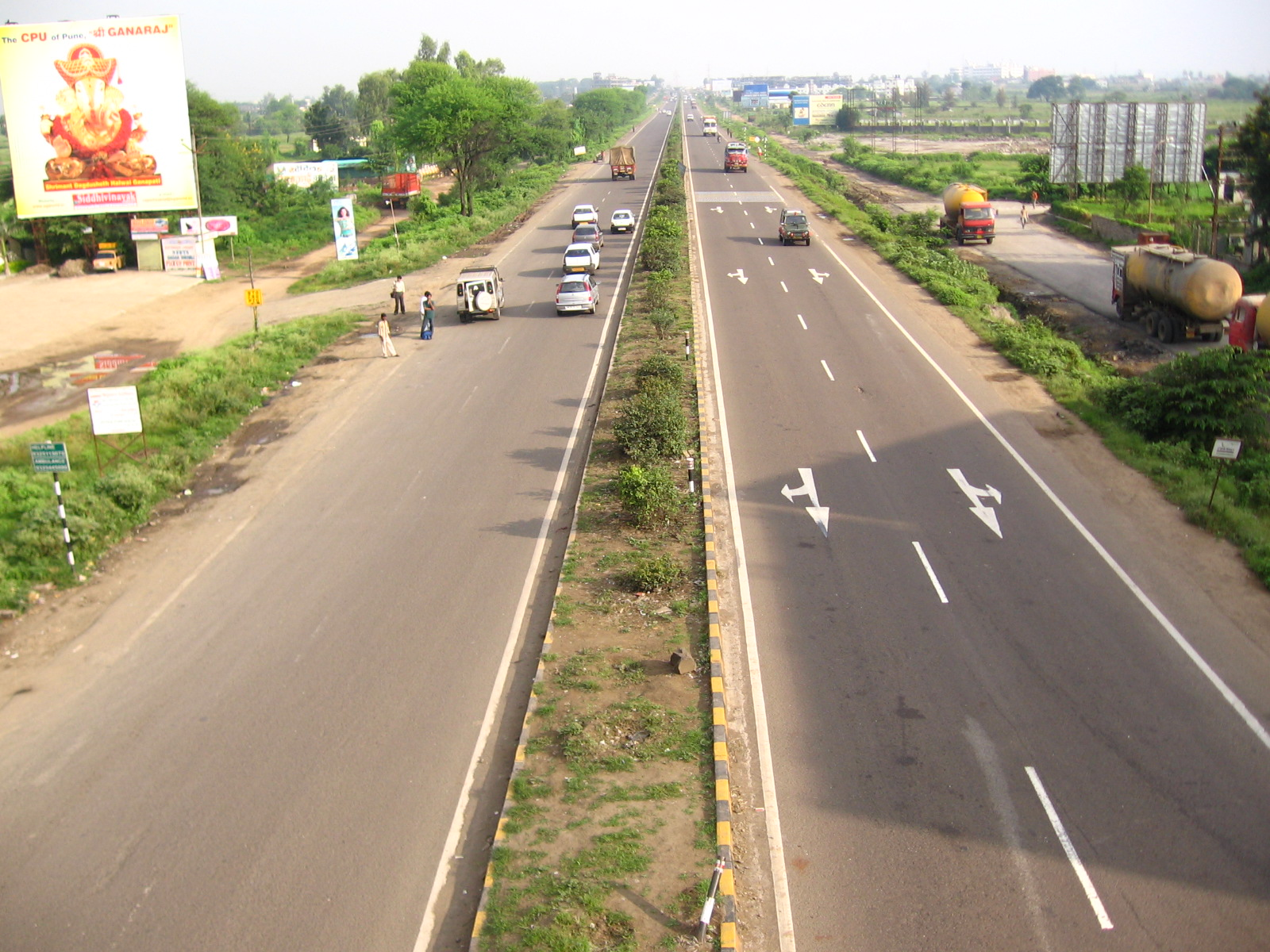
- NH 4 Bypass of Pune

- Location in Maharashtra, India
- Coordinates: 18°35′57.61″N 73°45′44.98″E
- Country: India
- State: Maharashtra
- City: Pune
- Elevation: 570 m (1,870 ft)
- Demonym(s): Punekar, Puneri

Languages
  - Official: Marathi
- Time zone: UTC+5:30 (IST)
- PIN: 411057
- Vehicle registration: MH 14, MH 12
- Governing Body: Pimpri Chinchwad Municipal Corporation, Pune

Wakad is a neighbourhood in the city of Pimpri-Chinchwad, India. Given its proximity to Rajiv Gandhi Infotech Park in Hinjawadi, Wakad has recently emerged to be a popular neighbourhood for techies and experts. It is very diverse and cosmopolitan.

== History ==
Wakad features a religious carnival known as "Jatra" in the temple of Mhatoba. The black soil of Wakad helped farmers grow sugarcane, groundnut and onion. Slowly the civic infrastructure in Wakad improved with regular electricity, water, roads and drainage system.

== Today ==
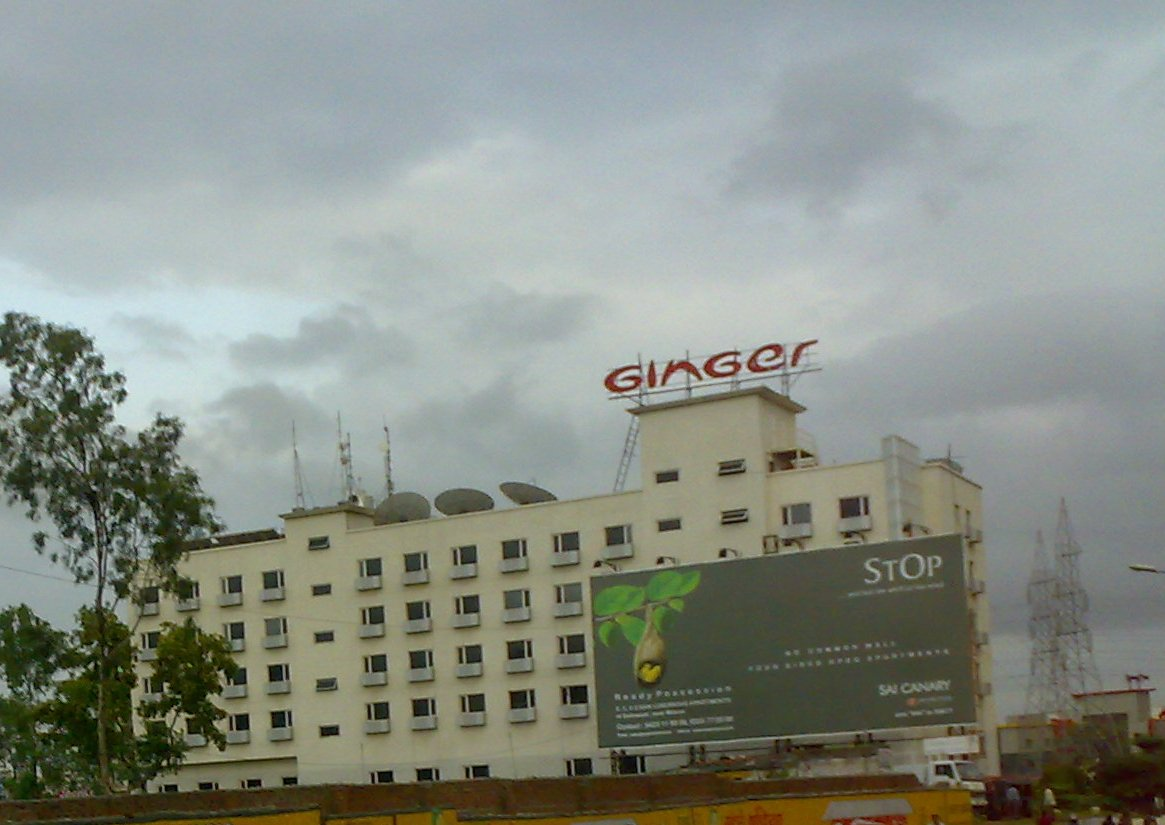
Ginger Hotel in Wakad

The phenomenal growth of Wakad can be attributed to the upcoming of the Infotech and Biotechnology park at Hinjawadi close to the Pune-Mumbai Expressway (west). In the last four years, the Pimpri Chinchwad municipal corporation has granted the maximum number of building permissions for projects in the area to Wakad and its surrounding areas. As a result, it is seen as a new hotbed of real estate growth in Pune. It is also close to three Bus Rapid Transit (BRT) routes, namely Nashik Phata-Wakad, Aundh-Ravet and Kalewadi phata-Dehu Alandi road. Towards the east is Pimple Nilakh, Pimple Saudagar and Aundh, towards the south is the Mula River, Baner, Pashan and Balewadi Shree Shiv Chhatrapati Sports Complex and towards the north is Thergaon, Akurdi, Chinchwad and Ravet. Wakad is all set to get Phoenix Market City in next few years.

Wakad houses a lot of people working in the technology companies (Infosys Ltd, Tata Technologies ltd, Cognizant, TCS, Wipro, Tech Mahindra, Capegemini etc.) located in the Rajiv Gandhi Infotech Park in the adjoining Hinjawadi area. Wakad is the new education hub of Pimpri Chinchwad as it houses Balaji Institutes, Indira College, JSPM'S Rajarshi Shahu College of Engineering College, Wisdom High School, Akshara International School, Euro School, G.K.Gurukul, Sesame Wakad Preschool etc. Wakad is criss-crossed by several main roads namely Bhosari-Wakad BRT Road, Sangavi-Kiwale BRT Road, Datta Mandir Road, Katraj-Dehu Bypass, Bhumkar Chowk Road, Kalewadi Road. The internal roads of Wakad are also in good condition. Public transport via buses is very well established in Wakad due to two BRT roads passing through the area. Also many State transport & private luxury buses ply near Ginger hotel at Wakad. The Hinjawadi-Shivajinagar Metro will pass through Wakad. Wakad has a variety of restaurants & cafes dotted in the area.

Phoenix; a Mumbai-based mall operator is opening its 2nd mall in Wakad.

== Streets and green cover ==
Even though Wakad is growing at a fast pace, the streets or internal roads are in a bad state. After facing many political hurdles, the roads are getting covered in concrete. The work has been very slow. Past 4 years the citizens have been facing issues with dug up roads for different pipelines and gas lines. 3 years ago, due to citizens pressure, the corporators decided to plant roadside trees. A large number of trees were planted along almost all roads under this movement. When the concretization was planned, some citizens opposed but the project was pushed anyways. The MLA Mr. Laxman Jagtap and the corporators showed a rosy picture of upgraded concrete roads with nice footpaths, large number of trees on both sides with benches underneath. But as the so-called development took place, the earlier planted trees were dug up and thrown away. Again many citizens requested to keep places at regular interval for tree plantation. This request was also ignored and now there is no place to plant a single tree. With so much of concrete pured and no shade, it becomes impossible to walk during summer or even on sunny days. Only the corporator from Vishal Nagar has been successful to maintain the greenery in their area. But Wakad corporators have failed badly in keeping their promises. As a result, Wakad is turning fast into a concrete slab. As a result, the underground water levels are going down very fast. Many societies have old wells which provide water during summers. But with this concrete development, these wells are not sufficient.Additional facilities are being planned for water storage.The constant construction of useless concrete roads have made "Datta Mandir Road" , a major road in wakad a traffic nightmare.
