= List of roads in Pune =

Overview of the various roads in the Indian city of Pune

This is a list of roads in Pune, a city in the state of Maharashtra in India.

National Highways in Pune

Note:Dark red highway indicates expressway and Light red highway indicates national highways

Road	Notes
Outer Ring Road, Pune (Proposed)	The Pune outer ring road or officially MSRDC ring road is a bypass, which will connect villages, Loni – Theur – Kesnand – Wagholi – Charholi – Bhavdi – Tulapur – Alandi – Kelgaon – Chimbli – Moee – Nighoje – Sangurdi – Shelarwadi – Shirgaon – Chandkhed – Pachne – Pimpoli – Rihe – Ghotawde – Pirangut – Khed Shivapur – Gogalwadi – Patharwadi – Bhivri – Kanifnath – Loni. The total length of this road will be 161.73 km with a total cost of ₹104.08 billion (US$1.1 billion). Almost 40 km road section is common with Inner Ring Road, Pune.
Inner Ring Road, Pune (Proposed)	The Pune inner ring road or officially PMRDA ring road is a bypass, 105 km long and which will connect villages, Theurphata – Kesnand – Wagholi – Charholi – Bhavdi – Tulapur – Alandi – Kelgaon – Chimbli – Nighoje – Sangurde – Shelarwadi – Chandkhed – Pachne – Pimploli – Rihe – Ghotawde – Pirangutphata – Bhugaon – Chandni Chowk – Ambegaon – Katraj – Mangdewadi – Wadachiwadi – Holkarwadi – Wadkinaka – Ramdara – Theurphata. Almost 40 km road section is common with Outer Ring Road, Pune.
High-capacity mass transit route, Pune (Proposed)	The Pune high-capacity mass transit route is a ring road proposed by the Pune Municipal Corporation for city of Pune. Such a road was proposed way back in the late 1970s. This will pass through the suburbs of Bopodi, Aundh, Shivajinagar, Erandawane, Kothrud, Duttawadi, Parvati, Bibewadi, Wanawadi, Salasburry Park, Hadapsar, Mundhwa, Kalyaninagar, Yerawada and Kalas comprising an expected total length of 35.96 kilometres having 34 junctions with existing roads of the city which includes 17 up ramps and 16 down ramps. Average speed on this road is expected to be 21 kmph. The primary goal is to reduce traffic congestion along with air & noise pollution. A Bus Rapid Transit system was proposed on this route but was later replaced by a neo metro project.
Mumbai–Pune Road	Main article: National Highway 48 (India) This road is a part of NH 48 (old NH 4). After the Mumbai–Pune Expressway was opened in 2002, this road came to be known as Old Mumbai–Pune Road. It starts in the suburb of Shivajinagar (earlier Bhamburde) and passes through the suburbs of Shivajinagar, Khadki cantonment, Bopodi, Dapodi, Kasarwadi, Pimpri, Chinchwad, Nigdi, Dehu Road cantonment, Kivale, Mamurdi, Gahunje, Talegaon Dabhade, and Vadgaon Maval all the way up to Mumbai. This road, measured from Pune to Mumbai, is nearly 156 km in length. The College of Agriculture at Shivajinagar, College of Military Engineering at Dapodi and Appu Ghar at Nigdi are on this road. The road is one of several used by devotees walking towards Pandharpur during Pandharpur Wari.
Pune–Satara Road	Main article: National Highway 48 (India) This road is also a part of NH-48 (old NH 4). It starts from Jedhe square (Swargate) and passes through the suburbs of Parvati, Bibwewadi, Katraj, Mangdewadi, Bhilarewadi, and Shindewadi all the way up to Satara and ahead till Bengaluru. The Market Yard near Gultekdi and Rajiv Gandhi Zoological Park at Katraj are on this road.
Dehu Road–Katraj Bypass	The Dehu Road-Katraj Bypass (also known as the Westerly Bypass or simply Pune Bypass) is a road that connects the Mumbai-Pune Road and the Pune-Satara Road, bypassing the city. The road stretches 40 km from Dehu Road cantonment in the north to Katraj in the south. It is a part of NH 48 (NH4, pre-2010) connecting Mumbai to Chennai. The road passes through the suburbs of Dehu Road cantonment, Mamurdi, Kivale, Ravet, Punawale, Tathawade, Wakad, Mahalunge, Balewadi, Baner, Pashan, Bavdhan Budruk, Bavdhan Khurd, Kothrud, Warje, Vadgaon Budruk, Narhe, Ambegaon Budruk, Jambhulwadi, Kolewadi and Shindewadi. The road was constructed in 1989. Rajiv Gandhi Infotech Park in Hinjawadi is situated off this road. Places like Pashan Lake in Pashan and Shri Shiv Chhatrapati Sports Complex in Mahalunge, where the 2008 Commonwealth Youth Games were held, are along this road.
Pune–Solapur Road	Main article: National Highway 65 (India) This road is part of NH-65 (old NH-9). This road starts in Pulgate and passes through the suburbs of Pune Camp, Wanwadi, Hadapsar, Manjri Budruk, Loni, Kinjirwadi, and Uruli Kanchan and goes to Solapur. From Pulgate, this road is also connected to Swargate by Shankarsheth Road. The Pune Race Course in Pune Camp and SRPF in Wanwadi is along this road. Magarpatta City is located off this road in Hadapsar. The road is one of several used by devotees walking towards Pandharpur during Pandharpur Wari.
Katraj–Manterwadi Bypass	This is a bypass road that connects Pune–Satara Road and Pune–Saswad Road, bypassing the city. It starts in the suburb of Katraj and passes through the suburbs of Katraj, Undri, and Handewadi up to Manterwadi.
Pune–Ahmednagar Road	Main article: State Highway 27 (Maharashtra) This road starts from a suburb of Yerawada and passes through the suburbs of Yerawada, Vadgaon Sheri, Kharadi, and Wagholi up to Ahmednagar and beyond. The road to Pune International Airport, called Airport Road, is an offshoot of this road in Yerawada. Pune Club Golf Course, Yerawada Central Jail and Wadia Stud Farm in Yerwada, Jnana-Deepa Vidyapeeth in Vadgaon Sheri, and EON Free Zone in Kharadi, are along or off this road.
Mundhwa Bypass	This is a bypass road that connects Pune–Solapur Road and Pune–Ahmednagar Road, bypassing the city. It starts from the suburb of Hadapsar and passes through the suburbs of Hadapsar and Mundhwa up to Kharadi. Magarpatta City in Hadapsar and EON Free Zone in Kharadi are along or off this road.
Pune–Nashik Road	Main article: National Highway 60 (India) This road starts at Nashik Phata in Kasarwadi, a suburb on Mumbai–Pune Road (NH-48), and passes through the suburbs of Kasarwadi, Bhosari, Chikhli, Moshi, Chimbali, and Chakan all the way up to Nashik. The Giant Metrewave Radio Telescope in Khodad is off this road.
Pune–Saswad Road	This road starts from Saswad Fata in Hadapsar, a suburb on Pune–Solapur Road, and passes through the suburbs of Hadapsar, Fursungi, Manterwadi, Uruli Devachi, and Wadki and ahead to Saswad, Jejuri, and Satara. Hadapsar Gadital and Hadapsar Airport in Hadapsar and SP Infocity in Fursingi are along this road. It is one of several main roads used by devotees walking towards Pandharpur during Pandharpur Wari.
Pune–Paud Road	This road starts from Paud Phata in the suburb of Erandwane and passes through the suburbs of Kothrud, Bavdhan Khurd, Bhugaon, Bhukum, Lavale, Pirangut, Kasar Amboli, and Paud and ahead to Vile in Raigad district. The first flyover in Pune, going towards Paud, was constructed on this road over Paud Phata in 1998.
Shivaji Road	This road is named after the Maratha emperor Shivaji. The road connects the suburb of Shivajinagar to Jedhe Square (Swargate). It is an important road in old Pune and is parallel to Bajirao Road. The bridge over the Mutha River on this road is named the Shivaji Bridge (also called Navapul or Lloyd's Bridge). The Dagadusheth Halwai Ganapati Temple and the Mandai Market are on this road. A skywalk has been proposed along this road to reduce pedestrians obstructing traffic.
Bajirao Road	The road is named after the Peshwa of the Maratha Empire, Baji Rao I. It is an important road in Pune and parallel to Shivaji Road. The Tulshibaug market, Vishrambaug Wada, and Sarasbaug are on this road.
Tilak Road	This road is named after freedom fighter Lokmanya Tilak. It runs between Alka Square in Sadashiv Peth and Jedhe Square (Swargate). Sir Parshurambhau College, Nehru Stadium, and Tilak Smarak Ranga Mandir are on this road.
Lal Bahadur Shastri Road	This road connects Alka Chowk to Sinhagad road.
Laxmi Road	Named after the Goddess Mahalaxmi, the road goes from Alka Square (Sadashiv Peth) to Quarter Gate Square (Rasta Peth). It is the venue for Laxmi Puja during the festival of Diwali. Publishing houses like Nirali Prakashan and Manali Prakashan, as well as various jewelry shops, are situated here.
Kumthekar Road	This road is named after R. B. Kumthekar, Chief Officer, Poona City Municipality, 1889–1912. This road runs parallel to Laxmi Road. Many ethnic clothes shops are situated here.
Jangali Maharaj Road	Jangali Maharaj Road is named after Sadguru Jangali Maharaj, whose ashram is on this road. Adjacent to this shrine is the Pataleshwar Caves Temple entirely carved in rock, which is the oldest temple in Pune, built in the 7th century AD. It lies entirely in the suburb of Shivajinagar. Jangali Maharaj Road was rebuilt under the supervision of M. D. Dalvi, Chief Officer, Poona City Municipality between 1939 and 1944. It is famous for its many restaurants.
Gopal Krishna Gokhale Road (Fergusson College Road)	This road gets its name from the political leader Gopal Krishna Gokhale. It was earlier called Fergusson College Road after Fergusson College, an educational institute established alongside it in 1885. It lies entirely in a suburb of Shivajinagar. It is also famous for its many restaurants.
Shankarsheth Road	The road is named after Mithapelli Shankarseth, one of the most well-known politician from Congress Lead and successful business owner in India. It connects Swargate to Pulgate via Golibar Maidan.
Narveer Tanaji Malusare Road (Sinhagad Road)	This road is named after Tanaji Malusare, a military leader in the Maratha Empire. It is also known as Sinhagad Road. It starts from Sarasbaug junction in the suburb of Parvati, and passes through the suburbs of Parvati, Hingne Khurd, Vadgaon Budruk, Vadgaon Khurd, Dhayari, Nanded, Kirkatwadi, Kolhewadi and Khadakwasla and then through Gorhe Budruk, Donje, and terminates at Atkarwadi at base of Sinhagad. An offshoot of this road from Donje goes up to the summit of Sinhagad. The Pu La Deshpande Udyan, which is a Japanese-themed park in Parvati, the Central Water and Power Research Station in Kolhewadi, Khadakwasla Dam in Khadakwasla, Defence Institute of Advanced Technology and Sinhagad are along this road.
Karve Road and National Defence Academy Road	Karve Road is named after the social reformer Maharshi Karve. It starts at Deccan (earlier Pulachi wadi) in the suburb of Shivajinagar (earlier Bhamburde). It passes through the suburbs of Shivajinagar, Erandwane, Kothrud, Karvenagar (earlier Hingne Budruk), and Warje (till the intersection with Dehu Road–Katraj Bypass). The first flyover in Pune, going towards Paud, was constructed on this road over Paud Phata in 1998. The Deccan Gymkhana, Ayurved Rasashala, and Abasaheb Garware College in Shivajinagar, Deenanath Mangeshkar Hospital and Joshi's Museum of Miniature Railway in Erandawane, and Maharshi Karve Stree Shikshan Samstha at Karvenagar are along the road. National Defence Academy Road (NDA Road) is named after the National Defence Academy, which is situated along the road. It starts at the suburb of Warje (from the intersection with Dehu Road–Katraj Bypass) and passes through the suburbs of Warje, Kopre, Ahire, Shivane and Kondhawe Dhawade. Unnamed after Kondhawe Dhawade, this road further passes through Kudje, Khadakwadi, Mandvi Khurd, Mandvi Budruk, Sangrun, Katvadi, Bahuli and Mutha where it terminates at the Pirangut–Lavasa road.
Bhandarkar Road	This road gets its name from the Bhandarkar Oriental Research Institute, which was established here in 1917 in remembrance of social reformer Ramakrishna Gopal Bhandarkar. It starts from one end of Law College Road opposite the entrance of the Bhandarkar Institute and ends at the Cafe Good Luck Square on Fergusson College Road. It lies entirely in the suburb of Shivajinagar. The sports clubs Deccan Gymkhana and PYC Hindu Gymkhana are off this road. It was home to the Marathi writer Pu La Deshpande.
Prabhat Road	This road is named after the Prabhat Studios. The road starts at Prabhat Square in the suburb of Shivajinagar and ends at the Film and Television Institute of India (erstwhile Prabhat Film Studios) in the suburb of Erandwane. Prabhat Lodge, Deccan Gymkhana, and Tilak Tank are off this road.
University Road/ Ganeshkhind Road	This road starts from the Rajiv Gandhi Bridge in Aundh and ends at the Kamgar Statue Square near Sangam railway bridge in the Shivajinagar suburb. The roads coming to Pune from Pashan and Baner merge into this road at the University of Pune Circle. Kendriya Vidyalaya Ganeshkhind, Bal Kalyan Sanstha Raj Bhavan, the University of Pune, Government Polytechnic, College of Agriculture, Bank of Maharashtra's headquarters are along this road. This road is also called University Road, Vidhyapeeth Road and Ganeshkhind Road.
North Main Road and South Main Road	North Main Road and South Main Road are parallel roads in Koregaon Park. Lanes connecting the roads house luxurious properties of business magnates, military officers, and politicians of Pune. The Osho International Meditation Resort is off these roads. the German Bakery restaurant is on North main road.
M.G. Road and East Street	M.G. Road stands for Moledina Grant Road. It ends at Pulgate. Hotel Aurora Towers is situated here. East Street runs parallel to the above road. It also ends at Pulgate.
Senapati Bapat Road	This road starts at V.S. Khandekar Square in the suburb of Shivajinagar and terminates off Pune University Circle on the Ganesh Khind at the Shivajinagar–Aundh border. The Chaturshringi Temple lies on this road, and an annual street fair is held during the festival of Navaratri. The NCC, Balbharati Bhavan, Shantanurao Kirloskar International Convention Center (ICC), a pagoda and Dr. Babasaheb Ambedkar memorial, the JW Marriott hotel and the Symbiosis International University are along this road.
Law College Road	The road is now known as Chiplunkar Road. The road was named after ILS Law College, which is situated on this road. The road starts at the V.S.Khandekar Square in the suburb of Shivajinagar and runs up to Nal stop on Karve Road in the suburb of Erandwane. The Film and Television Institute of India, the National Film Archive of India, and Bhandarkar Oriental Research Institute are situated along this road.
Aundh–Ravet Road	This road runs from the suburb of Aundh to Ravet, as one of the alternative roads to Mumbai–Pune road. It has a length of 11 km. Major areas connected by this road are Aundh, Sangvi, Pimple Nilakh, Pimple Gurav, Pimple Saudagar, Rahatani, Wakad, Thergaon, Tathawade, Punawale, and Ravet.
Pashan–Sus Road	This road starts from the suburb of Pashan and passes through the suburbs of Pashan, Sus, Nande, and Chande. The Indian Institute of Science Education and Research at Pashan, Institute of Hospitality Management, Research & Development at Sus, and International School of Business and Media at Nande are along or off this road.
