= Ravet =

Ravet may refer to:

== Places ==
- Ravet, Pune, a village near Pune, Maharashtra, India
- Ravet, Raigarh, a village in Raigarh district, Maharashtra, India

== People ==
- Ward de Ravet, Belgian actor
- Yoric Ravet, French footballer

== Other ==
- Ravet (river), a tributary of the river Aube, France.
