= Pramod Mande =

Indian historian and writer (1954–2017)

Pramod Maruti Mande
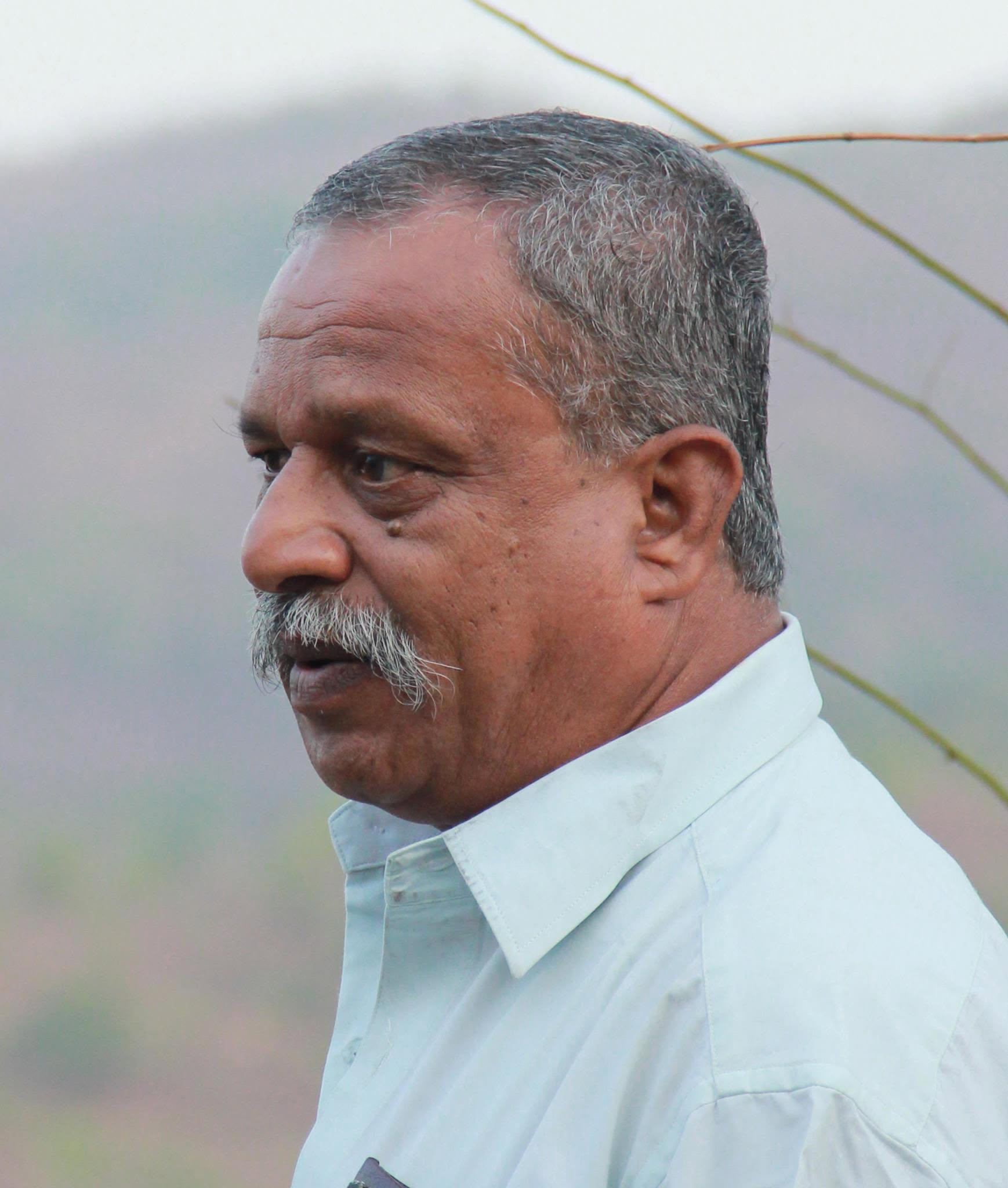
- Born: 18 December 1954; Pune, India
- Died: 17 October 2017 (aged 62); Pune, India
- Citizenship: Indian
- Occupations: Historian, Writer, Speaker, Orator, Influencer
- Spouse: Late. Pratibha(aka. Jayashree)
- Children: Two Sons 1. Vishal 2. Bharat
- Parent: Late. Maruti Mande

Pramod Maruti Mande (18 December 1954 – 17 October 2017), popularly known as Bhau, was an Indian historian and writer. He was rewarded as Durgamaharshi and Sahyadri Putra. He specialised in writing about the history of Indian forts and freedom fighters.

== Works ==
Mande travelled widely for 40 years and surveyed more than 2,000 forts, believing that forts must be seen and observed to understand the work of Chhatrapati Shivaji Maharaj. He built up a collection of over 15,000 books on history, 3,000 slides and 200,000 photos of various forts, and more than 450 pictures and oil paintings of Indian freedom fighters.

He used to conduct two programs includes History of Shivaji Maharaj and Aazadi ke diwane. He travelled 2 times on the exact route of Rajgad to Agra and Agra to Rajgad, a route passed through seven states and over 1,000 kilometers on which Shivaji Maharaj had gone to Agra to meet Aurangzeb as per Treaty of Purandhar. He has delivered more than five thousands of lectures on Shivaji Maharaj to create interest about Shivaji Maharaj in younger generations. His 200 exhibitions on history talks about his works.

He was associated with many organisations working on history. These included:

- पुणे व्हेंचर्स Pune Ventures
- श्री शिवाजी रायगड स्मारक मंडळ Shri Shivaji Raigad Smarak Mandal
- वडवानल प्रतिष्ठान Vadvanal Pratishtan
- भारत इतिहास संशोधक मंडळ Bhartiy itihas sanshodhan mandal
- लोकसेवा प्रतिष्ठान Lokseva pratishthan
- भक्तीशक्ती प्रतिष्ठान Bhaktishakti Pratishthan
- गड किल्ले सेवा संस्था Gad Kille Seva Sanstha
- लोकसेवा ट्रेकिंग अकादमी Lokseva Trekking Academy
- नेताजी सुभाषचंद्र बोस सैनिकी शाळा Netaji Subhashchandra Bose Military School
- झुंजार शिलेदार सेवा संस्था Zunjar Shiledar Seva Sanstha

== Books ==
- FORTS & PALACES IN INDIA : Encyclopedia of 4000+ Forts & Palaces across India
- आझादी के दिवाने Azadi ke Diwane
- स्वातंत्र्य संग्रामातील अग्निशलाका Swatantrya sangramatil agnishalaka
- स्वातंत्र्य संग्रामातील अंगार Swatantrya sangramatil angar
- गड किल्ले महाराष्ट्राचे Gad kille Maharashtrache
- १११ क्रांतिकारकांचे संक्षिप्त चरित्र 111 Krantikarkanche sankshipt charitra
- स्वातंत्र्य संग्रामातील समिधा (चरित्रकथनात्मक) Swatantrya sangramatil samidha
- महाराष्ट्रातील रत्नभांडार Maharashtratil ratnabhandar

== Personal life ==
Mande worked for Tata Motors. He took retirement after 22 years of service to concentrate on the research on forts.

== Death ==
Mande died in Deenanath Mangeshkar Hospital, in Pune on 17 October 2017 due to illness at the age of 63.
