= Vadgaon Budruk =

Coordinates: 18°28′13″N 73°49′47″E

Vadgaon Budruk Vadgaon (Br)
- suburb
- Interactive map of Vadgaon Budruk
- Country: India
- State: Maharashtra
- District: Pune
- Founder: Gangaram Bhau Dangat Patil

Government
  - Body: Pune corporation

Languages
  - Official: Marathi
- Time zone: UTC+5:30 (IST)
- PIN: 411 041
- Vehicle registration: MH-12
- Nearest city: PUNE
- Vidhan Sabha constituency: Khadakwasla
- Civic agency: Pune corporation

Vadgaon Budruk, known as Vadgaon in the local area, is one of the many upcoming suburbs of Pune, Maharashtra, India. It is located on Sinhgad Road.

== Location & History ==
Vadgaon Budruk village is situated about 8 km from center of Pune. It was a very small village before 1990 with farming being main economic activity. Vadgaon Budruk has catchment area in western hills and which brought good soil as well as sufficient water for farming. The village took the name of Vadgaon as it has a number of "Vad"/ Banyan trees. With a dense forest in proximity to river and creek areas, Vadgaon Budruk was one of the stops during sheep migration from Konkan to regions inland. Vadgaon Budruk can be seen directly as a communication point between Sinhgad fort and Pune city. It is known for the Sinhgad Institute & also popular as with middle-class families. Nowadays it is well known place in the IT industry as many IT & BPO employees reside in the area.

Vadgaon Budruk saw lot of change after 2005, with significant increase in population of Pune. The change from village to suburb took toll on environment. Major part of the forest, fertile lands were converted to apartment complexes of concrete and tar. Most of the land in Vadgaon Budruk is now occupied by housing complexes. This is one of the important bases of Pune middle-class people.

In this area, most of the population is Maharashtrian. And it is easily accessible area for people from Satara, Sangli & Kolhapur district.

== Health ==
- Cipla Foundation for Cancer
- Deenanath Mangeshkar Hospital
- Jagtap Hospital
- Kashibai Navle Hospital, Narhe
- Lodha Hospital
- Madhukar Hospital (Gynaecologist)
- Mai Mangeshkar Hospital
- Mankar Hospital (Child specialist)
- Shinde Hospital
- Sinhgad Dental College
- Vinayak Hospital

== Transport ==
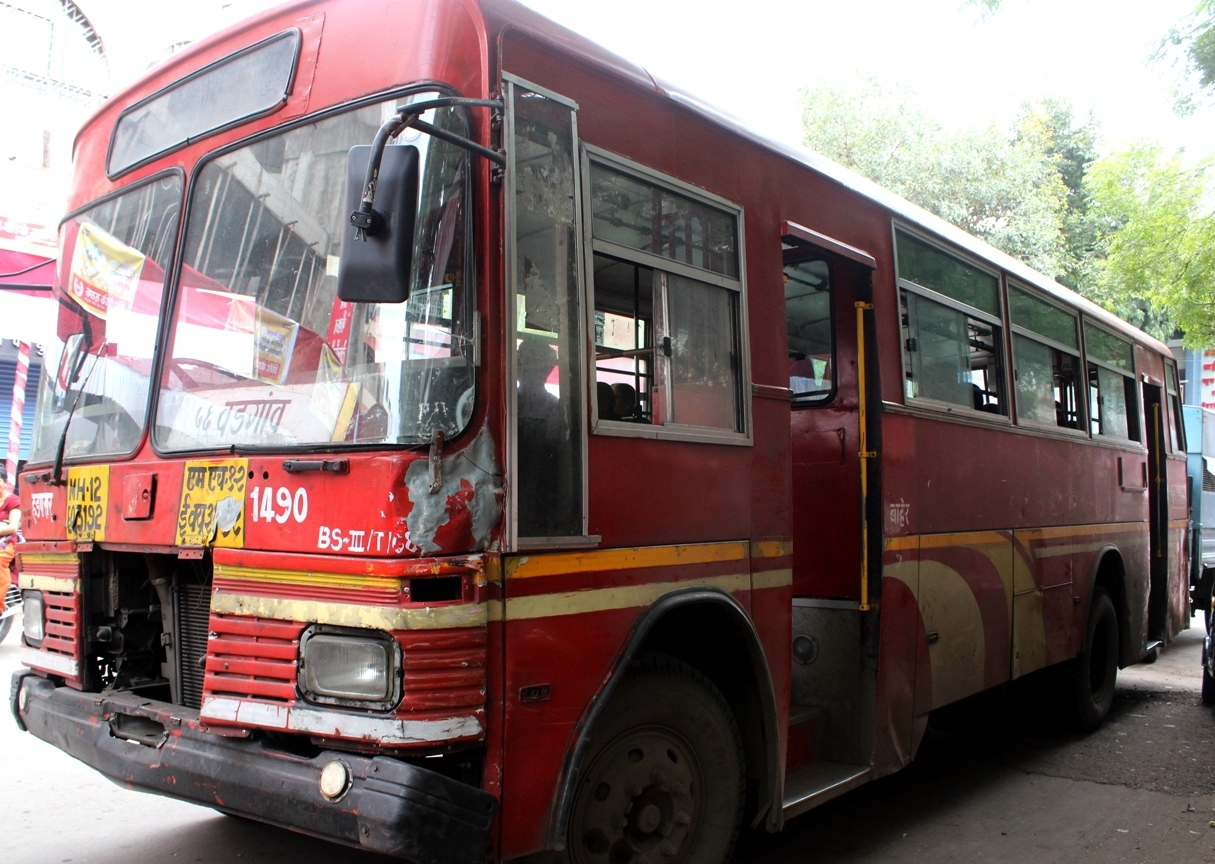
Bus number 56 connects Shanipar to Vadgaon

Vadgaon Budruk has excellent connectivity to Pune city via PMPML, buses, auto etc. There are frequent buses from Swargate to Dhayari. The city is very close to Pune-Bangalore highway and has good connectivity at both sides. Uber and Ola cabs are also available in this area.

== See also ==
- Pune
- List of neighbourhoods in Pune
