= Tulshibaug =

- Interactive map of Tulshibaug
- Country: India
- State: Maharashtra
- City: Pune
- Named for: Tulshibaug Wada
- Time zone: UTC+5:30 (IST)
- Postal code: 411002

Tulshibaug (Marathi: तुळशीबाग) is an area in Pune City in the state of Maharashtra, India. It is located in the old city area. Its main features are a historic temple precinct and a large market.

== Location ==
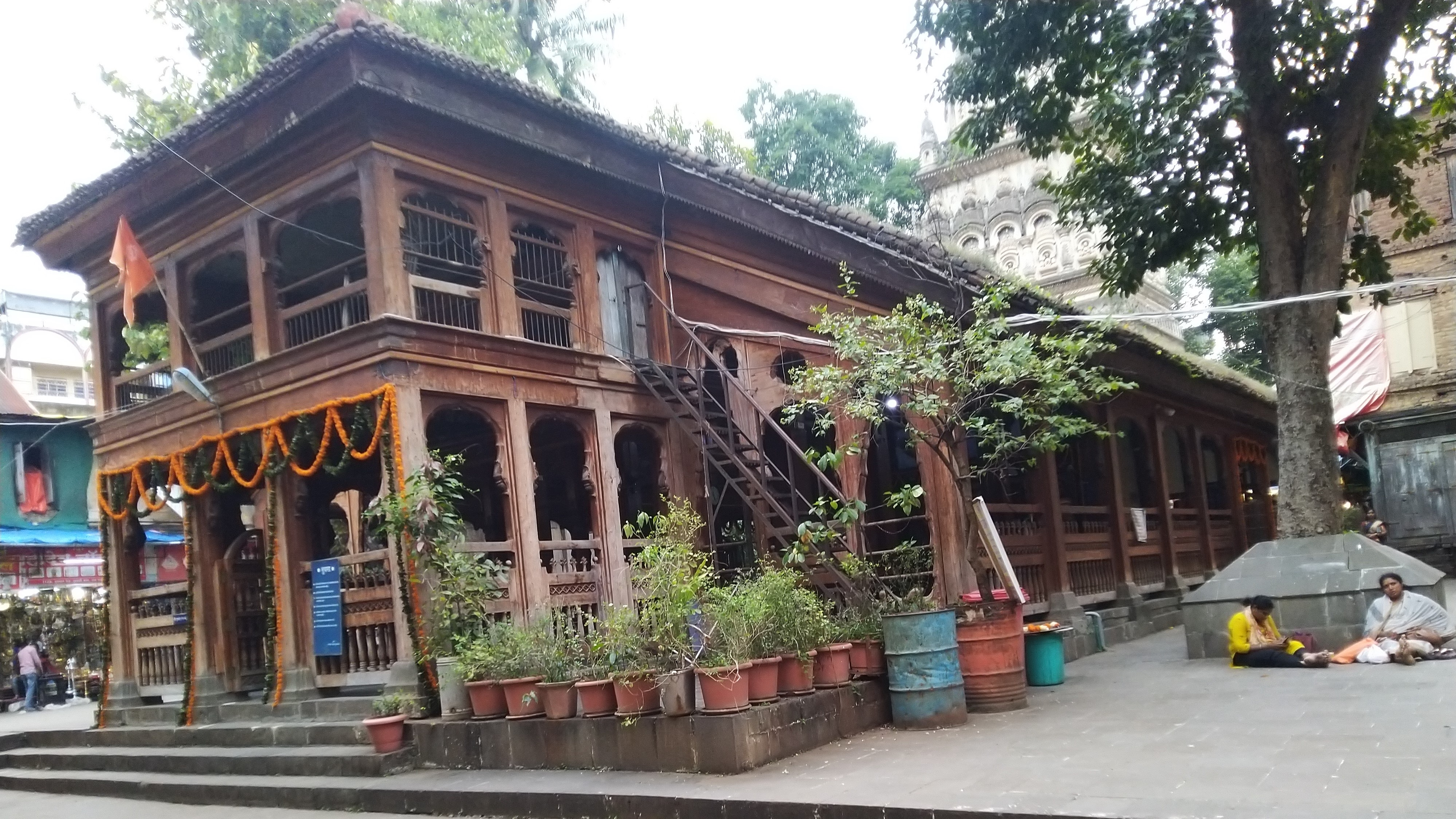
Tulshibaug Ram Mandir

The Tulshibaug area is located in the old city of Pune. The area is accessed via three roads: Bajirao Road, Laxmi Road, and the road connecting Shanipar to Shivaji Road.

== The Ram temple precinct ==
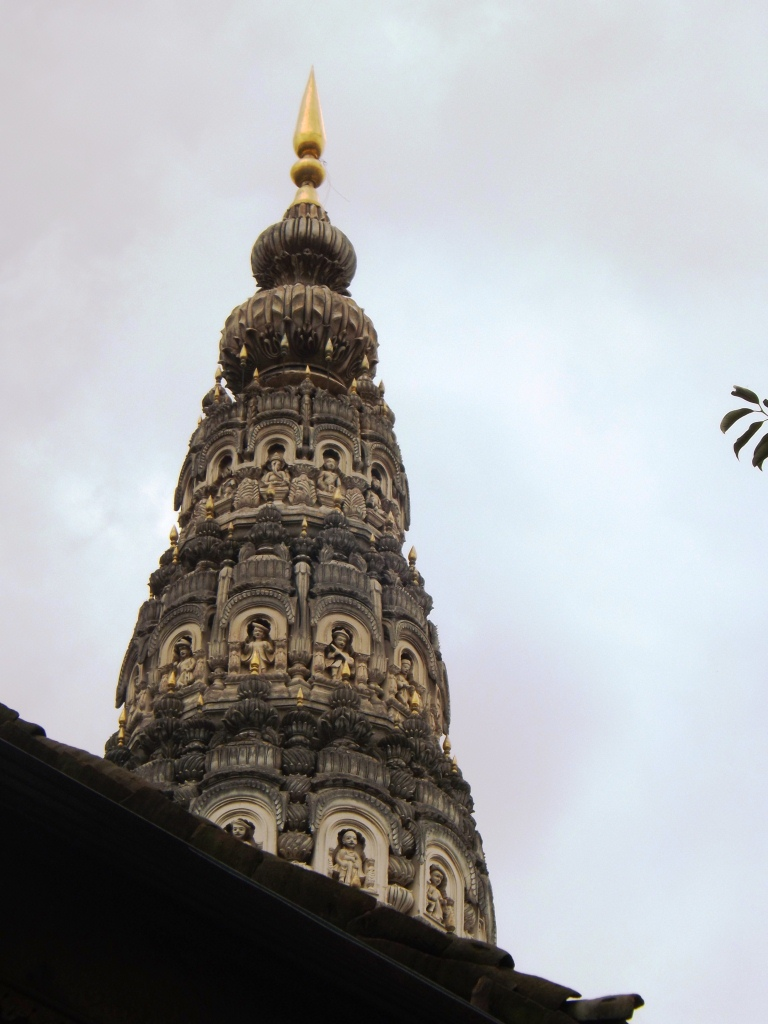
Tulshibaug Ram temple spire

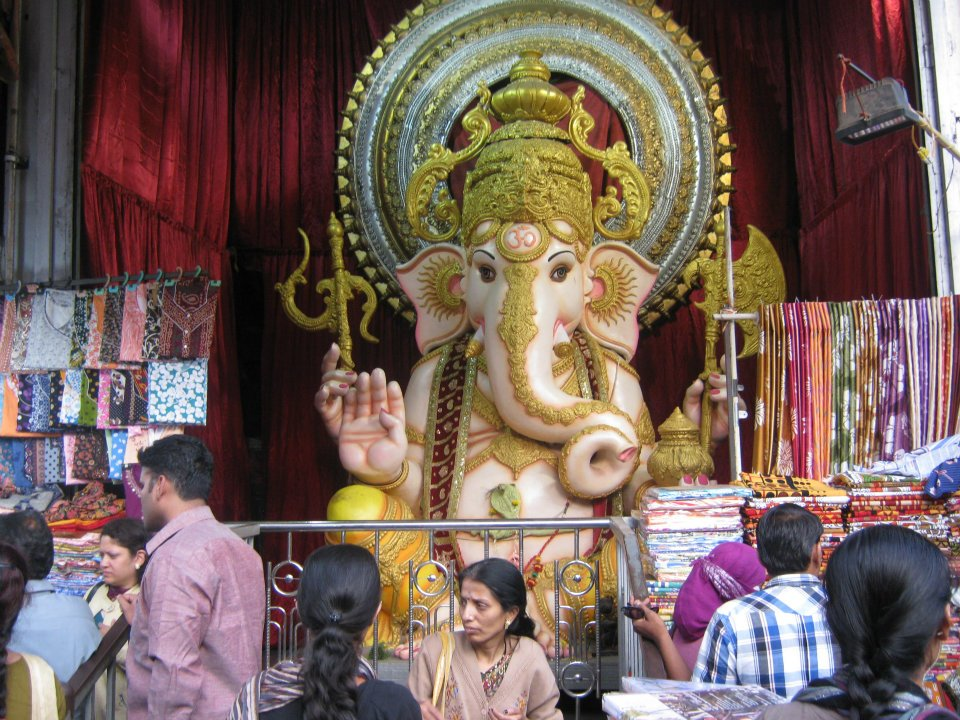
Tulshibaug Ganapati

Tulshibaug gets its name from the Tulshibaug wada located in this area, which is a famous temple of Lord Ram, Ganpati and Shankar.

The Tulshibaug Ram Temple was built during the Peshwa era, after the battle of Panipat in 1761, under Naro Appaji Khire (Tulshibaugwale) (1700-1775), the Subhedar of Pune. Work commenced in 1763 and was completed in 1795 at a cost of Rs 136,667 and it covers an area of about an acre. In 1884 Nandram Naik completed work on the spire (shikhar) and the Sabhamandap. The temple is managed by Shree Ramji Saunsthan.

The statues of Lord Ram, Sita, and Laxmana, made by Umajibaba Pandharpurkar, were placed in the sanctum of the temple in November 1765. In 1767, the statue of Lord Hanuman, crafted by Bakhatram Patharvat Gujrathi, was placed in the sanctum. Later in 1781 statues of Ganapati and Parvati were brought to the temple. Ornaments in gold, silver, pearls and diamonds were made for these statues.

Apart from the Ram Temple, there are many other temples in the precinct. These include the temples of Ganesh, Vitthal and Rukmini, Dattatray and Maruts. Lord Ganesh here is called Moreshwar and Lord Shiva is known as Tribakeshwar or Kashivishveshwar. Right in front of the Ram Temple is a small temple of Hanuman. The idol is made of black stone showing Hanuman joining his palms in order to bow down before Ram.

To the north of the Ram temple, a large wada was built that would serve as a residence for the heirs to Naro Appaji.

=== Conservation ===
Very few spaces and buildings of the Peshwa era survive in Pune today; however, the Ram Mandir precinct is largely intact. Architectural features of interest include woodwork, stonework, and lime stucco-work, in addition to a heritage of urban design over two centuries. It is relatively free of noise pollution. Today, a trade in sculpture, paintings and craftwork is carried on.

In September 2009, work began on a three-year restoration project sponsored by the Shree Ramji Sansthan Tulshibaug Trust.

== The market ==
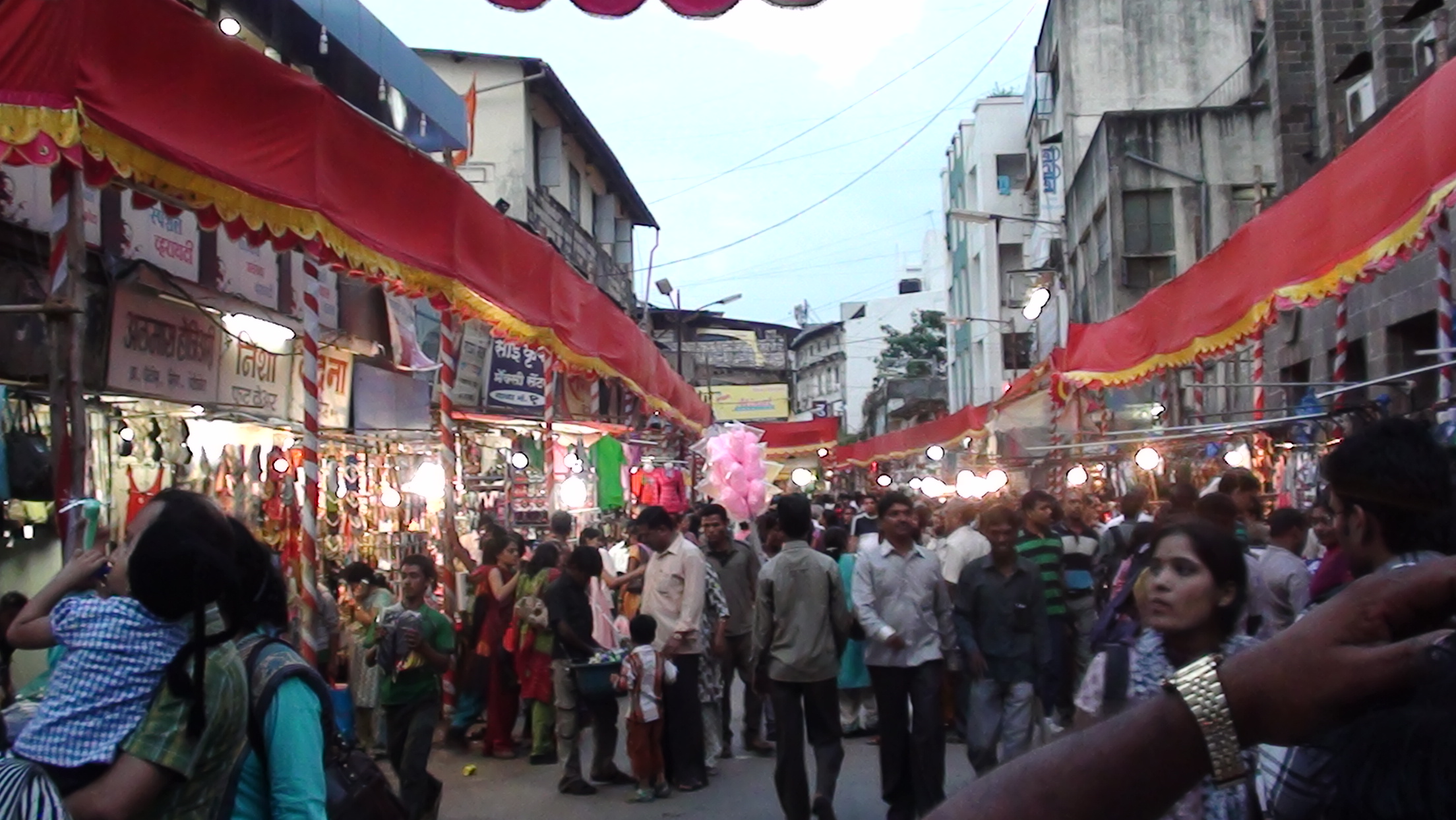
Tulshibaug market

The busy Tulshibaug market is located in front of the famous Vishrambaug Wada. The market sells goods including traditional Maharashtrian cooking items, cosmetics, jewelry and household goods, as well as Puja items. Other than shopping the market offers various refreshments and hotels.
