= Sadavali, Mawal =

Village in Maharashtra

Sadavali
- Village
- Location in Maharashtra, India Sadavali (India)
- Country: India
- State: Maharashtra
- District: Pune
- Tehsil: Mawal

Government
  - Type: Panchayati Raj
  - Body: Gram panchayat

Area
  - Total: 398.74 ha (985.3 acres)

Population (2011)
  - Total: 590
  - Density: 150/km^{2} (380/sq mi)
- Sex ratio 307 / 283 ♂/♀

Languages
  - Official: Marathi
  - Other spoken: Hindi
- Time zone: UTC+5:30 (IST)
- Website: pune.nic.in

Sadavali is a village in India, situated in the Mawal taluka of Pune district in the state of Maharashtra. It encompasses an area of 398.74 ha (985 acres).

== Administration ==
The village is administrated by a sarpanch, an elected representative who leads a gram panchayat. At the time of the 2011 Census of India, the gram panchayat governed two villages and was based at Shivane.

== Demographics ==
At the 2011 census, the village comprised 93 households. The population of 590 was split between 307 males and 283 females.

== See also ==
- List of villages in Mawal taluka
