= Sadashiv Peth, Pune =

Human settlement in Pune, India

Coordinates: 18°30′29.33″N 73°50′10.13″E

Sadashiv Peth is an area located in Pune, Maharashtra. It was founded by Madhavrao I in honour of Sadashivrao Bhau. It was initially planned for the military and laid out in squares with broad streets.

Sadashiv Peth is predominantly occupied by Maharashtrian Brahmins, especially Deshastha Brahmins and Chitpavan Brahmins, with a fair share of some other classes as well. Educational institutions like Bhave High School, New English School, Renuka Swaroop School, Jnana Prabodhini Prashala, D.E.S school, SPM English School are located here. Sadashiv Peth has many temples like Khunya Muralidhar, Joshi Narsimha Mandir, Junnarkar Datta Mandir, Upashi Vitthal, Shani Par, Nagnath Par, Chimnya Ganapati, Umbrya Ganpati, Bhikardas Maruti Mandir, Paranjape Shani Mandir. Many historic wadas like Vishrambaug Wada, Vinchurkar Wada, etc. are situated in Sadashiv Peth, which is also home to the Bharat Itihas Sanshodak Mandal, Geeta Dharma Mandal, Bharat Natya Mandir and Tilak Smarak Mandir.

Sarasbaug, Peshwe Park and Maharana Pratap Udyan are the famous parks located in Sadashiv Peth.

It has traditional Maharashtrian cuisine restaurants. It falls under the Kasba Peth constituency and its current legislator is Hemant Rasane, BJP.
