= Donje, Maharashtra =

Village in Maharashtra

Donje
- Village
- Location in Maharashtra, India Donje (India)
- Coordinates: 18.40°N 73.76°E
- Country: India
- State: Maharashtra
- District: Pune district

Languages
  - Official: Marathi
- Time zone: UTC+5:30 (IST)
- PIN: 411042

Donje is a village in the Haveli taluka of Pune district in Maharashtra State, India. Tanaji Malusare Path (Sinhagad Road), which starts at Sarasbaug junction, terminates at Sinhagad Fort or Paitha at Donje village. It is at a distance of 30 km from Pune city and 5 km from Khadakwasla Dam.
