= Shivane, Maval =

Village in Maharashtra

Shivne
- Semi -urban
- Location in Maharashtra, India Shivne (India)
- Coordinates: 18.4628952°N 73.7739852°E
- Country: India
- State: Maharashtra
- District: Pune
- Tehsil: Haveli

Government
  - Type: Panchayati Raj
  - Body: Gram panchayat

Area
  - Total: 714 ha (1,760 acres)

Population (2011)
  - Total: 2,067
  - Density: 289/km^{2} (750/sq mi)
- Sex ratio 1053 / 1014 ♂/♀

Languages
  - Official: Marathi
  - Other spoken: Hindi
- Time zone: UTC+5:30 (IST)
- Telephone code: 02114
- ISO 3166 code: IN-MH
- Vehicle registration: MH-12
- Website: pune.nic.in

Shivane is a village and gram panchayat in India, situated in the Haveli taluka of Pune district in the state of Maharashtra. It encompasses an area of 714 ha (1,764 acres).

== Administration ==
The village is administrated by a sarpanch, an elected representative who leads a gram panchayat. At the time of the 2011 Census of India, the village was the headquarters for the eponymous gram panchayat, which also governed the village of Sadavali.

== Demographics ==
At the 2011 census, the village comprised 384 households. The population of 2067 was split between 1053 males and 1014 females.

== See also ==
- List of villages in Mawal taluka
