= Dhayari =

Coordinates: 30°47′N 77°17′E

Dhayari Dhayari
- Suburb
- Interactive map of Dhayari
- Country: India
- State: Maharashtra
- District: Pune

Government
  - Body: Pune Municipal Corporation

Languages
  - Official: Marathi
- Time zone: UTC+5:30 (IST)
- PIN: 411 041
- Vehicle registration: MH-12

Dhayari is a southern suburb of Pune, Maharashtra, India,

== Geography ==
Dhayari is located at the intersection of Sinhagad Road and NH4 (Mumbai-Bangalore National Highway) in Pune city. It is one of the prime locations of Pune City as it is close to many important places of Pune. It is 8–9km from Swargate, 7–8km from Deccan, Fergusson College Road & Jangli Maharaj Road. It is around 20km from Hinjawadi IT Park. It is close to NH4 and an within easy reach of Warje and Chandani Chowk. It is green and surrounded by hills. 5km to its west is the Khadakwasla reservoir. Sinhagad fort is 20km from Dhayari. Dhayari is an upcoming residential area of Pune suburbs. Pune city ring road will pass through Dhayari. It is 13km from Pune Railway Station. Due to its location, Dhayari is a connecting point between Sinhagad fort and Pune. Symphony IT park is located near Dhayari. DSK Vishwa, Majestique Venice and Nanded City are major residential societies in Dhayari.

== Transport ==
There are frequent buses from Swargate to Dhayari, the main buses running between Dhayari & Swargate are [Dhayari Maruti Mandir]. Within Dhayari, there are buses to DSK Vishwa. A Dhayari-Hadapsar Gadital corridor is planned for a Pune bus rapid transit (BRT) route.Bus service from Dhayari to Wagholi has started recently as well as other destinations are added now.

The closest railway station is the Pune railway station approximately 13 km.

The closest bus station is the Pune Swargate bus station. approx 9 km.

Swargate-Khadakwasla Metro is also proposed.

== Medical facilities ==
Medical facilities within the Dhayari area include:

- Smt. Kashibai Navale Medical College & General Hospital, Narhe
- Deenanath Mangeshkar Hospital, Erandwane
- Cipla Foundation for Cancer, Warje.
- Mai Mangeshkar Hospital, Warje.
- Vinayak Hospital, Warje.
- Lodha Hospital

Even Sinhagad Road, has many Hospital & Nursing rooms available within 5-10 Km range.

== See also ==
- Dhayreshwar Mahadev
- Ambai Dara
- Pune
- List of neighbourhoods in Pune
- Bhooj Adda Bengali Restaurant in Pune
