= Punawale =

- Neighbourhood
- Location in Maharashtra, India
- Coordinates: 18°37′52.32″N 73°44′19.61″E
- Country: India
- State: Maharashtra
- City: Pune
- Elevation: 575 m (1,886 ft)
- Demonym(s): Punekar, Puneri

Languages
  - Official: Marathi & English
- Time zone: UTC+5:30 (IST)
- PIN: 411033
- Vehicle registration: MH 14, MH 12
- Governing Body: Pimpri Chinchwad Municipal Corporation, Pune

Punawale is a fast developing suburb of Pimpri-Chinchwad. Punawale is 5 minutes distance from Pune Mumbai expressway.

Located close to Hinjawadi and its growing IT Park as well as the Pune Mumbai Expressway, Punawale has now emerged as the location of choice for home buyers from the Information Technology.

Punawale is also near Wakad and benefits from convenient access to various hospitals, schools and shopping malls.

== History ==
Punawale was an underdeveloped village. Prior to its development, most of the inhabitants were poor peasants practicing agriculture and wood carving, deprived of basic public services. From the late 1990s, the village grew and caught up with the vast industrialization and expansion of the nearby Pune city. The introduction of IT Park near Hinjawadi sparked a tremendous real estate growth in the region.

== Transportation ==
Punawale is well connected to the rest of the city by public transportation. PMPML buses shuttle across the area frequently, connecting it with other areas of the city. Sharing / private Auto Rickshaws and cabs are also available.

== Education ==
Some primary and Pre-primary schools affiliated to Maharashtra state board have been developed in this locality in the past few years. Many schools affiliated to national education boards — ICSE and CBSE have been established within the area. Some Preschools have also been developed in Punawale, such as the Colours Preschool.
