= Ravet, Raigarh =

Ravet is a village in Raigarh district, Maharashtra, India.

== Demographics ==
Per the 2011 census, Ravet has a total population of 503 people, of whom 236 are male and 267 female. Ravet village is located in Alibag Tehsil of Raigarh district in Maharashtra, India. It is situated 21 km away from sub-district headquarter Alibag and 26 km away from district headquarter Alibag. As per 2009 stats, Kusumbale is the gram panchayat of Ravet village.
