= Mahatma Phule Krishi Vidyapeeth =

Agricultural university in Maharashtra, India

Coordinates: 19.349104°N 74.646106°E

- महात्मा फुले कृषी विद्यापीठ
- Motto: Sanskrit: अन्नं बहु कुर्वीत तद् व्रतम्
- Motto in English: "We vow to produce abundant food"
- Type: Public
- Established: 29 March 1968 (58 years ago)
- Affiliations: UGC, NAAC, AIU, ICAR
- Chancellor: Governor of Maharashtra
- Vice-Chancellor: Dr. Vilas Kharche
- Location: Rahuri, Maharashtra, India
- Campus: Rural
- Website: mpkv.ac.in

Established on March 29, 1968 Mahatma Phule Krishi Vidyapeeth, Rahuri' (M.P.K.V.) is Maharashtra's first state agriculture university, which became operational from October 1969. Headquartered in Rahuri, Ahilyanagar district (formerly Ahmednagar), with jurisdiction across 10 districts of western Maharashtra. It has an area of 4762.14 hectares of which 3739.1 hectares are dedicated to farm cultivation; while the remaining 1,022.43 hectares serve administrative and infrastructure purposes. The university's primary mandates include: i) Education: Providing comprehensive agricultural education and degree programs.

ii) Research: Conducting advanced research within the agricultural sector. Developing and supplying high-quality seeds and planting materials.

iii) Extension: Facilitating technology transfer through farmer training and extension services.

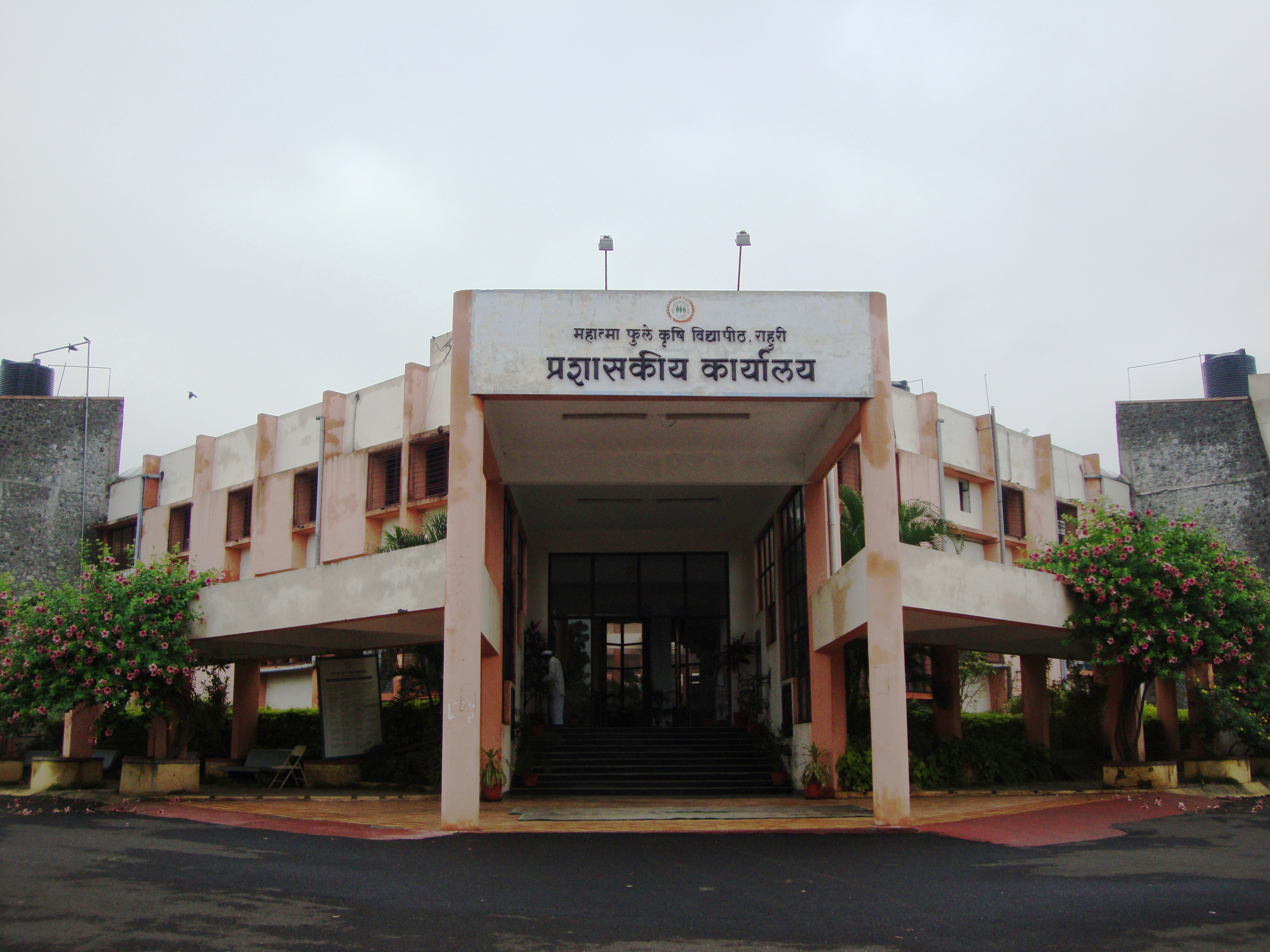
Main Administrative Building of Mahatma Phule Krishi Vidyapeeth

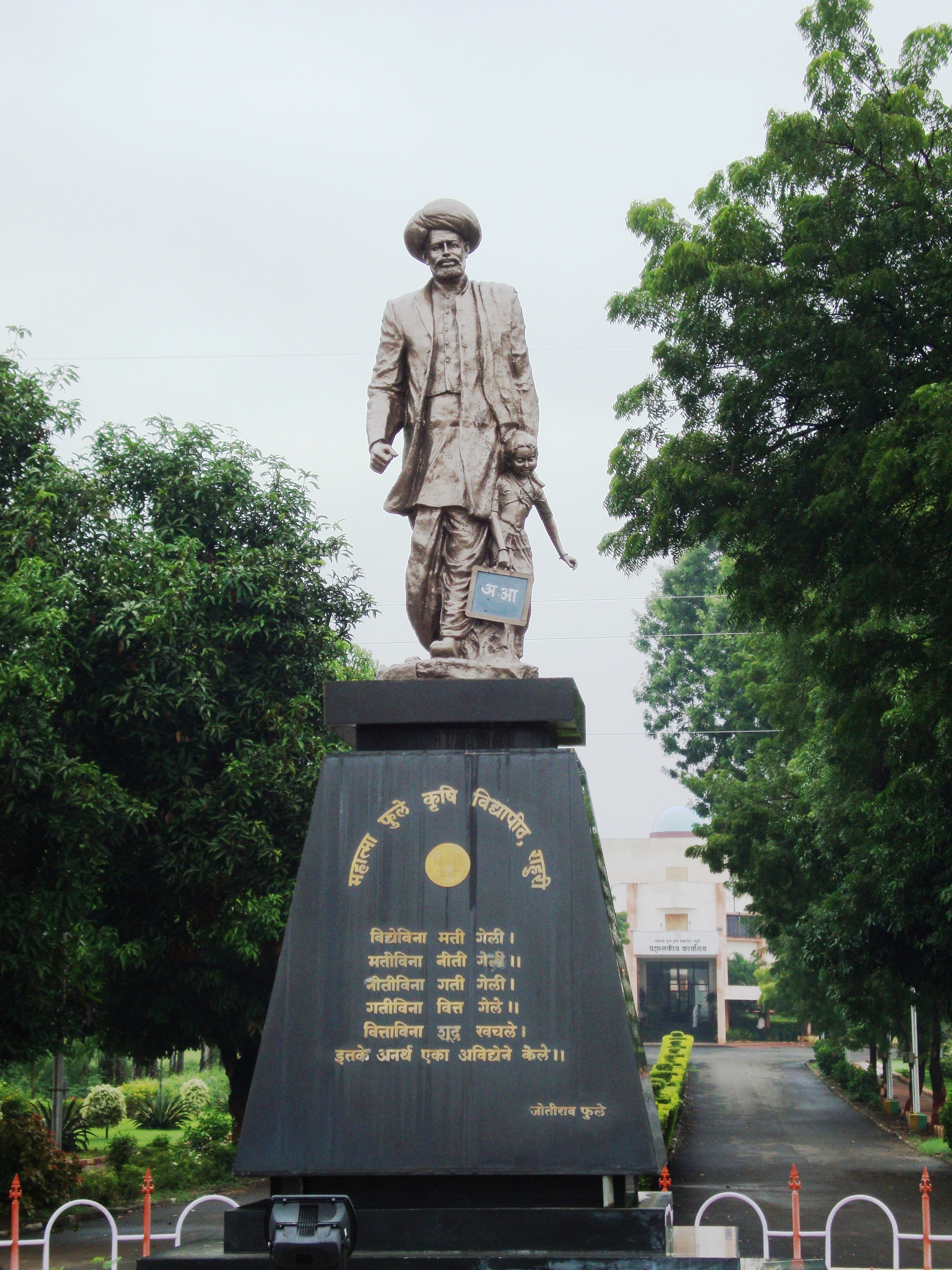
Statue of Mahatma Phule at the entrance

== Academics-education ==
The MPKV has an educational mandate to provide Diploma, Undergraduate (UG), Postgraduate (PG), and Doctorate (Ph.D.) level quality education in agriculture and allied fields for skill development and to produce competent human resources . It offers Bachelor's degree programs in Agriculture, Horticulture, Agricultural Engineering, and Food Technology. Business Management, Biotechnology, Animal Husbandry, Diploma in Agriculture, and Agril. Polytechnics; Master's degree programme in 21 disciplines of Agriculture and 03 disciplines in Agriculture Engineering, and Doctoral degree programme in 18 disciplines of Agriculture and 04 disciplines of Agriculture Engineering.

Faculty of Agricultural Science consists of various 15 departments, viz., Agricultural Botany (with four subdisciplines viz. Genetics and Plant Breeding, Plant Physiology, Seed Science and Technology; Molecular Biology and Biotechnology), Agricultural Economics, Agricultural Engineering, Agricultural Entomology, Agricultural Extension & Communication, Agricultural Meteorology, Agronomy, Animal Husbandry and Dairy Science, Biochemistry, Food Science and Technology, Horticulture, Interfaculty Department of Irrigation Water Management, Plant Pathology and Agricultural Microbiology, Soil Science and Agricultural Chemistry and Statistics.

=== Undergraduate level constituent colleges ===
The university has 15 constituent Government colleges with a total UG intake capacity of 1104 students. It includes 8 Agriculture Colleges, 2 Agricultural Engineering Colleges, 2 Horticulture Colleges, and 1 college each of ABM and Food Tech, with their details as given below.

1. Post Graduate Institute, Rahuri (Central campus) : The Post Graduate Institute of Mahatma Phule Krishi Vidyapeeth, Rahuri was established in the year 1972 exclusively to impart Post-Graduation Degree to Agricultural graduates. Before 1972, PG Degree Programme of the university was run at the College of Agriculture, Pune affiliated to the University of Poona, offering Bachelor's and Master's degrees in Agriculture. In 1972, the postgraduate degree programme was transferred from Pune to Rahuri and the institute started functioning at the basic science building at the university's central campus. In the year 1979-80, the functioning of PG programme started in the present building of the Post Graduate Institute. It offers Masters degree in 21 disciplines of Agriculture and Doctoral degree in 17 disciplines of Agriculture
2. College of Agriculture, Pune (); The College of Agriculture, Pune is one of the first five agricultural colleges established in India. It has an intake capacity is 190 for B.Sc. Hons. (Agri.) and 54 for PG degree. Initially started in 1908 and was shifted to a building (Now the Old College building) in 1911. In 1969, the College was transferred to the Mahatma Phule Krishi Vidyapeeth, Rahuri on its establishment. On the Centenary, a New Building was constructed and the College was shifted to it.
3. College of Agriculture, Dhule ; The College of Agriculture in Dhule was initially established in 1960 with affiliation to Pune University. Initially, it served the North Maharashtra's Khandesh region, including the districts of Dhule, Jalgaon, Nasik, and Nandurbar. The college spans a total of 242.73 hectares, with 180.47 hectares (74.35%) under cultivation. It has an intake capacity is 128 for B.Sc. Hons. (Agri.) and 54 for PG degree.
4. Rajarshee Chhatrapati Shahu Maharaj College of Agriculture, Kolhapur : Initially established at Kasaba Bawada on 30 June 1963, it was shifted to its present location at Old Pune-Bangalore Highway in 1968. This College encompasses a total area of about 131.38 hectares, out of which 85.55 hectares are available at the main campus. It has an intake capacity is 190 for B.Sc. Hons. (Agri.) and 54 for PG degree.
5. College of Agriculture Nandurbar : It has an intake capacity of 60 students for B.Sc. Hons. (Agri.) degree, out of which 80% seats are reserved for Scheduled Tribe students.. This college was established on 1 August 2018 with a focus on providing agricultural education to tribal students, to increase their involvement in farming and allied activities.
6. College of Agriculture, Karad : The Government of Maharashtra sanctioned the College of Agriculture, Karad, on the occasion of the celebration of the birth centenary year of the Late Hon. Chief Minister Shri. Yashwantrao Chavan in 2011. It has an intake capacity of 60 students for B.Sc. Hons. (Agri.) degree. .
7. College of Agriculture, Muktainagar ; It has an intake capacity of 60 students for B.Sc. Hons. (Agri.) degree The college was sanctioned in the Year 2015.
8. Punyashlok Ahilyadevi Holkar College of Agriculture, Halgaon- Ahilyanagar : This college was started in the Year 2018-19 with an intake capacity of 60 students for B.Sc. Hons. (Agri.) degree.
9. College of Agriculture, Kashti-Malegaon, Nashik : It has an intake capacity of 60 students for B.Sc. Hons. (Agri.) degree
10. Dr. Annasaheb Shinde College of Agricultural Engineering & Technology, Rahuri Dr. Annasaheb Shinde College of Agricultural Engineering, Rahuri : It has an intake capacity of 64 students for B.Tech. (Agriculture Engineering) degree. In addition, it offers Master's degree programs in 3 disciplines and Doctoral degree programs in 4 disciplines of Agricultural Engineering.
11. College of Agricultural Engineering & Technology, Kashti-Malegaon: It has an intake capacity of 40 students for B.Tech. (Agriculture Engineering) degree.
12. College of Horticulture, Pune; It has an intake capacity of 34 students for B.Sc. Hons. (Hort.) degree.
13. College of Horticulture, Kashti-Malegaon, Nashik: It has an intake capacity of 60 students for B.Sc. Hons. (Hort.) degree.
14. College of Agricultural Business Management, Kashti-Malegaon, Nashik : It has an intake capacity of 60 students for B.Sc. Hons. (ABM) degree
15. College of Food Technology, Kashti-Malegaon, Nashik: It has an intake capacity of 40 students for B.Tech. (Food Technology) degree.

=== Undergraduate affiliated colleges ===
Apart from this, 66 unaided colleges are affiliated to this university, run by various voluntary cooperative/ private / NGO organizations, offering seven Undergraduate degree programmes. B.Sc. (Hons) Agriculture is offered by 34 affiliated colleges with their total intake capacity of 3420 students. six affiliated Horticulture colleges have an intake capacity of 360 B.Sc. (Hons) students, four affiliated Colleges have an intake capacity of 300 B.Tech. (Biotechnology)students, B.Tech. (Food Technology) offered by five affiliated colleges with an intake capacity of 320 students, B. Tech. (Agril. Engg.) being offered by nine affiliated colleges with an intake capacity of 480 students, and B.Sc. (Hons) AMB being offered by eight affiliated colleges with an intake capacity of 600 students.

=== Master's level ===
The University offers Master's degree programs with a total intake of 309 students at Post-Graduate Institute, Rahuri, College of Agriculture, Pune, Kolhapur and Dhule; and Dr. A. S. College of Agricultural Engineering & Technology at Rahuri. Besides them an affiliated College at Baramati also offers PG degrees in 11 disciplines.

=== Doctoral Level ===
Further, the Post Graduate Institute (intake capacity of 66 M.Sc. students in agricultural science ) , Dr. A. S. College of Agricultural Engineering & Technology (Total intake of 12 students in Agril. Engineering) offers the Doctoral level programmes. College of Agriculture, Pune offers Ph.D. (Agri.) in Meteorology with an intake capacity of 2 students.

=== Diploma Level ===
Faculty of Lower Agricultural Education offers Diploma courses in Agriculture through 9 constituent and 76 unaided affiliated Agricultural Technical Schools to the university at present to provide trained manpower at the grass root level in Agriculture field ..

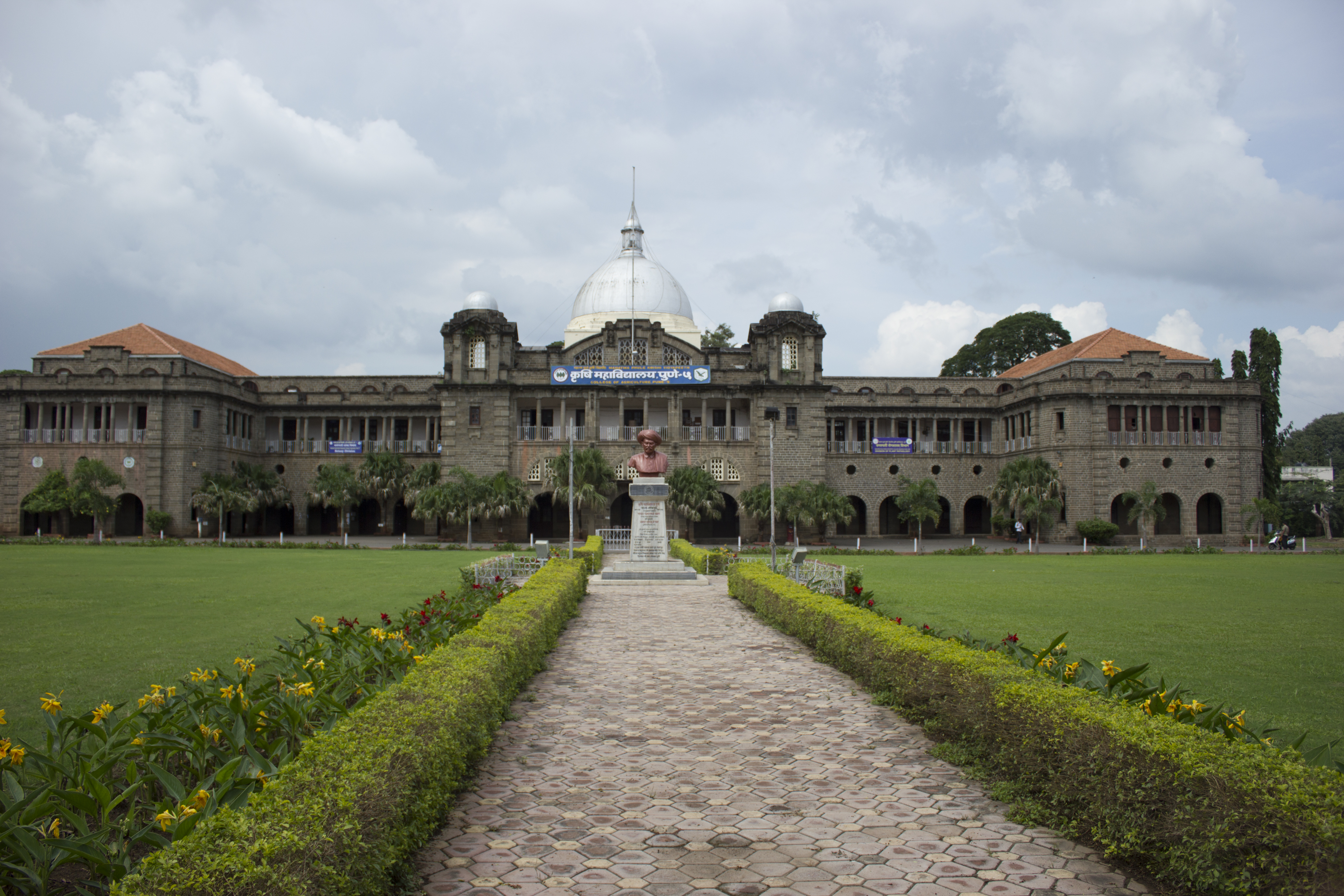
College of agriculture, Pune.

== Research ==
The university has a network of research stations spread over different agroclimatic zones. In all, there are 27 state-funded research stations, excluding the Central Campus, which comes under the Office of the Chief Scientist, Seed and Director, Farm. Besides them, there are 46 ICAR-AICRP centers under this university.

There are four Zonal Agricultural Research Stations located in four Agroclimatic Zones and 18 sub-Research Stations for verification of research work and to take up the research programmes. In addition to this, the State level Crop Specialists are there Oilseeds Specialist at Jalgaon, Sugarcane Specialist at Padegaon (Satara), Wheat Specialist at Niphad (Nashik), and Chief Soil Scientist at Solapur. At present, MPKV has 85 non-plan schemes funded by the State Govt.,45 AICRPs on different crops and plant sciences, and one centrally Sponsored Research Scheme.

The following is a list of 27 research stations (including four Zonal Agricultural Research Stations) with 85 non-plan State-funded schemes across 10 districts of Western Maharashtra.

Each ZARS for each zone has an Associate Director of Research to coordinate zonal activities.

1. Zonal Agricultural Research Station, Igatpuri Dist. Nashik
2. Zonal Agricultural Research Station, Shenda Park, Kolhapur
3. Zonal Agricultural Research Station, Ganeshkhind, Pune
4. Zonal Agricultural Research Station, Solapur
5. Central Sugarcane Research Station, Padegaon, Dist-Satara
6. Agriculture Research Station Niphad, Dist. Nashik
7. Oilseed Research Station, Jalgaon
8. Banana Research Station, Jalgaon
9. Agriculture Research Station Kasbe Digraj, Dist. Sangli
10. Agriculture Research Station, Savalvihir, Dist- Ahilyanagar
11. Agriculture Research Station, Chas, Dist- Ahilyanagar
12. Regional Sugarcane and Jaggery Research Station, Kolhapur
13. Agricultural Research Station, Vadgaon Maval, Dist-Pune
14. Agricultural Research Station, Karad, Dist-Satara
15. Agricultural Research Station, Lonavala Dist. Pune
16. Pulse and Oilseed Research and Training Center, Pandharpur, Dist-Solapur
17. Agriculture Research Station, Mohol Dist-Solapur
18. Agriculture Research Station, Jeur, District- Solapur
19. Agriculture Research Station, Dhule
20. Agriculture Research Station, Pimpalgaon Baswant, Dist. Nashik
21. Pomegranate Research and Technology Transfer Centre, Lakhmapur, Dist- Nashik
22. Regional Wheat Rust Research Station, Mahabaleshwar, Dist. Satara
23. Agricultural Research Station, Gadhinglaj, Dist- Kolhapur
24. Agricultural Research Station, Radhanagari, Dist. Kolhapur
25. Agriculture College Pune

The 46 ICAR-AICRP centers under MPKV are as listed below:

1. AICRP on Groundnut, Jalgaon
2. AICRP on Groundnut (Summer), Rahuri
3. AICRP on Sesamum, Jalgaon
4. AICRP on Banana, Jalgaon
5. AICRP on Fig and Custard Apple, Jadhavvadi, Dist-Pune
6. AICRP on Sugarcane, Padegaon
7. AICRP on Agrometerology, Solapur
8. AICRP on Safflower, Solapur
9. AICRP on Dryland Agriculture
10. AICRP on Potato, Pune
11. AICRP on Biocontrol, AC, Pune
12. AICRP on Mushroom, AC, Pune
13. AICRP on Floriculture, AC, Pune
14. AICRP on Wheat, Niphad
15. AICRP on Post-Harvest Technology
16. AICRP on Sugarcane
17. AICRP on Small Millet< Kolhapur
18. AICRP on Maize, Kolhapur
19. AICRP on Maize, Rahuri
20. AICRP on Wheat Rust, Mahabaleshar, Dist-Satara
21. AICRP on Niger, Igatpuri
22. AICRP on Network Project on Sheep (Farm Testing), Rahuri
23. AICRP on Medicinal & Aromatic Plants and Betelvine Research Project, Rahuri
24. AICRP on Goat Improvement, Rahuri
25. AICRP on Farm Implements & Machinery Rahuri
26. AICRP on Pesticide Residues, Dept. of Entomology, PGI, Rahuri
27. AICRP on Nematodes, Dept. of Entomology, PGI, Rahuri
28. AICRP on Breeder Seed Production –Field Crops (NSP), Rahuri
29. AICRP on Seed Tech. Research Unit, Rahuri
30. AICRP for Investigation on Soil Test Crop Response, Rahuri
31. AICRP on Forage Crops, Rahuri
32. AICRP on Vegetables, Rahuri
33. AICRP on Arid Zone Fruits, Rahuri
34. AICRP on Fruits, Rahuri
35. AICRP on Water Management, Rahuri
36. AICRP on Underutilized and Unexploited Plants, Rahuri
37. AICRP on Integrated Farming System, Rahuri
38. AICRP on Agroforestry, Rahuri
39. AICRP on Jute and Allied Fiber Crops, Rahuri
40. AICRP on Cotton (Irrigated), Rahuri
41. AICRP on Pigeonpea, Rahuri
42. AICRP on Chickpea, Rahuri
43. AICRP on Sorghum, Rahuri
44. Comprehensive Scheme for Studying the Cost of Cultivation of Principal Crops in Maharashtra

Besides these, there are research centres that work exclusively on funds from revenue receipts and externally funded ad-hoc projects.

1. State Level Biotechnology Center has been established at the Rahuri campus Centre started M.Sc. (Biotech.) degree programme
2. Medicinal and Aromatic Plants Project, Rahuri
3. Organic Farming Project
4. Gene Bank
5. Integrated Water Management department

== Extension ==
The M.P.K.V. Rahuri performs this pivotal activity by organizing both on-campus and off-campus (On farmers' fields) extension programs for the transfer of Agricultural technologies and collecting the farmers feedback. These extension programs include conducting Training programmes, FLDs, Farmers' Rallies, Field Visits, Diagnostic Team Visits, On-farm trials, Exhibitions, Field days etc. For this purpose, it has an extension network involving the following centres:

- Agricultural Technology Information Center (Central Campus, M.P.K.V., Rahuri) : The ATIC was started on 13 August 2001, as a single window delivery, technology dissemination, and supporting system. It has a Manager and four subject matter specialists (SMS) from the disciplines of Agronomy, Horticulture, Plant protection, and Animal husbandry, as well as a Dairy and Public Relations Officer (PRO).
- Regional Extension Centers (04) (Pune, Dhule, Kolhapur, Rahuri): Regional Extension Centers were established in the year 2002 to test and transfer the improved technology from time to time by leading at the Zonal Level, besides conducting their own District level extension activities. Three RECs were established at the constituent colleges, viz., Pune, Dhule, Kolhapur, and one at Central Campus, MPKV, Rahuri.
- District Extension Centers (05) They were established in the year 2002 to carry out district-level extension education activities effectively and efficiently in the 5 districts besides those having RECs. Five District Extension Centers (DECs) are located at different research stations, viz. Jalgaon, Padegaon (Satara), Solapur, Kasbe Digraj (Sangli), and Niphad (Nashik).
- Krishi Vigyan Kendras (17) : KVKs were developed for effectively testing and transferring agricultural technologies to bridge the gap between the production potential and the existing productivity, as well as to increase self-employment opportunities among the farming communities in adjoining areas. In total, there are 17 KVKs operational under the jurisdiction of the university, of which 4 are directly under the administrative control of the university, while the other 13 are run by NGOs and other voluntary cooperative or private organizations.

The constituent KVKs are as follows.

- Krishi Vigyan Kendra, Dhule
- Krishi Vigyan Kendra, Mohol, District Solapur
- Krishi Vigyan Kendra, Mamurabad Farm, Jalgaon
- Krishi Vigyan Kendra, Borgaon, District Satara

Affiliated voluntary KVKs are as follows.

- Krishi Vigyan Kendra, Babhaleshwar Dist. Ahilyanaagar (Pravara Institute of Research and Education in Natural and Social Sciences (PIRENS)
- Krishi Vigyan Kendra, Nashik (YCMOU)
- Krishi Vigyan Kendra (Farmers Science center), Baramati, Dist. Pune ( Pune - I ) Agricultural Development Trust): With an operational area in seven tehsils of the South-East part of Pune district.
- Krishi Vigyan Kendra, Kolde Dist. Nandurbar (Dr. Hedgewar Seva Samiti Indira Sadan)
- Krishi Vigyan Kendra, Kegaon, Dist. Solapur ( Solapur -I ) ( Shabari Krishi Pratishthan -SKP)
- Krishi Vigyan Kendra, Kalwade Dist. Satara ( Satara -I ) (Kalyani Gorakshan Trust)
- Krishi Vigyan Kendra, Kanchanpur, Taluka- Miraj, Dist. Sangli (Vasant Prakash Vikas Pratishthan's): Established in 1992, this KVK aims at assessment, refinement and demonstration of farm technology/ products.
- Krishi Vigyan Kendra, Pal Dist. Jalgaon ( Jalgaon - I ) (Satpuda Vikas Mandal, Pal)
- Krishi Vigyan Kendra, Narayangaon Dist. Pune ( Pune -II ) (Gramonnati Mandal) : It covers six tehsils of North Pune district, viz. Junnar, Ambegaon, Khed, Shirur, Maval, and Mulshi.
- Krishi Vigyan Kendra, Malegaon Dist. Nashik ( Nashik - II ): It is operational in seven tehsils of Nashik district, namely Satana, Malegaon, Kalwan, Deola Yeola Nandgaon and Surgana.
- Krishi Vigyan Kendra, Kanerimath, Dist. Kolhapur (Kolhapur -II) (Shri Siddhagiri Math): Jurisdiction areas of KVK are 6 tehsils of the Southern part of Kolhapur district namely, Karveer, Kagal, Gadhinglaj, Bhudargadh, Ajara & Chandgad.
- Krishi Vigyan Kendra, Dahigaon Dist. Ahilyanagar (Ahilyanagar -II) Seven tehsils of the Southern part of Ahilyanagar district, namely Ahilyanagar, Pathardi, Shevgaon, Newasa, Karjat, Jamkhed, and Shrigonda come under the jurisdiction of KVK Dahigaon.
- Krishi Vigyan Kendra, Talsande, Dist. Kolhapur (Kolhapur - I) (D. Y. Patil Education Society)

== Alumni ==
MPKV has alumni who include numerous Agricultural Research Service Scientists and government officers working for the state as well as the central government. It has given leaders in the field of politics, administration, and agricultural research and education, viz. Dr. Y.S. Nerkar, Dr. R.B. Deshmukh, Dr. T.A. More, Dr. P.G. Patil., Dr. S.R. Gadakh, Dr. V.K. Kharche etc.. Several scientists, alumni of M.P.K.V., Rahuri, have been elected as Fellows of the National Academy of Agricultural Sciences (NAAS) viz. Dr. Y.S. Nerkar (Ex-Vice Chancellor, MPKV), Dr. T.A. More (Ex-Vice Chancellor, MPKV), Dr. SE Pawar (BARC), Dr. S.S. Mehetre (Ex-Director, MPKV), Dr. J.V. Patil (Ex-Director, IIMR), Dr. Girdhari R. Patil (Ex-Joint Director at NDRI), Dr. Ramabhau T. Patil (Ex-Director, CIPHET) etc.

Some meritorious officers in Indian Administrative Service like Dadasaheb Zagade (IAS) Tanaji Satre (I.A.S), Prabhakar Deshmukh (I.A.S), Chandrakant Dalvi (I.A.S), Umakant Dangat (I.A.S), Shivaji Daund (I.A.S), Vikas Deshmukh (I.A.S), V.J Bhosale (I.A.S), Rajaram Mane (I.A.S), A.R Shinde (I.A.S), Shekhar Gaikwad (I.A.S) are notable alumni of MPKV. Apart from them, many alumni from MPKV are working in the State Public Services.
