= Rahuri =

- Town
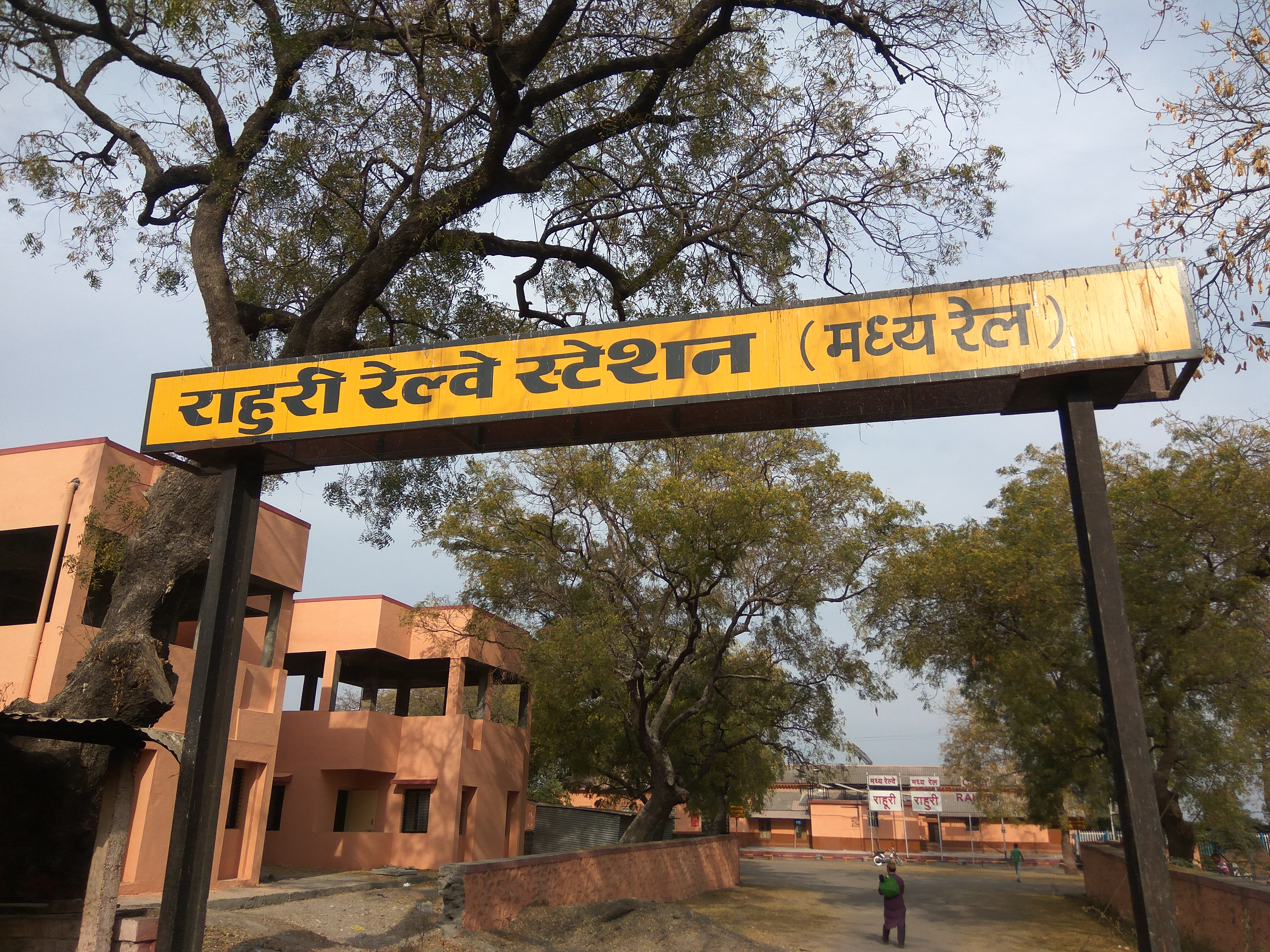
- Rahuri Railway Station

- Location in Maharashtra, India
- Coordinates: 19.38°N 74.65°E
- Country: India
- State: Maharashtra
- District: Ahmednagar
- Elevation: 511 m (1,677 ft)

Population (2011)
  - Total: 54,325

Languages
  - Official: Marathi
- Time zone: UTC+5:30 (IST)

Rahuri is a town and a municipal council in Ahilyanagar district in the Indian state of Maharashtra.

== Geography ==
Rahuri is located at 19.38°N 74.65°E. It has an average elevation of 511metres (1,676 feet).

== Demographics ==
As of 2001 India census, Rahuri had a population of 34,465. Males constituted of 52% of the population and females 48%. Rahuri has an average literacy rate of 70%, higher than the national average of 59.5%: male literacy is 77%, and female literacy is 63%. In Rahuri, 13% of the population is under 6 years of age.

== History ==
According to legend, the town was named Rahuri, after Rahu, a historical figure in Hinduism. It is believed that Rahu's head touched the ground at this place after it was beheaded by Mohini (Vishnu) from Newasa. Rahuri also has the second most important temple of the Hindu God Shani Dev.

== Universities and colleges ==
- Mahatma Phule Krishi Vidyapeeth

Dr. Annasaheb Shinde College of Agricultural Engineering, Rahuri
