= Vadgaon Khurd =

Village in Maharashtra

- suburb
- Country: India
- State: Maharashtra
- District: Pune

Vadgaon Khurd is a village on the fringes of Pune, Maharashtra, India.
