= Ravet, Pune =

Village in Maharashtra

Ravet
- Neighbourhood of Pune, Maharashtra
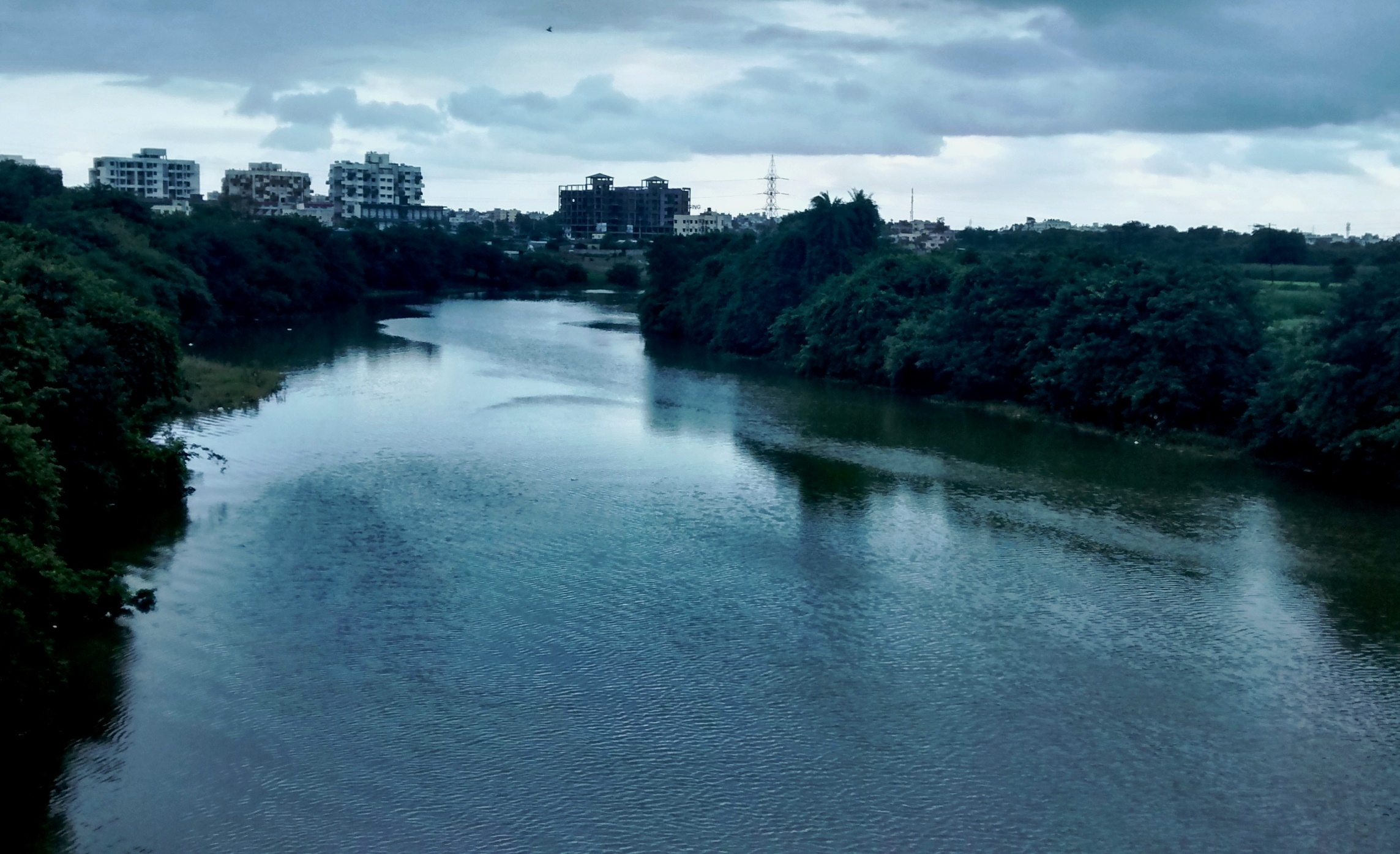
- The Pavana River flowing through Ravet

- Location within Maharashtra
- Coordinates: 18.6606°N 73.7322°E
- Country: India
- State: Maharashtra
- Time zone: UTC+5:30 (IST)

Ravet is a neighbourhood in the district of Pune, Maharashtra, India. It is located within Pimpri Chinchwad. The Pavana River helps form the southern border of the neighbourhood.

== Geography ==
Ravet is located at the intersection of Mumbai-Pune Expressway and Katraj-Dehu Bypass.

The Sant Tukaram Bridge on Pavana River is located at Ravet.

Nearby suburbs to Ravet are Pradhikaran, Walhekarwadi, Bijalinagar-Chinchwad, Punawale, Kiwale, Wakad and Dehu Road. PCMC is developing new gardens and internal roads too.

The Pavana River flows through Ravet.

== Demographics ==
The suburb mainly attracts floating student population and young IT professionals.

== Education ==
=== Education ===
The suburb has educational institutes such as sb patil school (PCCOE&R), D.Y. Patil Dnyanshanti School, S.B.Patil School, S.B. Patil Junior College & Symbiosis Skills Open University. On the border with Akurdi is D Y Patil International University

City Pride School & D.Y.Patil Dnyanshanti School are also located in Ravet.

== Hospitals ==
Bhole Children's Clinic is located in Ravet for to serve the children in area of Punawale, Ravet, Kiwale, Akurdi, Tathwade and Chinchwad.

== Economy ==
Akashraj One Mall is located in Ravet.

== Transport ==
Rainbow BRTS operates on Aundh-Ravet BRT Road since 2016. Nigdi to Mukai Chowk BRT will be operational from next year. Nearest railway station is Akurdi Railway Station.
