= Vishrambaug Wada =

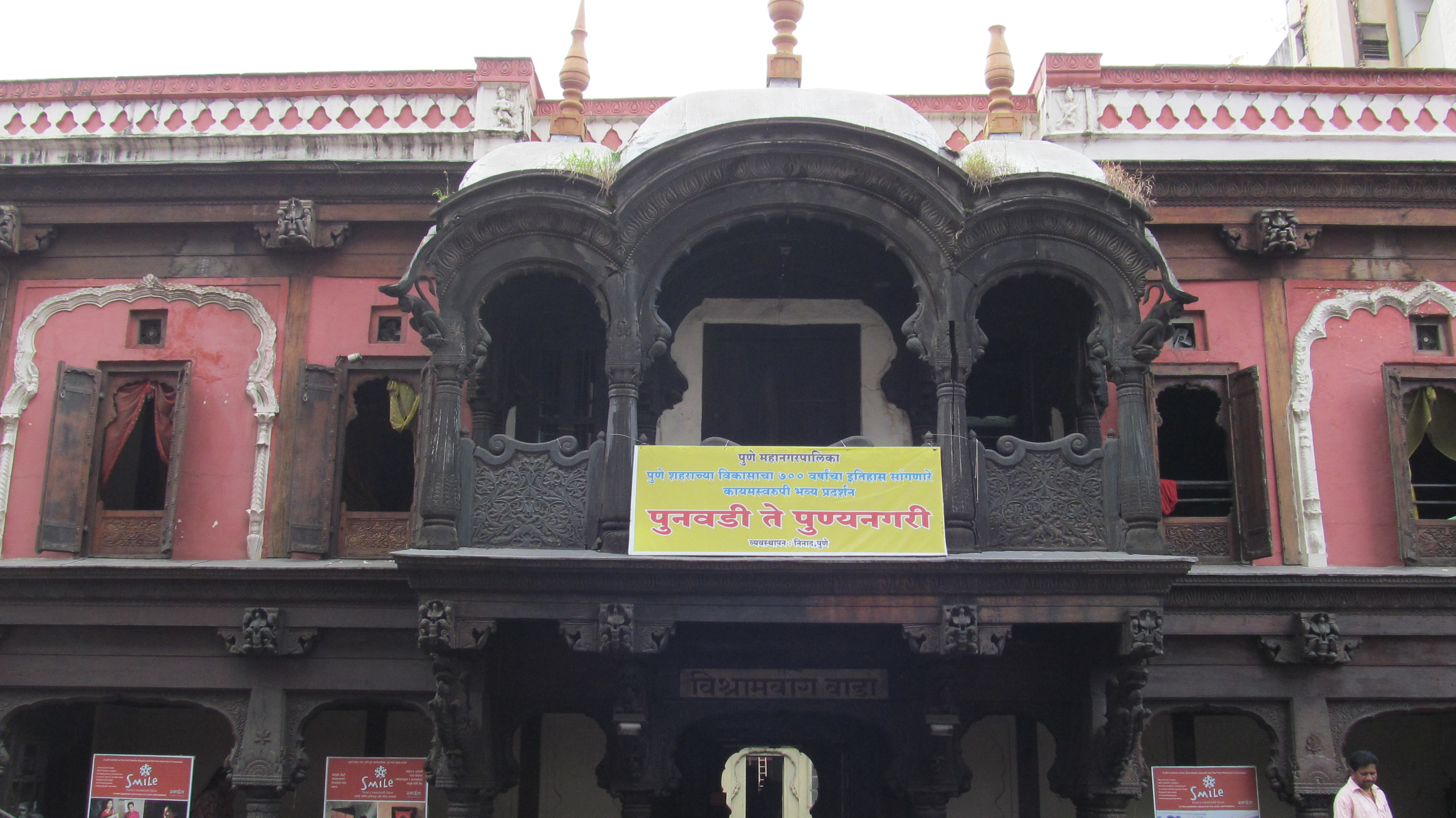
- Vishrambaug Wada front view

- Location within Maharashtra

General information
- Type: Wada
- Architectural style: Maratha Architecture
- Location: Pune, India
- Coordinates: 18°31′13″N 73°51′24″E
- Completed: 1807
- Owner: Pune Municipal Corporation

Technical details
- Structural system: Wood
- Size: 20,000 sq. ft

Vishrambaag Wada, a mansion situated at central Pune's Thorale Bajirao Road, was the residence of Peshwa Baji Rao II, the last Peshwa of Maratha confederacy, in early 19th century. The 20,000 sq.ft. wada presently houses a post office on its ground floor, a few other offices of the municipal corporation and a small museum of Maratha artifacts put together by noted Maratha historian, Babasaheb Purandare. This structure is famous for its fine entrance and the balcony with carved woodwork.

== History ==
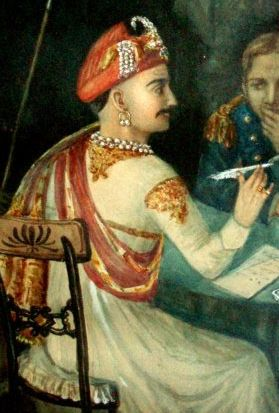
Baji Rao II

Vishrambaug Wada was built in 1807 AD at the price of Rs 200,000. It took six years to complete the construction. Baji Rao II preferred this residence to the ill-fated Shaniwar Wada, the citadel of the Peshwas. Baji Rao II stayed here for eleven years until his defeat in the Third Anglo-Maratha War. After the war the British exiled him with a pension to Bithur near Kanpur. His wife, Varanasibai stayed behind for a while before joining him in Bithur. Soon the British took over Pune.

In 1821, Sanskrit studies continued at the Wada under the East India Company at the college, the forerunner of the Poona college which became the Deccan College. A high school called Vishrambag High School was also established within the palace. In 1871, an act of arson destroyed the entire eastern wing of the Wada.

In 1930, the then Poona municipality bought the property from the colonial Bombay Presidency government for a sum of Rs 100,000. The Municipality and its successor, the Pune Municipal Corporation(PMC) offices were located at Vishrambaag Wada until 1959. Several PMC department offices were based in the wada until 2003.

== Restoration ==
The PMC has undertaken the restoration work of Vishrambaag Wada under the Heritage Corridor Plan. The conservation is set to be carried out in three phases, starting with the double storeyed mansion where the Peshwa is said to have lived with a battery of 6,000 servants.

According to PMC's heritage cell chief Shyam Dhavale, the original bricks wada, are specially being recreated. And so are some of the windows, wooden pillars and motifs.

Red tiles on the sloping roof and the courtyard—a typical feature of Maratha architecture—will be retained.

As of 2004, ₹2,500,000 (US$26,000) have been spent on the restoration work.

== Gallery ==
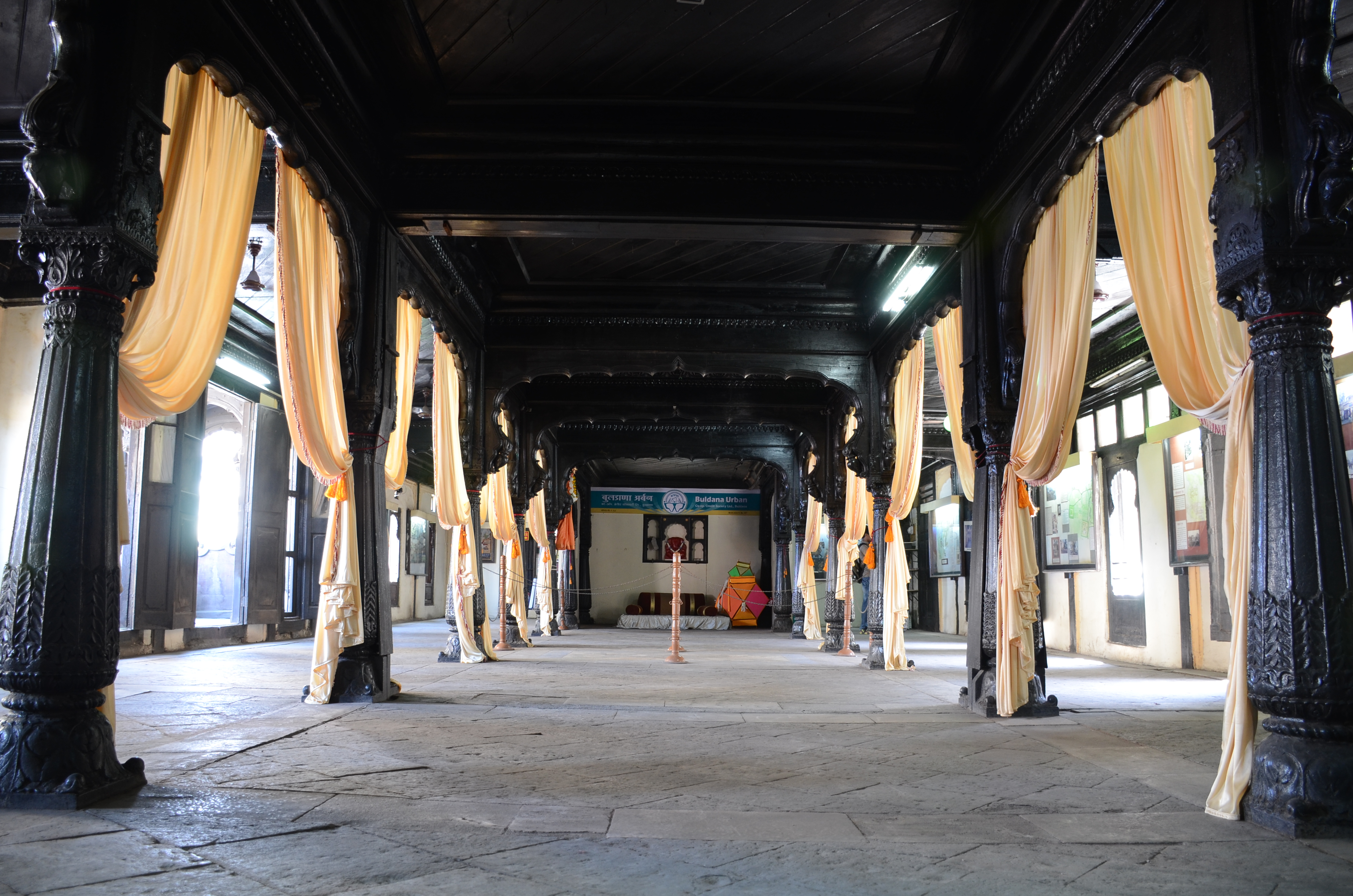
Main Hall

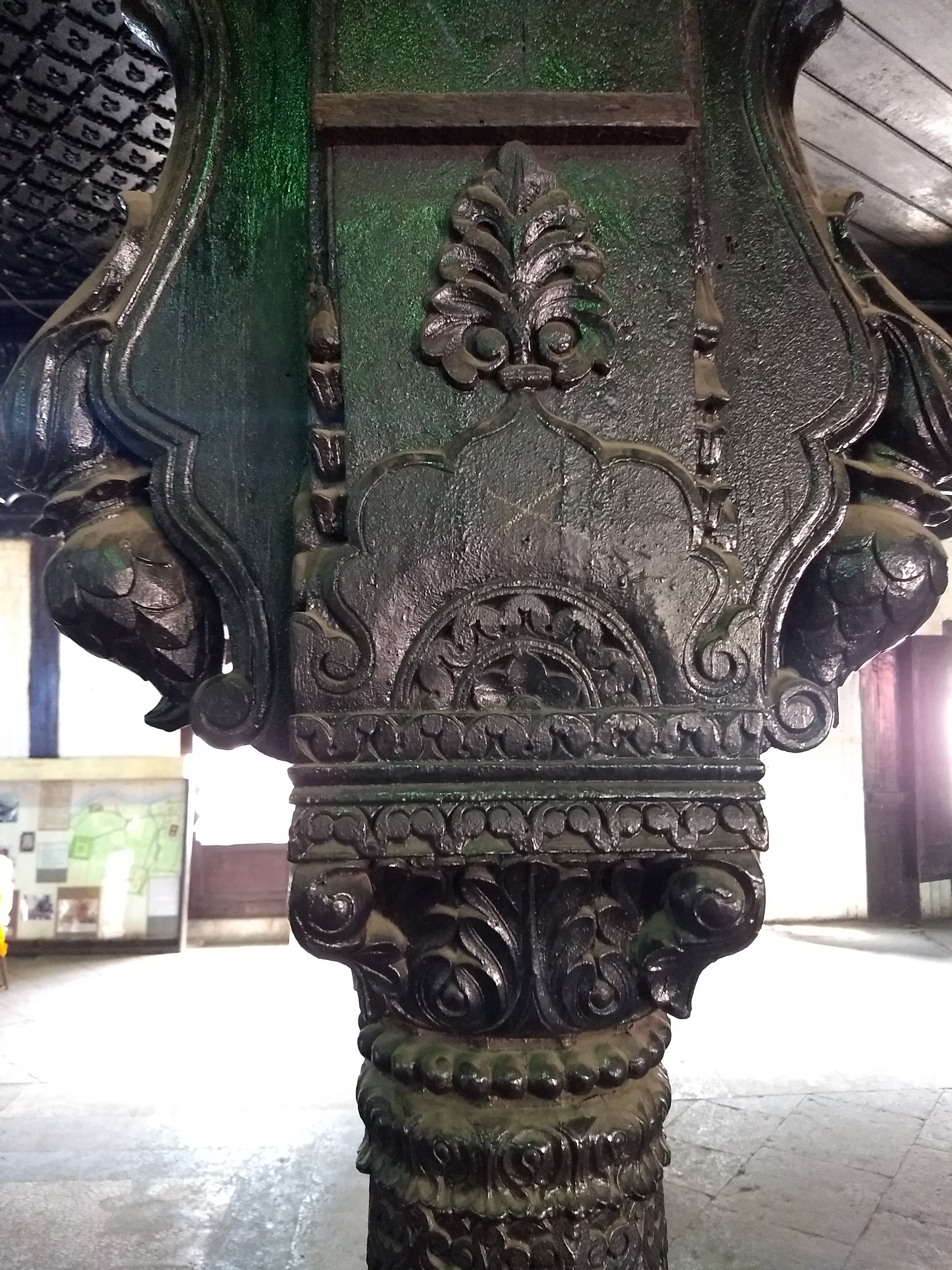
Wooden Carvings

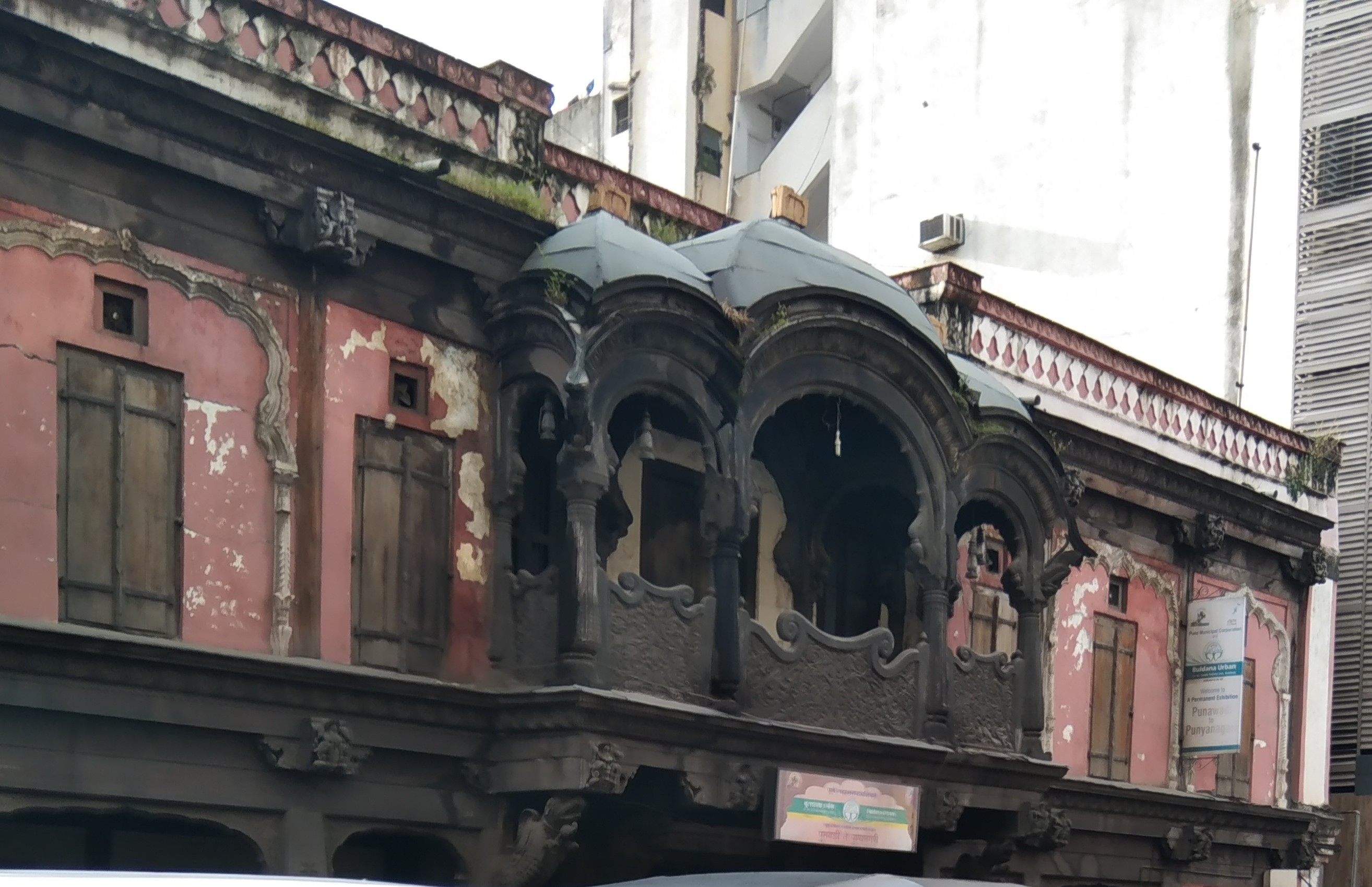
Balcony

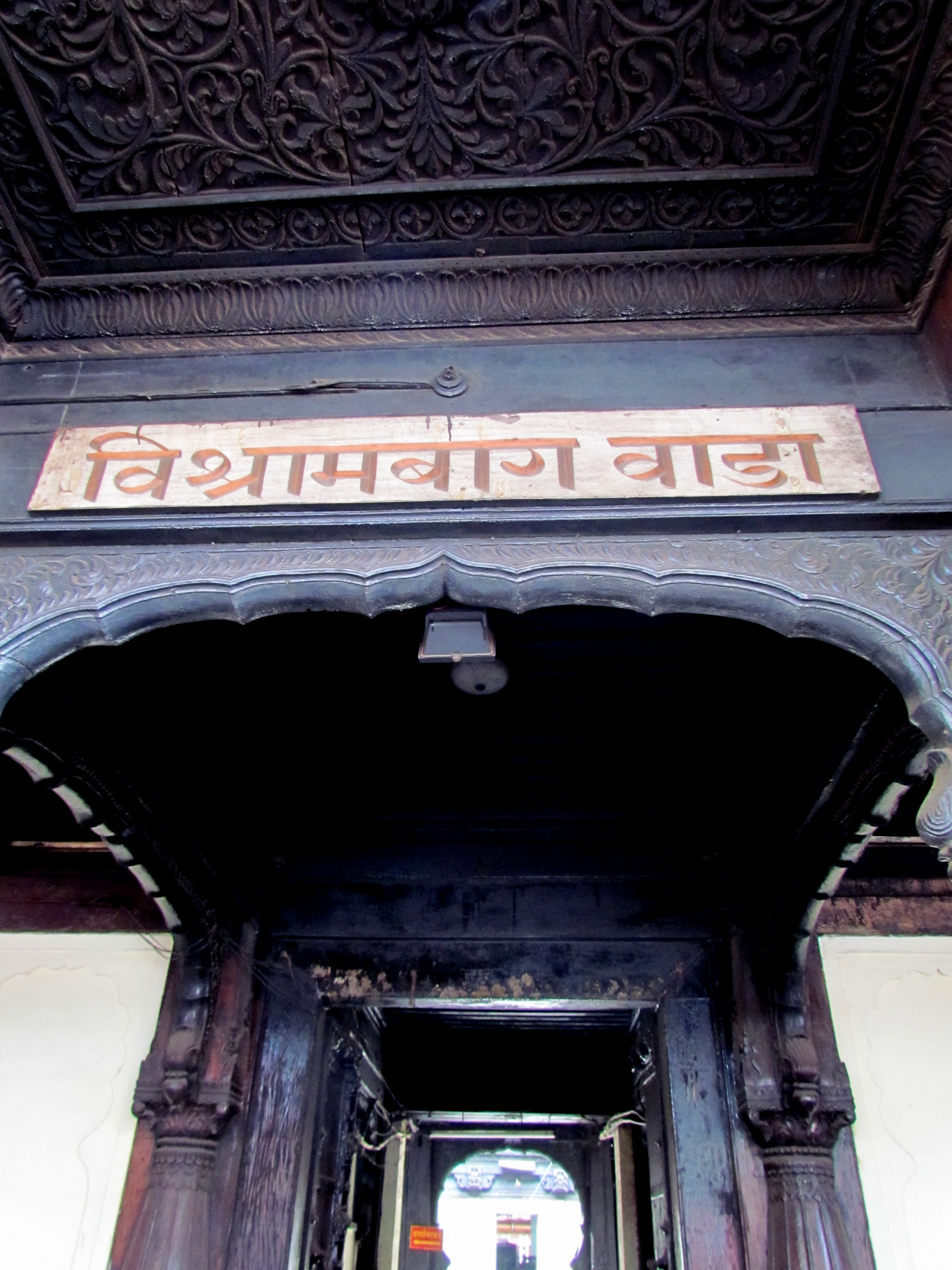
Front door

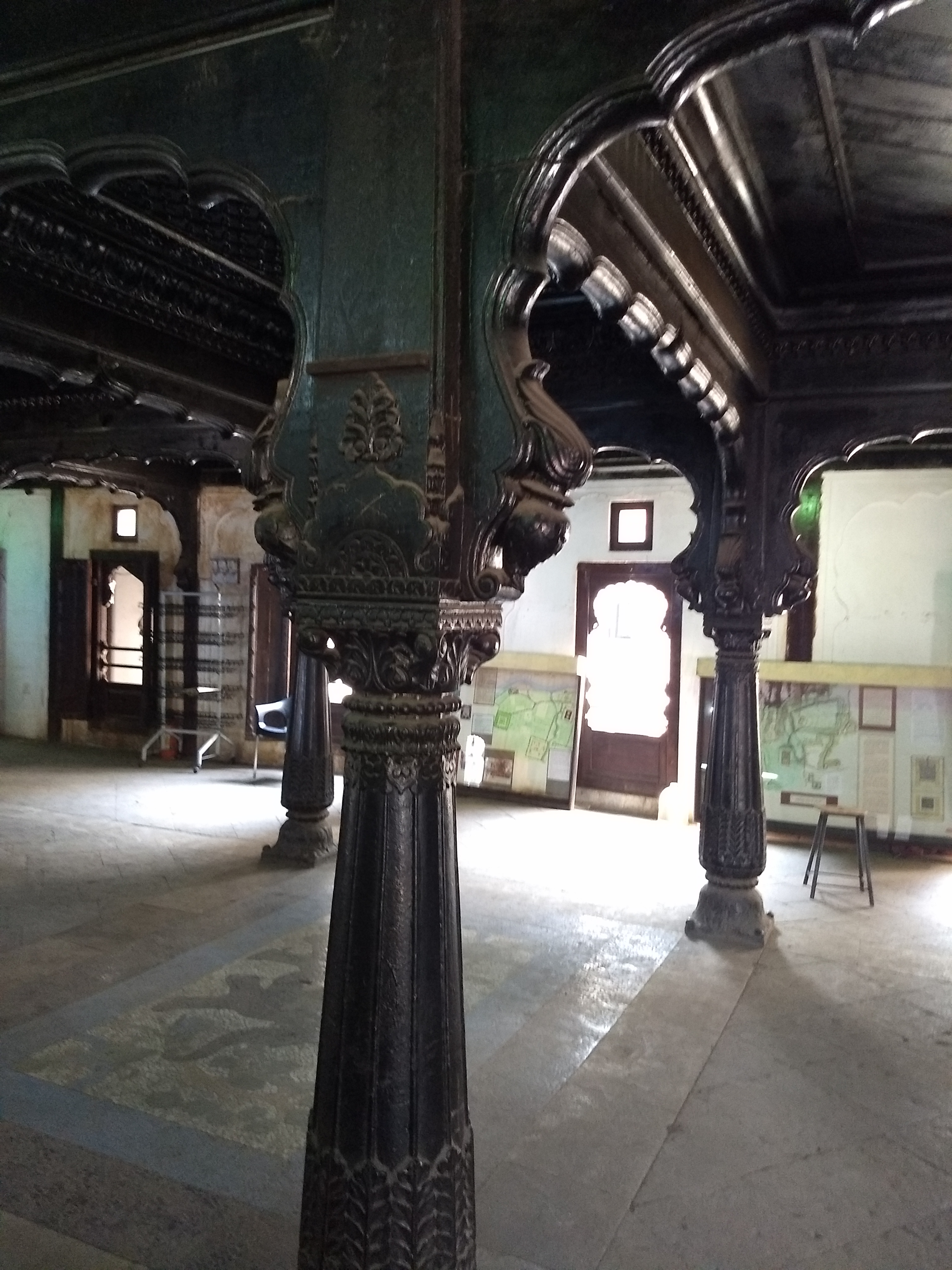
Inside View

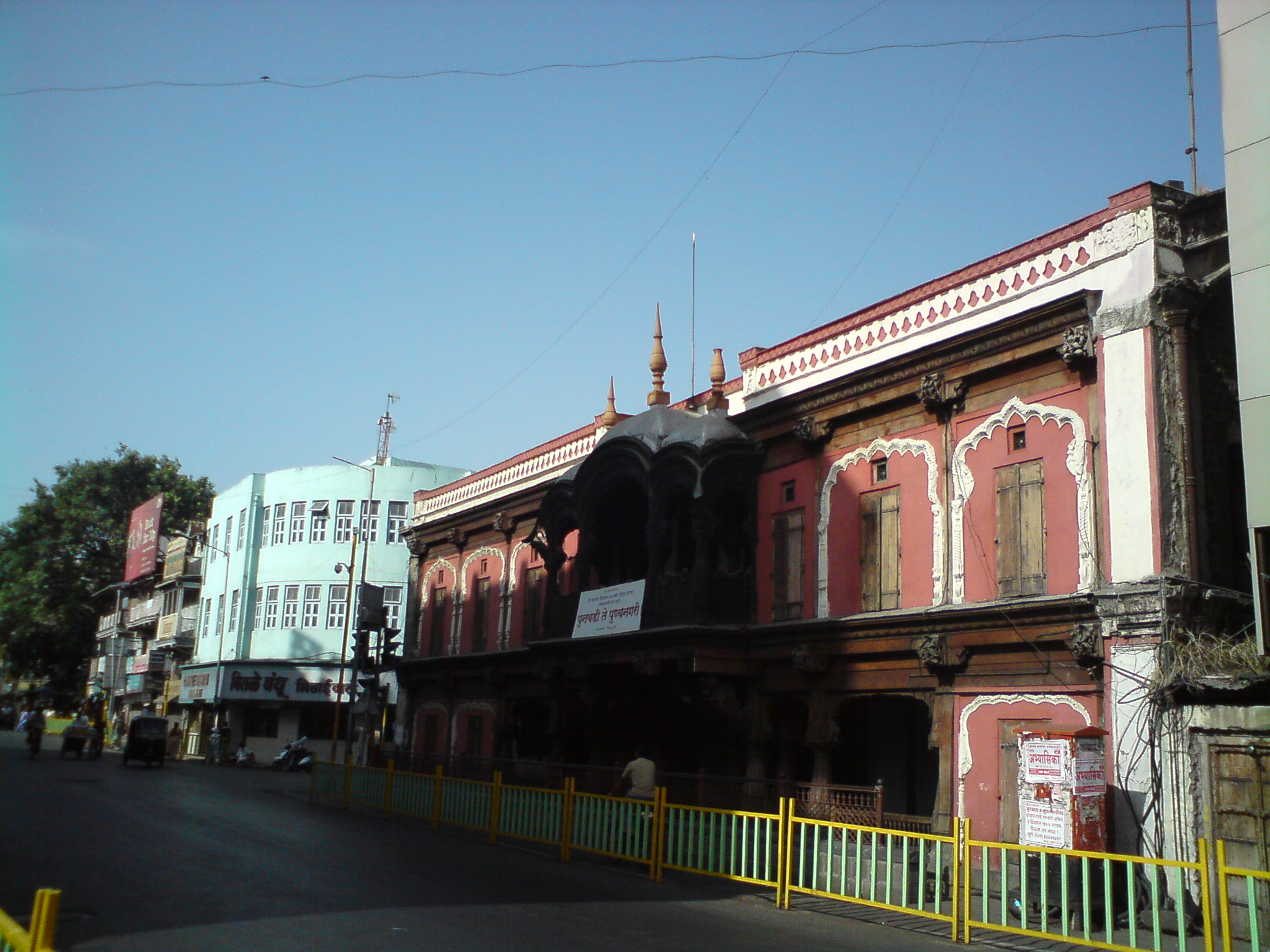
Street view

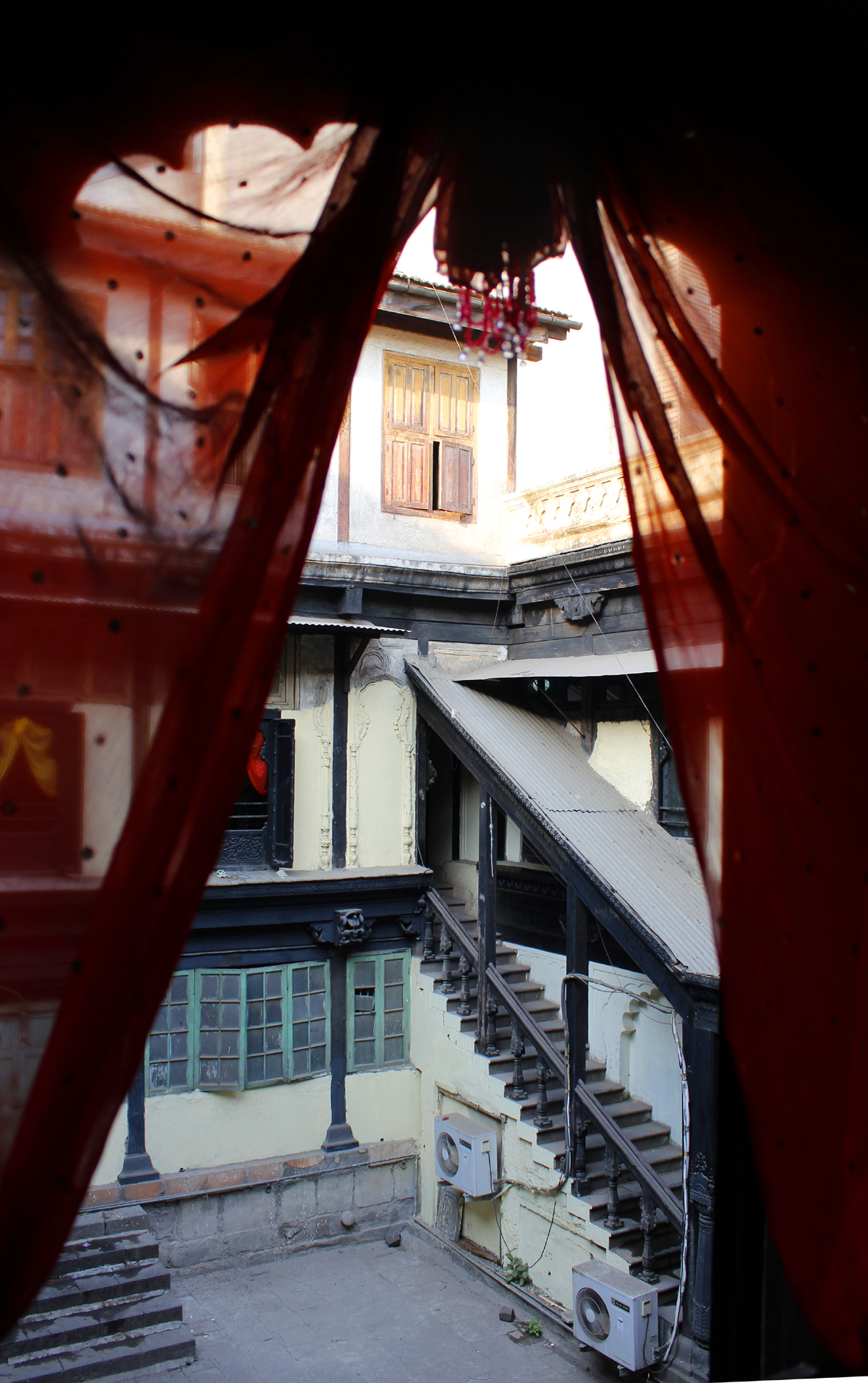
Courtyard

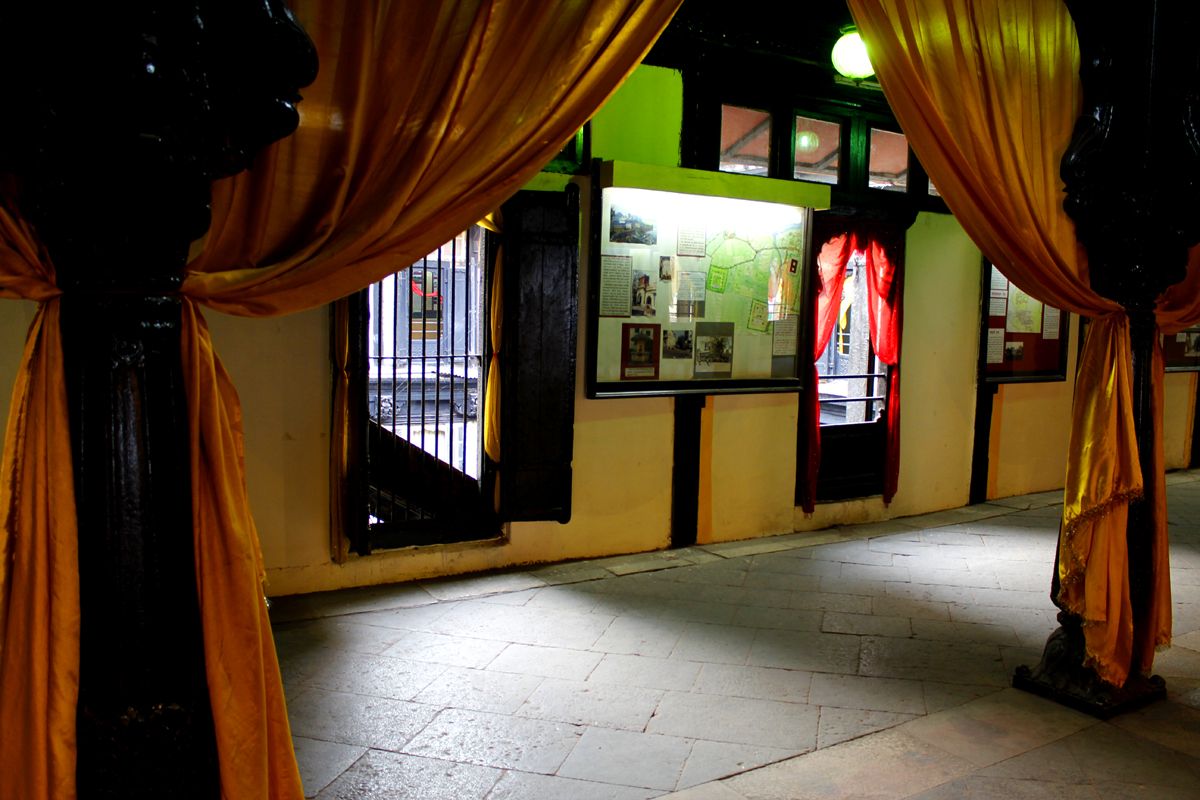
Windows
