= Deenanath Mangeshkar Hospital =

- shown in Pune, Maharashtra

Geography
- Location: Erandwane, Kothrud, Pune, Pune district, Maharashtra, India
- Coordinates: 18.50198°N 73.83217°E

Organisation
- Care system: Medicare
- Type: Medical Services

Services
- Beds: 900

History
- Founded: 1 November 2001 (24 years ago)

Links
- Website: www.dmhospital.org

Deenanath Mangeshkar Hospital (Marathi: दीनानाथ मंगेशकर रुग्णालय) is a large hospital in Pune, India spread over 6 acres (2.4 ha) with over 900 beds. It is named after the Marathi theatre actor, Natya Sangeet musician and exceptional Hindustani classical vocalist Deenanath Mangeshkar. The first human milk bank in Pune was established at this hospital.

== History ==
The Lata Mangeshkar foundation was established in Oct. 1989, by the Mangeshkar family of Indian musicians. The foundation was allotted a land of six acres by Govt. of Maharashtra for the proposed hospital. The foundation collaborated with the Jnana Prabodhini Medical Trust to erect the hospital. The hospital started functioning on 1 November 2001.

== Facilities ==
It has all the ultra modern facilities including blood bank, cancer research centre etc. The hospital has more than 65 ICU beds with a central monitoring system. The hospital has a well equipped air-conditioned auditorium (with a capacity of 3000 people), advanced sound system and a sophisticated video projection system too.

== Awareness programs ==
The hospital conducts lot of awareness programs and makes films for the people and society like the films on diabetes etc.
