= Pune Riverfront =

River in India

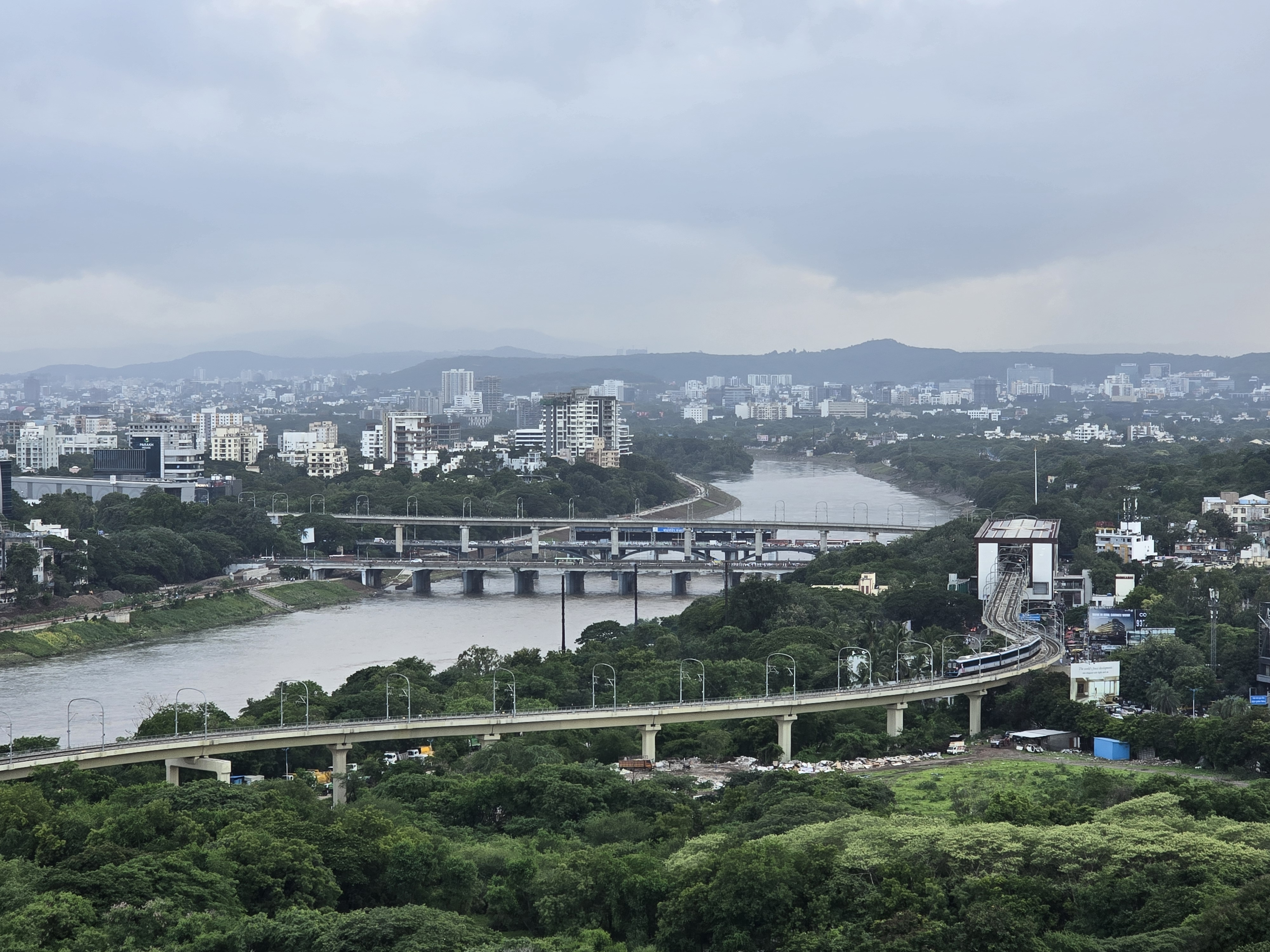
- Riverfront construction progress as of 2025
- Interactive map of Pune Riverfront
- Location: Pune, Maharashtra, India
- Coordinates: 18.531643°N 73.859776°E
- Status: Under construction
- Groundbreaking: 2023
- Estimated completion: 2026 (11 phases)
- Opening: 2025
- Use: Waterfront
- Website: puneriverfront

Companies
- Developer: Pune Municipal Corporation

Technical details
- Cost: ₹4,727 crore (US$500 million)
- Proposed: 2000

Pune Riverfront, also called the Mula-Mutha-Riverfront, is an under-construction urban waterfront project. The idea of municipal interventions in the Mula-Mutha rivers is over a hundred years old. Unlike the proposal of 1918, the present conception aims to engineer the city's rivers and expects to achieve multiple goals. It is being developed by Pune Municipal Corporation along the banks of Mula, Mutha and Mula-Mutha rivers. The municipal authority (PMC) initiated the project in 2015 by seeking bids for rejuvenation of Mula-Mutha rivers and beautification of 44.4 km (27.6 mi) of riverbanks.

A degree of ambiguity between riverfront development and iver rejuvenation projects has persisted, even within official nomenclature. This interchangeability is perceived as an intentional cosmetic make-up greenwashing encroachment upon rivers. For clarity, these are two projects: the rejuvenation project, estimated at ₹1,500 crore (US$160 million), for construction of sewage treatment plants (STPs) and management of municipal sewage under aid from Japan International Cooperation Agency (JICA); and the Mula-Mutha Riverfront, a ₹4,727 crore (US$500 million) project, for building concrete embankments. Despite the agreed wisdom on allowing room for the rivers, hectares of natural flood plains are expected to be freed up for a range of land use purposes to fund the project. Work on the initial phase began in 2022.

== History ==
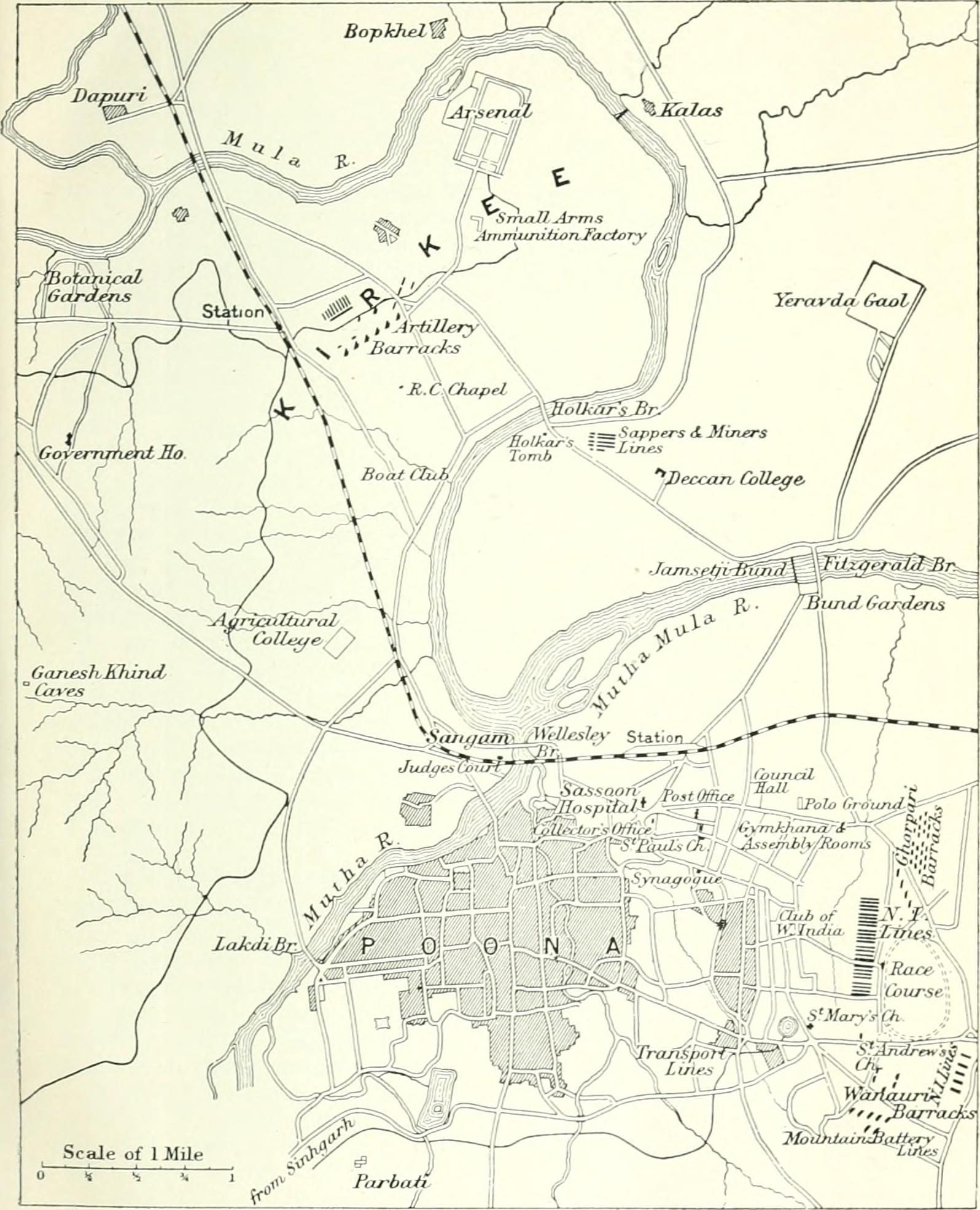
Poona of 1911

=== Ghats ===
It is pertinent to look at modern riverside structures from the lens of history. Traditionally, people's interaction with rivers has been through the various ghats, which are steps built usually in stone, leading down to the waterline. The steps afforded people easy access to the rivers and carry out their daily chores. Numerous such ghats still exist and have remained in use over time. Ghats are also the places where people congregate for immersion, or visarjan, of idols after ten days of Ganesh festival. Ghats are also often aesthetically designed built-structures and have remained cultural focal points over centuries. Ghorpade Ghat, Sangam Ghat, Omkareshwar Ghat, and the Moraya Gosavi Ghat in Pimpri are some of the prominent ghats. There are many live perennial springs along Pune's riverbanks, as well as much plant and animal biodiversity. Some ghats have designated spaces to serve as Hindu cremation grounds.

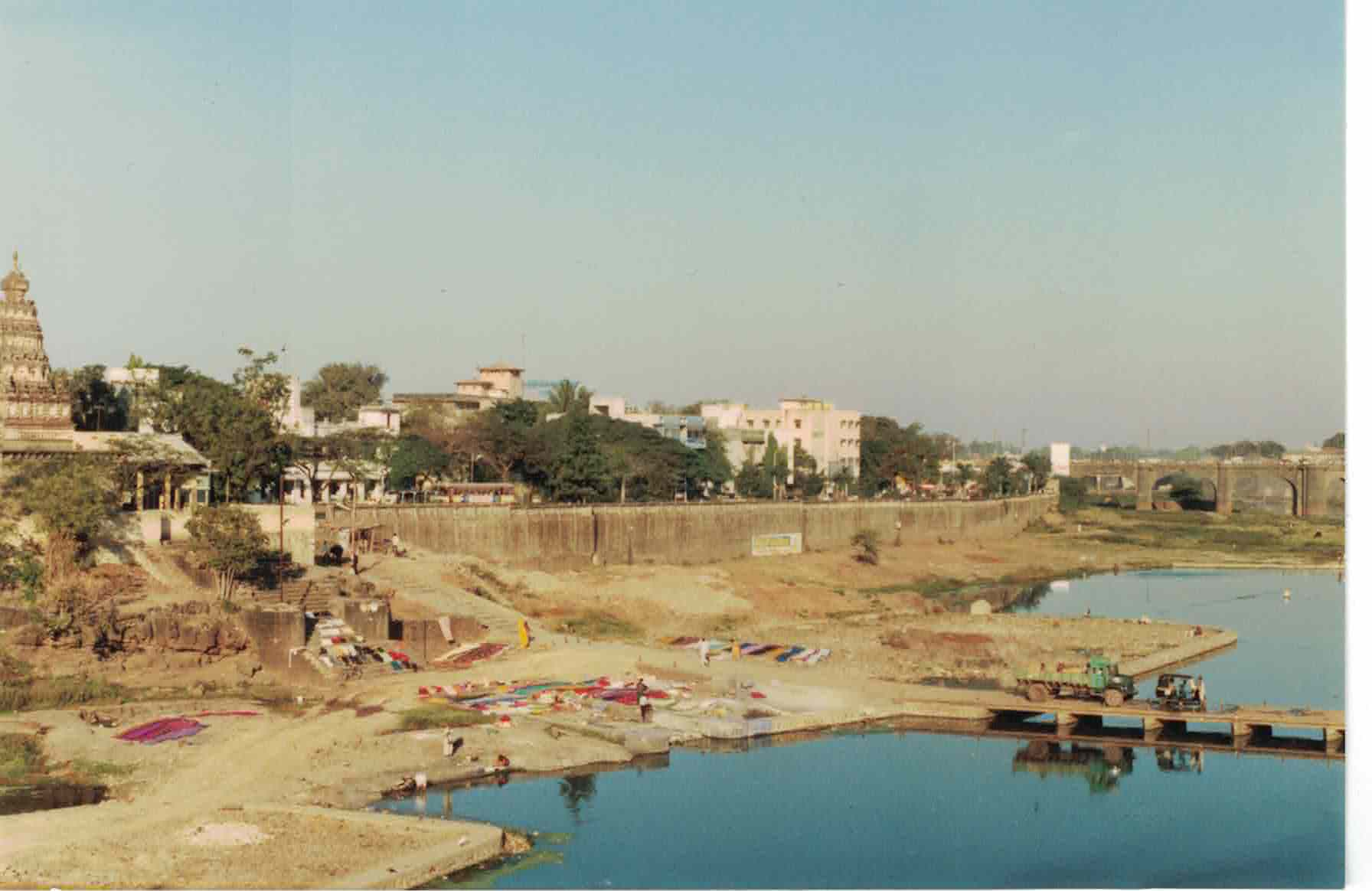
Mutha river at Onkareshwar, 1986

=== People's connect with rivers ===
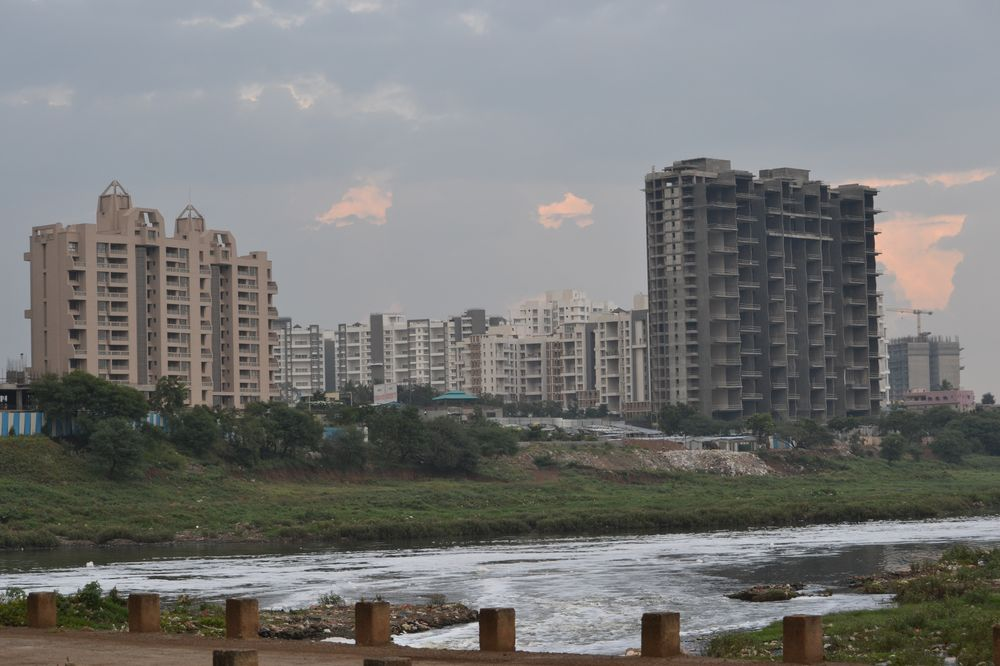
A social shift to apartment block housing disconnects people from rivers

Developments of the past decades, especially the advent of piped water and sewage lines as direct connections into households, gradually distanced people away from the rivers. More piped water also meant less water flowing in the rivers, as more water is hoarded behind dam walls. A social shift to block apartment housing has further caused increasing disconnect of people with the rivers.

=== Interventions on riverbanks ===
The present day riverfront project began to be discussed in the 2000s, sometime after the germ of Sabarmati Riverfront took root in 1997. But the idea of riverfront development was first considered by the city's municipality in 1918 under the British administration. According to the notes by Dr R. K. Naidu, the then chairman of Poona Municipal Council, and after whom the present day Naidu Hospital is named, the plan conceived a 50 ft (15 m) channel, walkways, and lawns along the riverbank from Lakadi Pul (Sambhaji Bridge) to the confluence at Mula-Mutha Sangam.

The proposed structure was intended to improve the flow in the river and create public space. It was supposed to be completed in two to three years at a cost of ₹100,000 (equivalent to ₹30,568,494 in 2023). The British regime of the day was not easily convinced and took 14 years to grant permission for a pilot project in 1932 and a full approval by 1933. The project entailed 50 feet (15 m) channelisation to contain the river throughout the year and create long pathways and recreational public spaces on the sides. The city was facing the challenge of malaria and infectious diseases during the time. The work of laying sewage and drainage lines was undertaken by the civic authority in the 1920s, and preceded the riverfront development work, which eventually was taken up in 1934. This effort too was later halted and left the project's promises undelivered through the twentieth century.

One hundred years apart, experts, scientists and the civil society, especially in Indian cities, have steadily sought prioritising ecological restoration and pollution abatement over cosmetic interventions.

== Geography ==
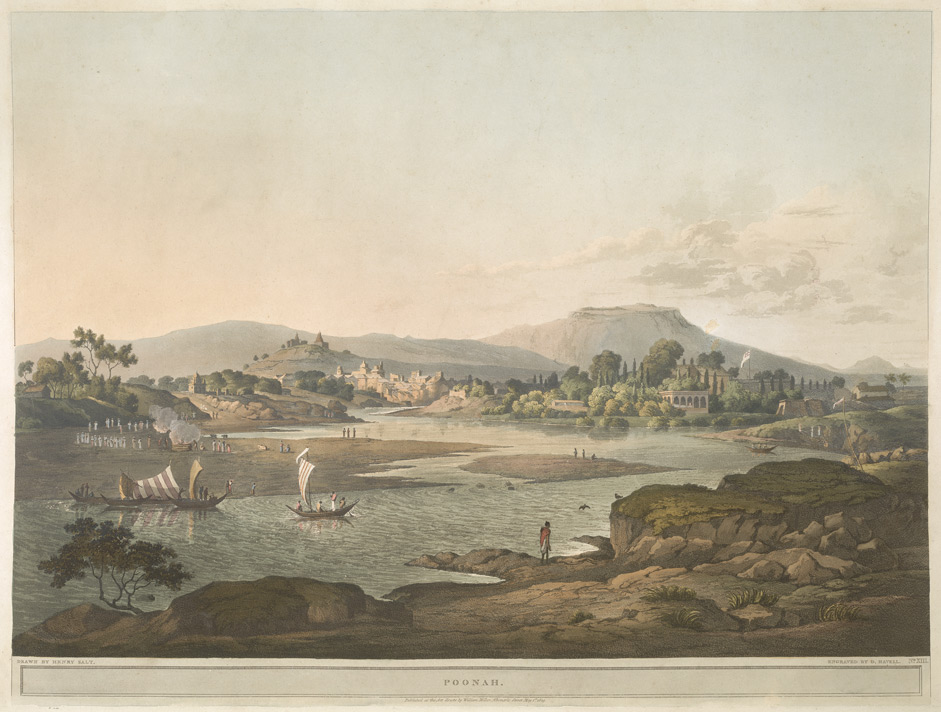
Saucer-shaped topography of Pune

=== Topography ===
Pune is situated on the eastern slopes of Sahyadri, which is characteristically the rain shadow region of the Western Ghats. Pune has a roughly saucer-shaped topography, with hills on all sides and large rivers crossing the city.

Five rivers viz., Mutha, Mula, Pawana, Ramnadi and Indrayani flow across urban Pune. Higher order streams like Nagjhari, Ambil Odha, Bhairoba Nala, and tributaries like Devnadi also add their flows to the main rivers. Pune district, with 39 dams, is deemed to have among the highest dam densities in India. Khadakwasla, Varasgaon, Panshet, Temghar and Mulshi are the major dams upstream of Pune's rivers. Of these, the Mulshi dam mostly drains on the western slopes of Sahyadri into the Kundalika river, but can also release waters into the Mula river. The other dams are a cascade of dams emptying finally into Khadakwasla, which is less than 20 km (12 mi) from the heart of Pune. The discharge from Kasarsai dam, located at 12 km (7.5 mi) from the Hinjawadi, passes across urban Pimpri-Chinchwad. As such, the city is blessed rich with surface waters.

=== Rainfall ===
The Govt of Maharashtra states the average annual rainfall of Pune as 650–700 mm (26–28 in). IISER-Pune researchers report an average June–October rainfall at about 850 mm (33 in) for the 42 years between 1978 and 2020. Some sources note the average annual total as 1,036 mm (40.8 in), while some others at 722 mm (28.4 in).

The hydrological realities of Pune can be better appreciated only when certain factors beyond mere rainfall are considered. This includes the type and number of rivers, upstream dams and the distance of dams from the city. Unlike Pune city, the large cumulative catchment lies mostly in a heavy rainfall zone of the Western Ghats. The catchment of Khadakwasla dam records over 1,000 mm (39 in) of rainfall, Varasgao and Panshet about 2,500 mm (98 in), and Temghar over 4,000 mm (160 in) of annual rainfall. The entire cumulative discharge must pass the urban stretches and, especially during compelling rainfall events, reaches the city very quickly when released. The Khadakwasla dam lies in a heavy precipitation zone and surrounded by mountains, is extensively silted. This implies compromised holding capacity of the reservoir, and consequently, increased probability of flash floods downstream.

=== Climate change ===
Beyond the historical rainfall data, the Maharashtra State Adaptation Action Plan on Climate Change (MSAAPC), prepared by The Energy and Resources Institute (TERI) in 2014, projects significant increases in monsoon rainfall across the state, with specific projections for the Pune division. The plan indicates that the Pune division is expected to experience a rise in rainfall, with projections showing an increase of 17.5% to 30% by the 2030s. Rainfall is estimated to further increase to 22.5% to 32.5% percent by the 2050s. Actual rainfall patterns of the years leading up to the 2025 season appear alarmingly consistent with the projection.

=== Urban landscape ===
Heavily paved cities, with scarce open grounds to allow infiltration of rainwater, cause very heavy surface runoffs up to 90% or more. The resulting pluvial flows further add to the already heavy fluvial flows from release of dam waters. This phenomenon is increasingly identified as the main cause behind a spate of recent urban flash floods all over the world. Encroachment in floodplains is another major factor that offsets the flood carrying capacity of rivers. In the case of Pune, apart from the many bridges that affect the flow of flood waters, the Mutha river bed is contentiously overlaid with 59 Pune Metro rail piers.

== Objectives of the project ==
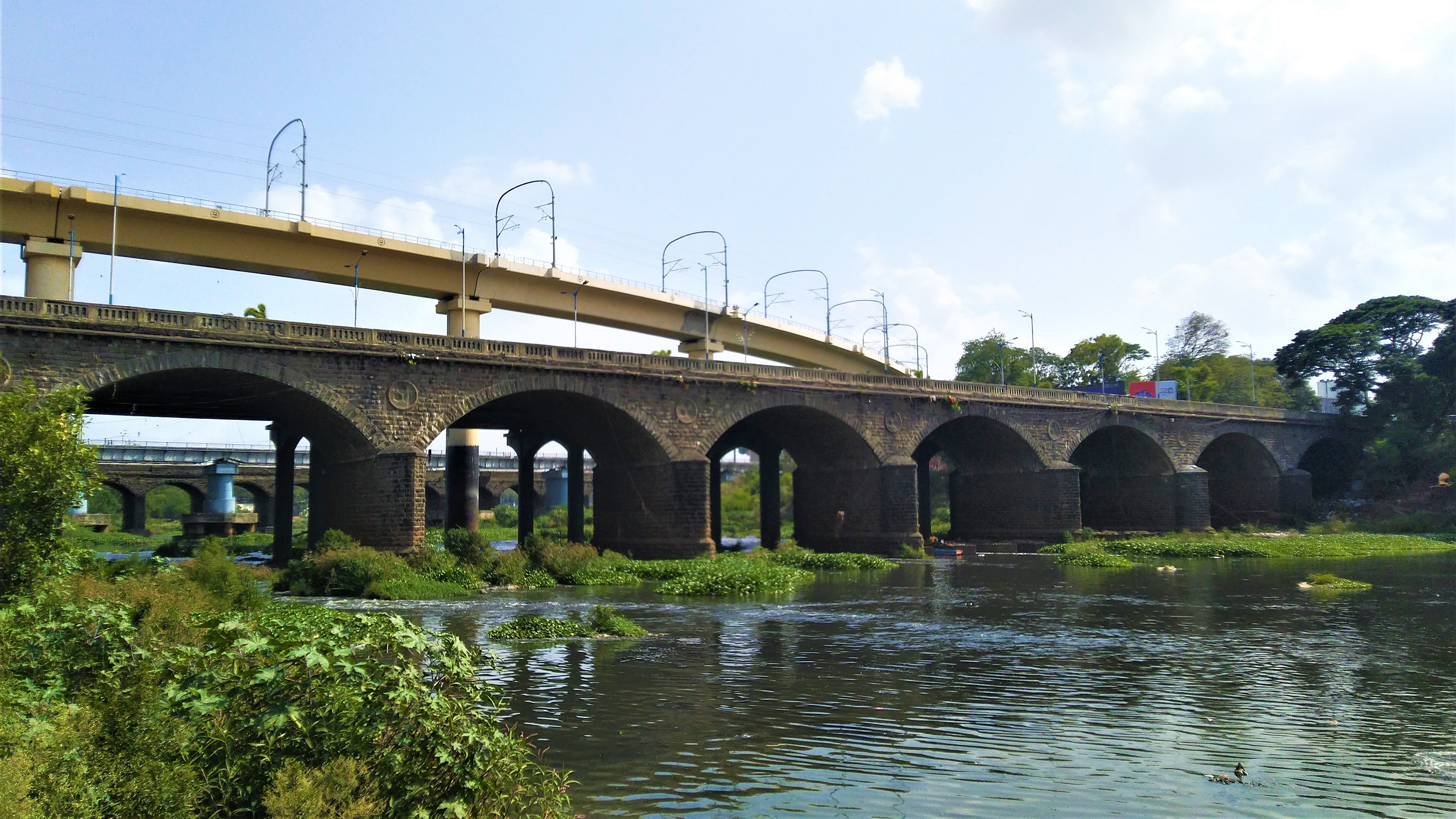
Sangam Bridge on Mutha River

The Mula-Mutha Riverfront project derives itself from the issues pertaining to the rivers in Pune city and their connect with the citizens. These observations are reported to be identified via formal surveys and interviews conducted for the purpose. Untreated sewage; solid waste & debris dumping; encroachment; flooding; lack of access and poorly conceived development about the rivers are cited. The objectives of the project are conceived "in order to cope up with these current issues and create a meaningful public realm along the river" and are stated thus in the Hydraulics and Hydrology Report on PMC website:

i. Reduce the risk of flooding

ii. Retain and replenish water

iii. Clean the river and make it pollution free

iv. Create a continuous public realm along the river

v. Connect and enhance surrounding heritage places and buildings

vi. Integrate slums

vii. Ensure more responsive and context specific development

viii. Improve accessibility and connectivity

The overall project is made up of numerous components viz., flood protection by building embankments; reducing impact of obstructions on water flow; abatement of pollution; making the river accessible to the public; making the river an asset of the city; creation of a green belt development; ensuring proper connectivity across the river; construction of barrages for water retention; provision of public amenities.

== Progress of the project ==
The project spanning 44.4 km (27.6 mi) is proposed to be executed in 11 phases covering different contiguous stretches of the rivers. The work is underway on multiple stretches. In February 2025, the Defence Estate Services transferred 17 acres of land under the Cantonment Board near Sangamwadi crematorium and Sadalbaba Dargah, facilitating the remaining work over the concerned stretch.

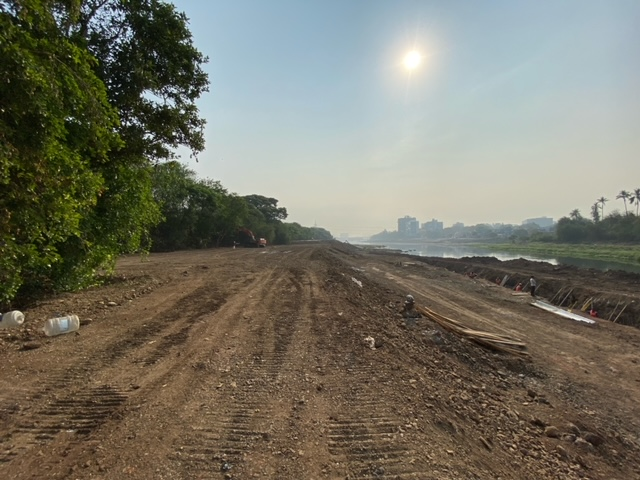
Levelling of the Mula Mutha river bank near Naikbet, Sangamwadi bridge, Pune

- Phase 1, the 3.7 km (2.3 mi) Sangamwadi to Bund Garden stretch: work is reported to be 80% to 85% complete as of March 2025. The 800 metres Bund Garden to Mundhwa stretch towards Koregaon Park, has been developed with walkways and landscaping. A 2 km (1.2 mi) stretch between Sangamwadi and Bund Garden (Stretch 9) was opened in June 2025 while awaiting official inauguration. The work is ongoing towards Koregaon Park on the opposite bank.
- Phase 2, the 5.3 km (3.3 mi) Bund Garden to Mundhwa: Work on this stretch is progressing at a slower pace, at less than 33% completion as of March 2025. The normally tedious land acquisition, and construction timelines, are being managed through a so-called War Room set up under the Maharashtra Chief Minister's office. On one hand, the concept of War Room has been praised for expediting land acquisitions for public infrastructure projects. On the other hand, it is also criticised as being too aggressive, especially in fast-pacing environment clearances like it were a war. It has even morphed its name by a subsequent government.
- Other Phases: Work on the Wakad to Sangvi Bridge stretch in Pimpri-Chinchwad has commenced, with tenders worth ₹297 crore issued. The final completion date for the entire project is listed as 2025, though specific dates for phases beyond the first are not available.
- The project has faced legal challenges posed by concerned citizens' groups. Through the five years since the foundation stone was laid in 2017, the municipal administration has waded through much public opposition. Actual ground-breaking of the project happened only in 2022. The implementation is supported and monitored by the Chief Minister's War Room.

== Citizen participation ==
The riverfront project has been conceived as a project for public good and holds citizens at its centre. Prior surveys conducted by the project consultants observed that citizens are disconnected from the rivers in their neighbourhoods. In reality, the average Punekar (Pune citizen) does yearn for a better access to, but is far more possessive of the rivers in their natural form.

When left out of the planning process, individuals and civic groups of Pune and Pimpri-Chinchwad organised numerous public events; online and offline meetings; protests; and demonstrations; demanding clarifications, contesting the economic, social and ecological propriety of the Riverfront Development (RFD) project, and calling for its repeal. More than 2500 people marched on the streets and carried out a chipko style (tree-hugging) protest in February 2025 against large-scale tree-felling.

A group of citizens undertook a hunger strike as part of a sustained protest campaign against the riverfront project, which culminated in a massive protest march named "Nadi Sathi Nadi Kathi," (for-the-river, along-the-riverbank) held on 27 April 2025.

Ecologists, biologists, river scientists, environmental conservation experts and citizen contributors offered constructive suggestions, some as formal publications:

- Ecological Society, a non-governmental ecological research trust, authored an elaborate 114 page alternative ecological restoration plan for Pune's rivers. The study and the report was commissioned by the Centre for Environmental Education (CEE).
- Pune River Revival, a public campaign for free-flowing clean rivers, offered a model titled Rejuvenating a Riverbank in an Urban Context.
- Jeevitnadi - Living River Foundation and Oikos - for ecological services, together prepared a model titled Beyond Beautification - River Revival Strategy, An Ecological Approach.

== Gallery ==
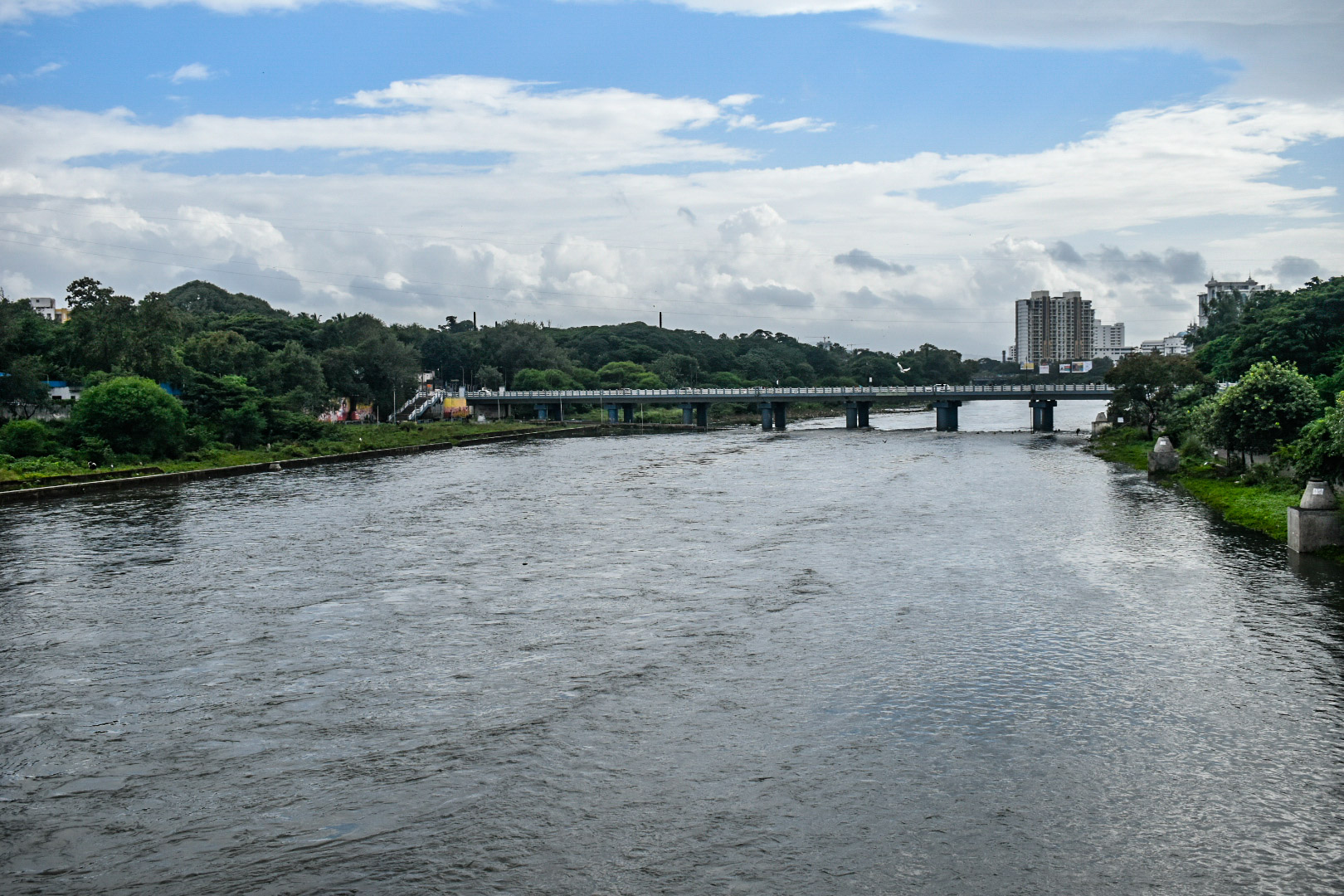
Mutha River

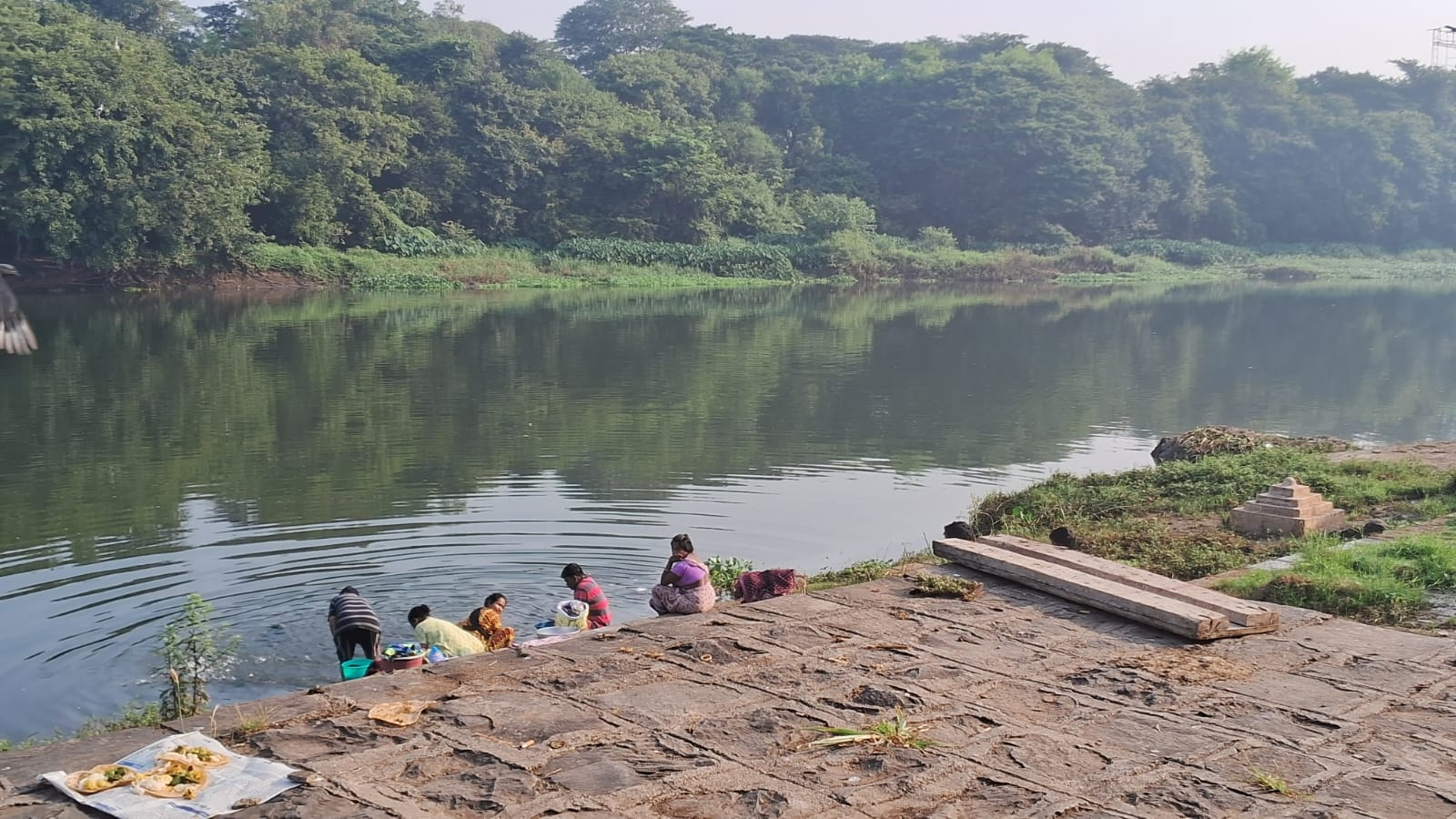
Aundh Ghat on Mula River

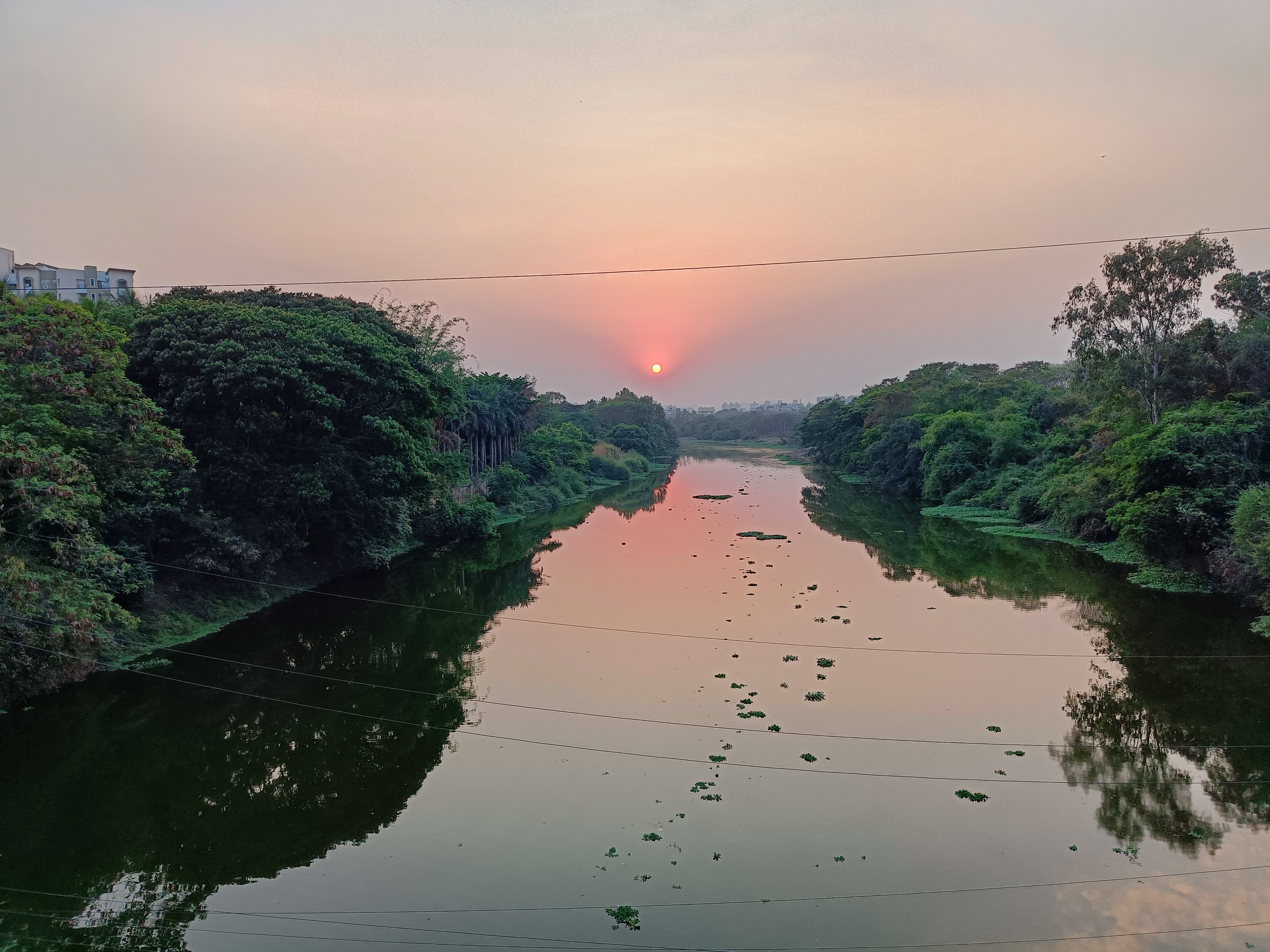
Mula River, view from Shinde Bridge

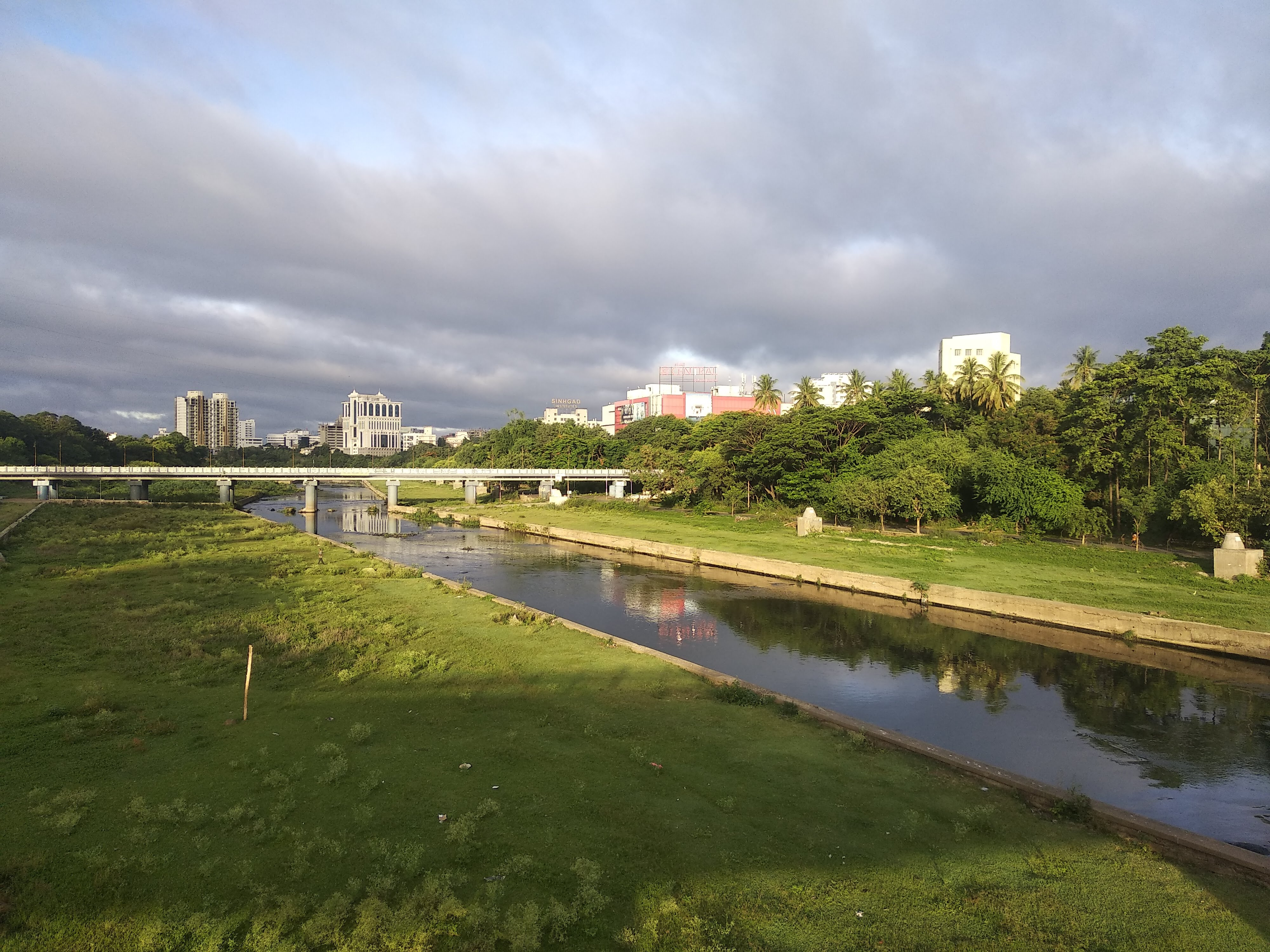
Mutha river bank

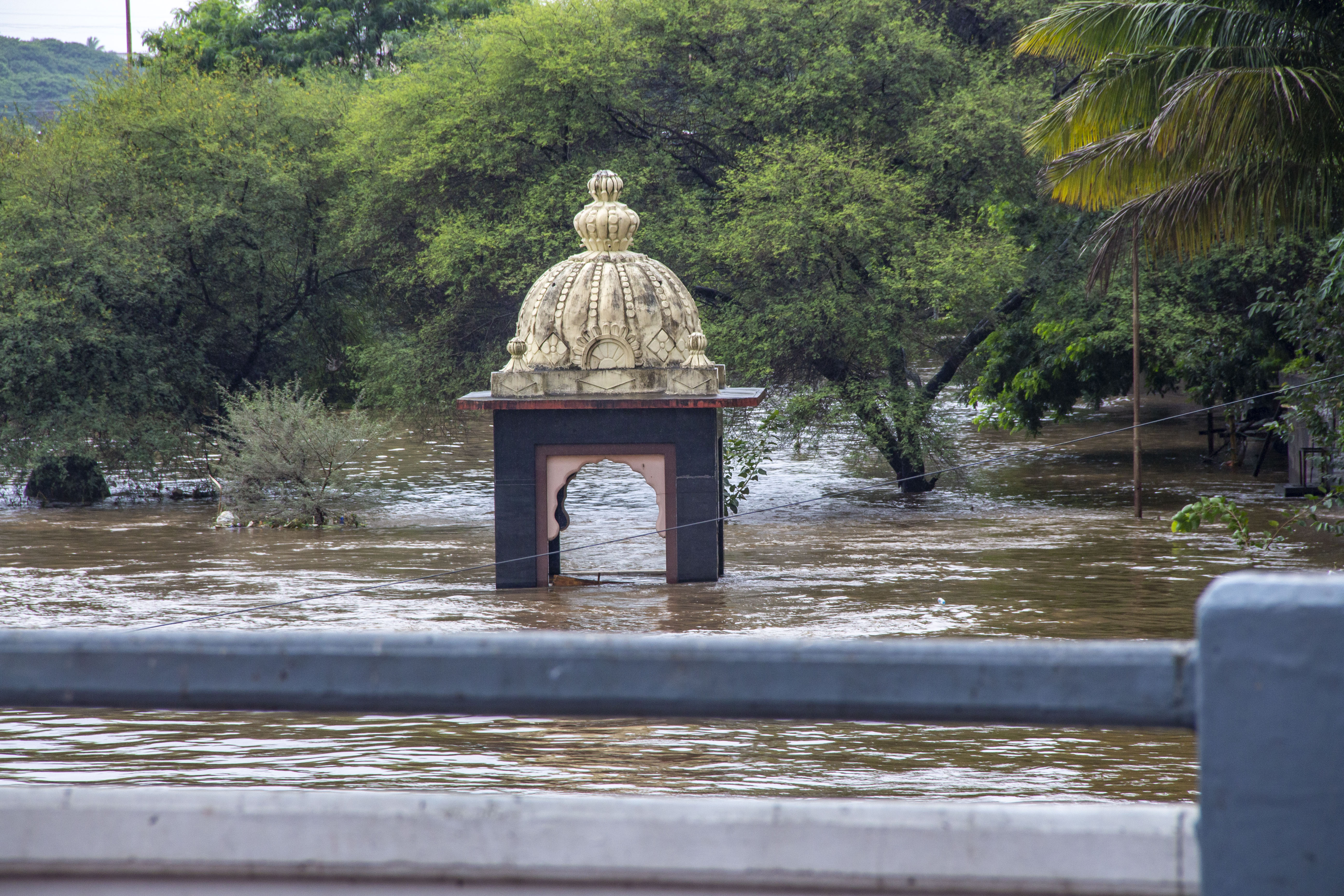
Nanasaheb Peshwe Samadhi under Mutha flood waters in August 2019

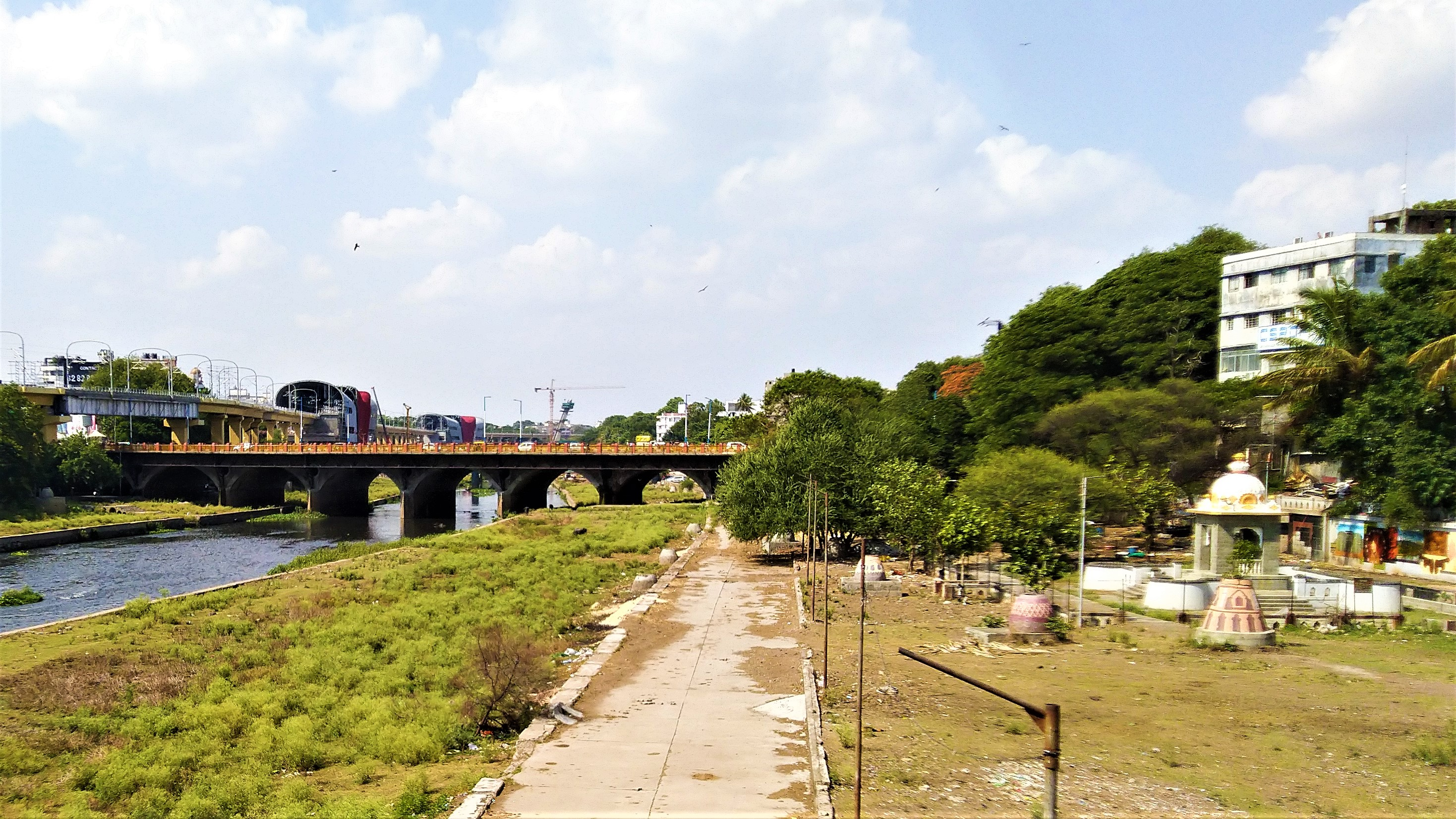
Floodplains of Mutha; Sambhaji Bridge and Deccan Gymkhana Metro Station in the background

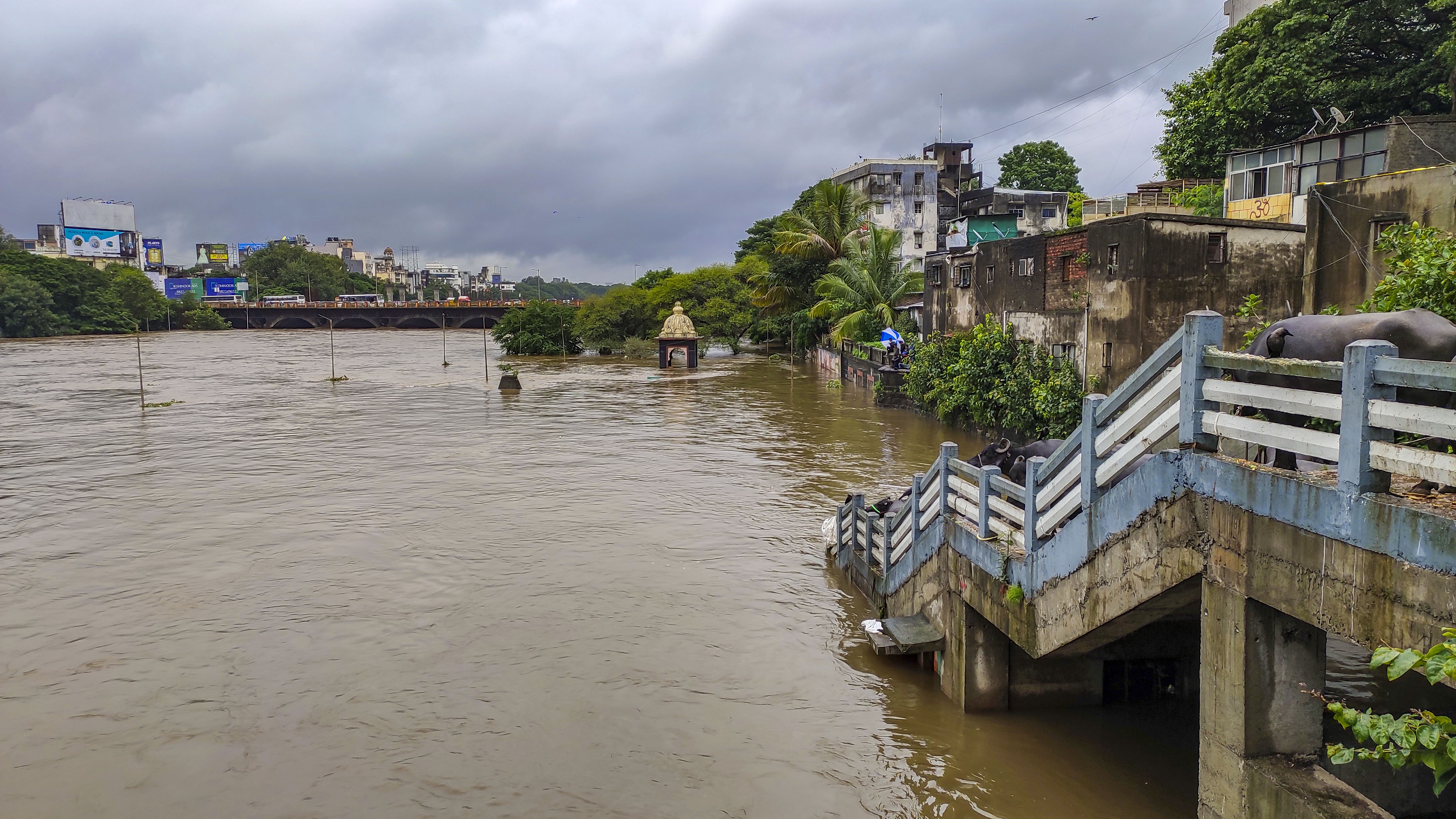
Mutha River floods of August 2019

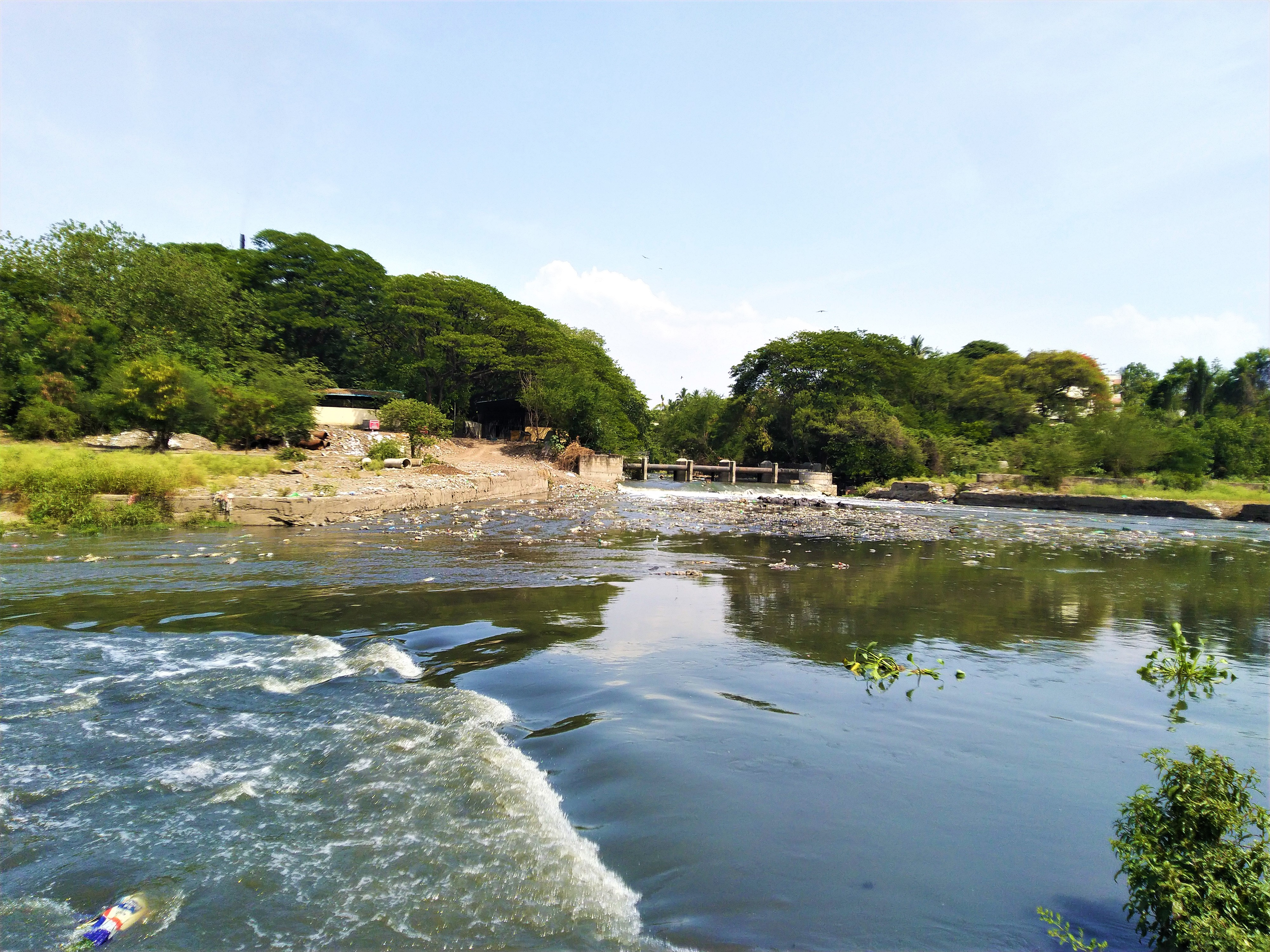
Ambil Odha meets river Mutha

== See also ==
- Riverfront
- Ghats
- Environment Impact Assessment
- River Ecology
- Environmentalism
