= Pune Camp =

Camp Pune Cantt
- Cantonment
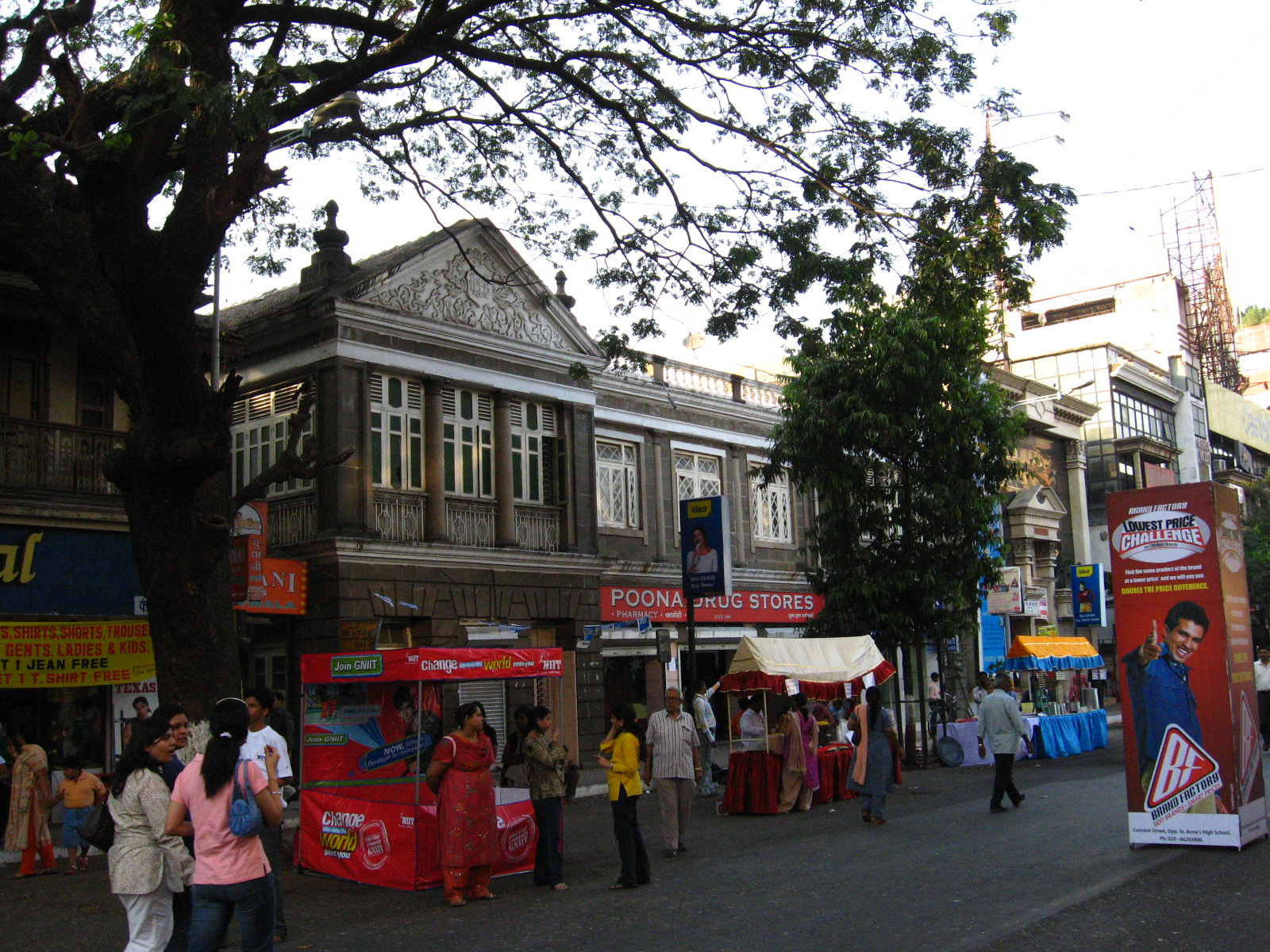
- MG Road in Pune Cantonment

- Logo

- Location in Maharashtra, India
- Coordinates: 18°30′45″N 73°59′09″E
- Country: India
- State: Maharashtra
- Region: Paschim Maharashtra
- Division: Pune
- District: Pune
- Established: 1817
- Taluka: Haveli taluka

Government
  - Body: Pune Cantonment Board
  - Cantonment Executive Officer: Shri. Amit Kumar

Area
  - Total: 11.9 km^{2} (4.6 sq mi)
- Elevation: 577 m (1,893 ft)

Population (2005)
  - Total: 79,454
  - Density: 6,680/km^{2} (17,300/sq mi)

Languages
  - Official: Marathi
- Time zone: UTC+5:30 (IST)
- PIN: 411 0xx
- Telephone code: (91)20
- Vehicle registration: MH 12, MH 14
- Lok Sabha constituency: Pune
- Vidhan Sabha constituency: Pune Cantonment
- Civic agency: Pune Cantonment Board
- Climate: Tropical Wet & Dry (Köppen)
- Avg. annual temperature: 24 °C (75 °F)
- Avg. summer temperature: 30 °C (86 °F)
- Avg. winter temperature: 12 °C (54 °F)
- Website: pune.cantt.gov.in

Pune Cantt, also known as Camp, is a military cantonment located in the city of Pune, India. It was established in 1817 for accommodating troops of the Indian Army. The cantonment houses many military establishments. It is also known for its shopping locations, MG Road and East Street. The headquarters of Indian Army's Southern Command is located in Pune Cantonment. The National War Memorial Southern Command which commemorates the sacrifice of soldiers of the Indian Armed Forces is also situated in the cantonment.

== History ==
The British Indian Army already had a small encampment west of the Mula River in Khadki. As more troops were required to be accommodated, a larger area was occupied to the west of the Mutha River, leading to the establishment of the Pune Cantonment in 1817 for accommodating troops of the British Indian Army. The villages of Mali, Munjeri, Wanowrie and Ghorpuri (Ghorpadi) were selected for this purpose. Initially, a garrison for 4,620 troops was planned for the cantonment. This included two European regiments, a mountain battery, a native cavalry and three native regiments. A central belt of 130 acres (0.53 km^{2}) was designated for training and drills. The firing ranges were located at Golibar Maidan. Soon a large number of civilians began settling in the area. This was encouraged since civilians provided services to troops garrisoned in the cantonment.

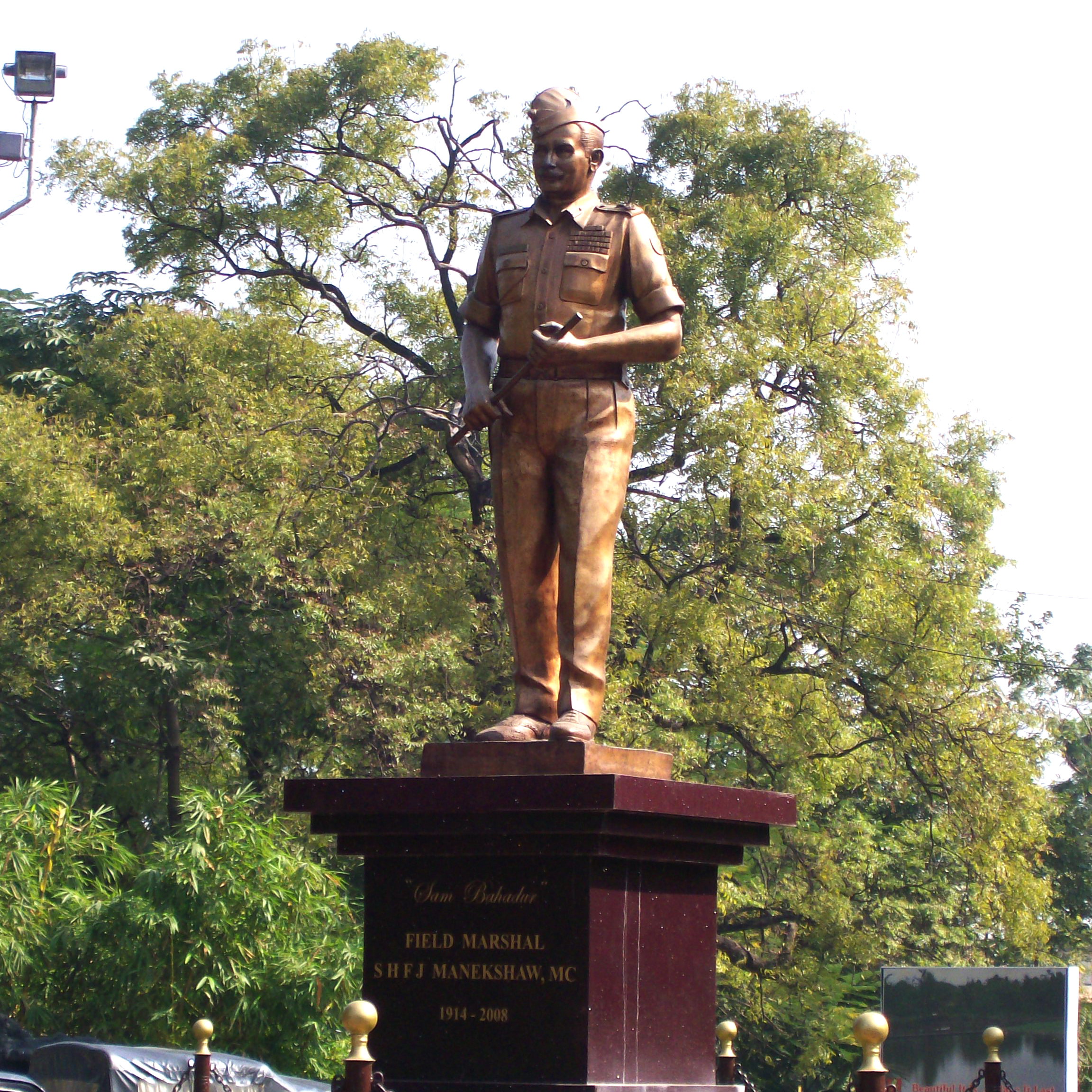
A statue of Sam Manekshaw in Pune Cantonment

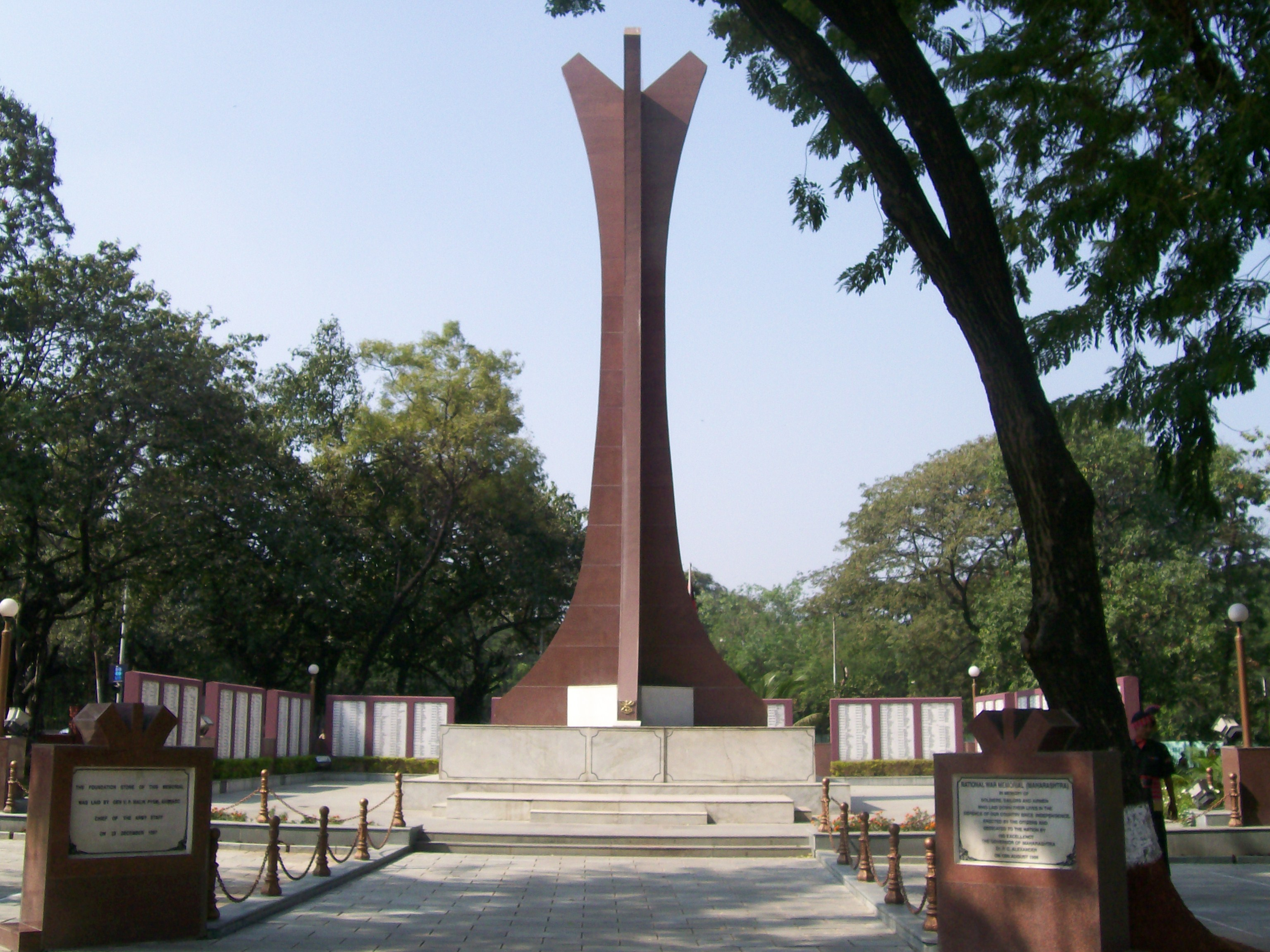
The National War Memorial Southern Command in Pune Cantonment

The limits of the cantonment were extended in 1822. In 1963, Ghorpuri village (Ghorpadi) and Fatima Nagar were merged into the cantonment area. The limit of the cantonment was again extended in the same year when Mundhwa village was included in the cantonment.

== Government and politics ==
Pune Cantonment is a part of the Pune Lok Sabha constituency. Pune Cantonment is a separate constituency of the Maharashtra Legislative Assembly (Vidhan Sabha). The currently elected Member of Legislative Assembly from Pune Cantonment constituency is Sunil Kamble.

== Civic administration ==
The Pune Cantonment Board is responsible for the civic administration of the cantonment. Pune Cantonment is not a part of Pune Municipal Corporation, instead, the Chairman, Cantonment Board is the head of the civic administration within the Cantonment Board area. The Lashkar Police Station is responsible for maintaining law and order in Pune Cantonment. The cantonment comes under Zone II of the Pune Police.

== Transport ==
Pune Cantonment is connected by public transport buses operated by the Pune Mahanagar Parivahan Mahamandal Limited. Autorickshaws are easily available in the cantonment. The NH-65 which connects Pune to Machilipatnam via Solapur and Hyderabad passes through the cantonment. The nearest rail link to the cantonment is the Pune Railway Station. The nearest airport is the Pune International Airport.

== Utility services ==
The Pune Municipal Corporation supplies water to the residents of Pune Cantonment. The Pune Cantonment Board has also set up public water posts for usage by economically backward sections. Electricity is distributed by the Maharashtra State Electricity Distribution Company Limited.

== Education ==
The Pune Cantonment Board runs one ITI college, three high schools and six primary schools in the cantonment area. In addition to these, there are many other private schools and colleges in Pune Cantonment. The Armed Forces Medical College, a prominent landmark, is also located here. Azam Campus is one of the biggest college campuses in the cantonment area for students, with more than eight colleges like dental, business, hotel management, pharmacy, senior college, junior college for girls and 5 schools.

== Health ==
The Pune Cantonment Board runs the Cantonment General Hospital, a 100 bedded hospital on the Solapur Road. It also runs 3 dispensaries in the Cantonment. A military hospital is also located in the cantonment. Additionally, Ruby Hall Clinic, Jehangir Hospital (both privately operated) and the Sassoon Hospital (state operated) are located in the vicinity of the cantonment.

== See also ==
- Khadki Cantonment
- Dehu Road Cantonment
