= National War Memorial =

National War Memorial may refer to:

- National War Memorial (Canada), Ottawa
- National War Memorial (India), New Delhi
- National War Memorial (New Zealand), Wellington
- National War Memorial (Newfoundland), St. John's
- National War Memorial Southern Command, Maharashtra, India
- National War Memorial (South Australia), Adelaide
- Irish National War Memorial Gardens, Dublin
- Scottish National War Memorial, Edinburgh
