= Peacock Bay =

Bay in Pune, Maharashtra, India

Peacock Bay is a part of Khadakwasla Dam's lake. This bay is owned by the National Defence Academy, Pune. The name is due to the large numbers of peacocks found in this area. Other animals found in this area are deer, lion-tailed macaques and civets. This lake covers an area of about 501 km^{2}, and the depth varies from 40 to 120 feet. This bay hosts various competitions like the annual national inland championship, open lake swimming competition, etc. This lake is a venue for water sports in Pune. This bay is just 12 km away from Pune and is situated on Mutha River.

== See also ==
- Mutha River
