= Mula-Mutha River =

River in India

Mula Mutha River
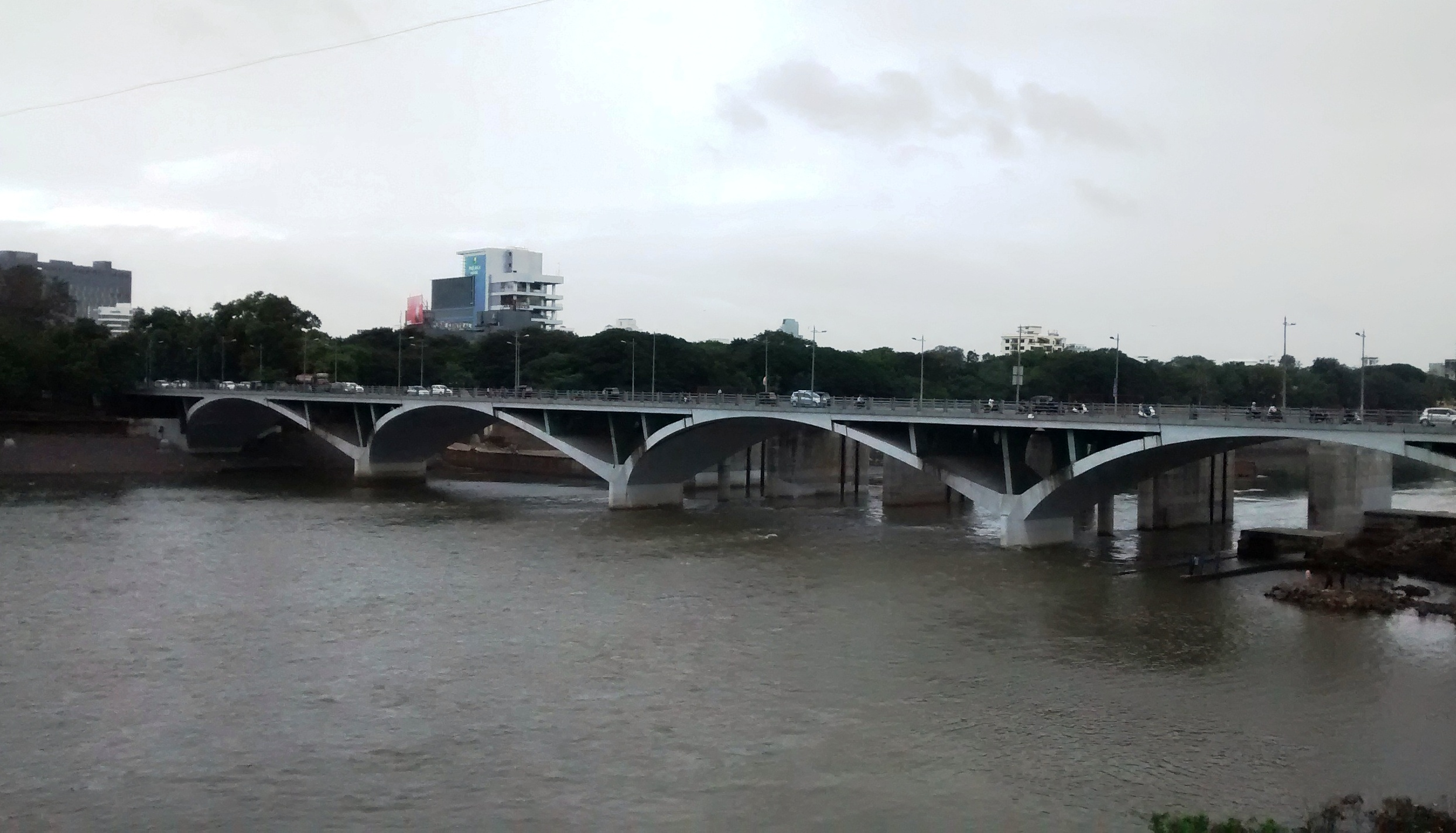
- New Yerawada Bridge over the Mula-Mutha River

Location
- Country: India
- State: Maharashtra
- Region: Deccan Plateau
- District: Pune
- City: Pune

Physical characteristics
- Source
  - location: Pune City, confluence of Mula & Mutha, Pune, Sangamwadi, Pune city
  - coordinates: 18°34′23″N 73°49′54″E
- Mouth: Bhima River
  - location: Pune District, Maharashtra, India
  - coordinates: 18°33′39″N 74°20′40″E
- Length: 71 km (44 mi)

Basin features
- Tributaries
  - left: Mula
  - right: Mutha

The Mula-Mutha is a river in India, formed by the confluence of the Mula and Mutha rivers in the city of Pune, Maharashtra state, which later flows into the Bhima River, which itself is a tributary of the Krishna River and finally empties into the Bay of Bengal.

The river flows through the village of Kavadi in the Pune district, witnesses many migratory birds. However, increase in pollution in the recent years has resulted in a reduction in the number of birds. Pollution from effluents released into the river at Pune has been found to cause high levels of pollution in the Bhima River, the reservoir of Ujani dam and Krishna River, too, resulting in many water-borne ailments.

Due to high levels of pollution, including 125 MLD of untreated sewerage water being discharged into the river by the Pune Municipal Corporation, the Maharashtra Pollution Control Board has classified the water quality to be of Class-IV. The Pune Municipal Corporation announced plans to clean up and restore the river by pumping in oxygen on the lines of restoration efforts undertaken in Mumbai for the Mithi River.

In 2011, it was reported that several Japanese businessmen were keen on offering support to a plan initiated by the Mahratta Chamber of Commerce, Industries and Agriculture and supported by the Pune Municipal Corporation to clean up and beautify the Mula-Mutha river. The same year, the Pune Municipal Corporation gave its approval to build a riverside road on the banks of the Mula-Mutha from Shivane to Kharadi, covering a distance of 22 kilometres (14 mi) to link several important roads in the city.

In 2014, the Pune Police discovered that marijuana plants were being grown on the riverbed near Kharadi.

In 2022, the Pune Municipal Corporation under the ruling party BJP has given its nod to spend over Rs5,500 crore on the improvement and beautification of the Mula-Mutha river in the coming years, in this two mega projects including development of the riverfront (total Rs4,000 crore) and rejuvenation of the river (total Rs1,500 crore) will take place. According to RTI requests filed by Sarang Yadwadkar, an environmentalist, the project is laced with many irregularities and has been violating environmental norms.

== See also ==
- Pune Riverfront
- Krishna River
- Bhima River
