= National War Memorial Southern Command =

Monument in Pune, India

Coordinates: 18°31′19″N 73°53′28″E

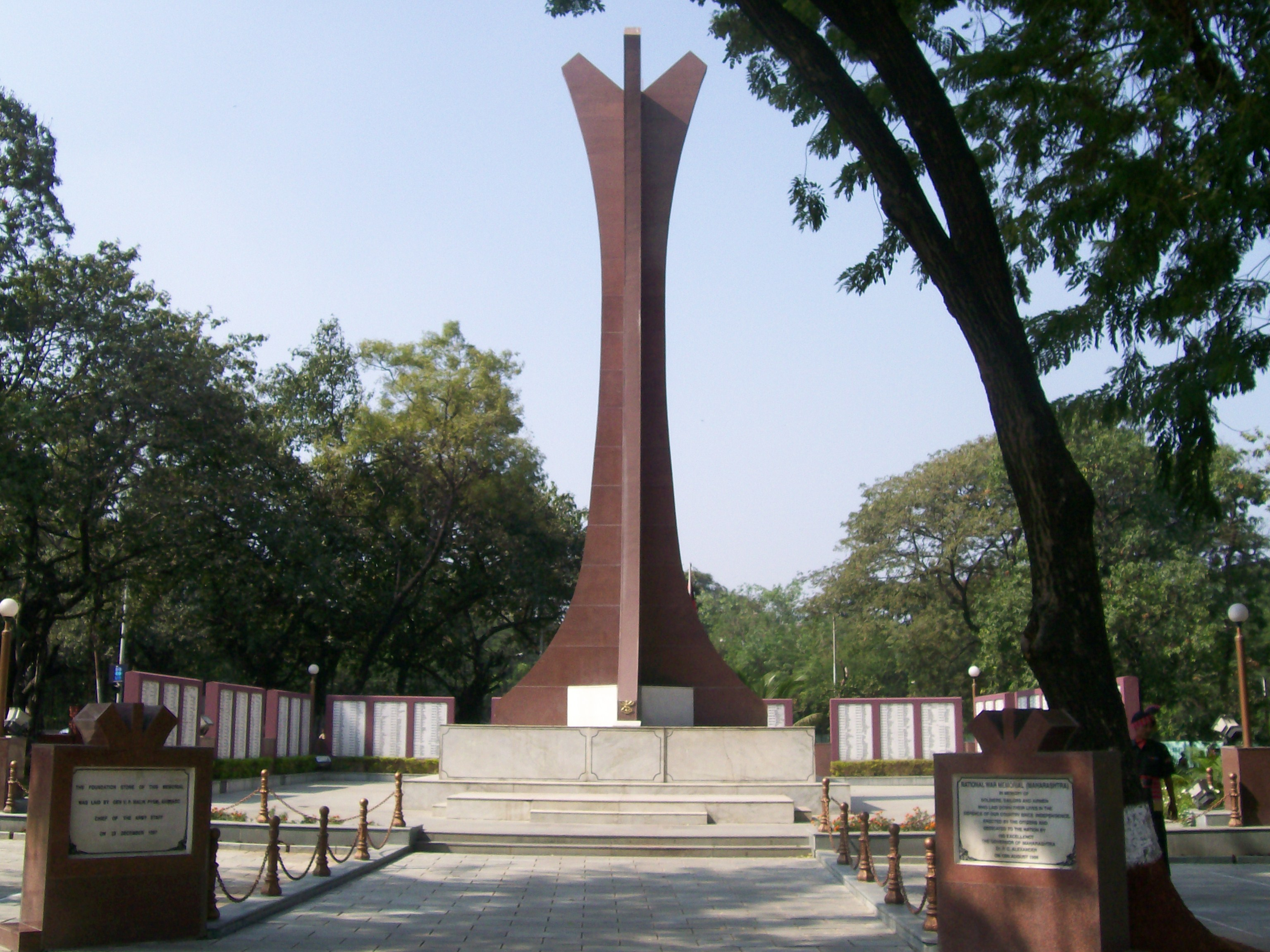
The National War Memorial Southern Command in Pune Cantonment

The National War Memorial Southern Command is a war memorial in the city of Pune, India, dedicated to post-Independence war martyrs. This is the only war memorial in South Asia which has been erected by citizens' contributions.

The memorial was unveiled and dedicated to the nation on 15 August 1998. A MiG-23BN, used in the Kargil War, is on display at the memorial.

A replica of the now decommissioned frigate INS Trishul, which served in the Liberation of Goa and the Indo-Pakistani War of 1971, is also on display.

There is a museum which showcases equipment used by the Southern Command over the years like their uniforms, ammunition, vehicles, tanks, and guns. The museum also gives the history of the Southern Command, the battles fought by them, the accolades won and other information.

There is also a sound and light show held every Friday, Saturday and Sunday.

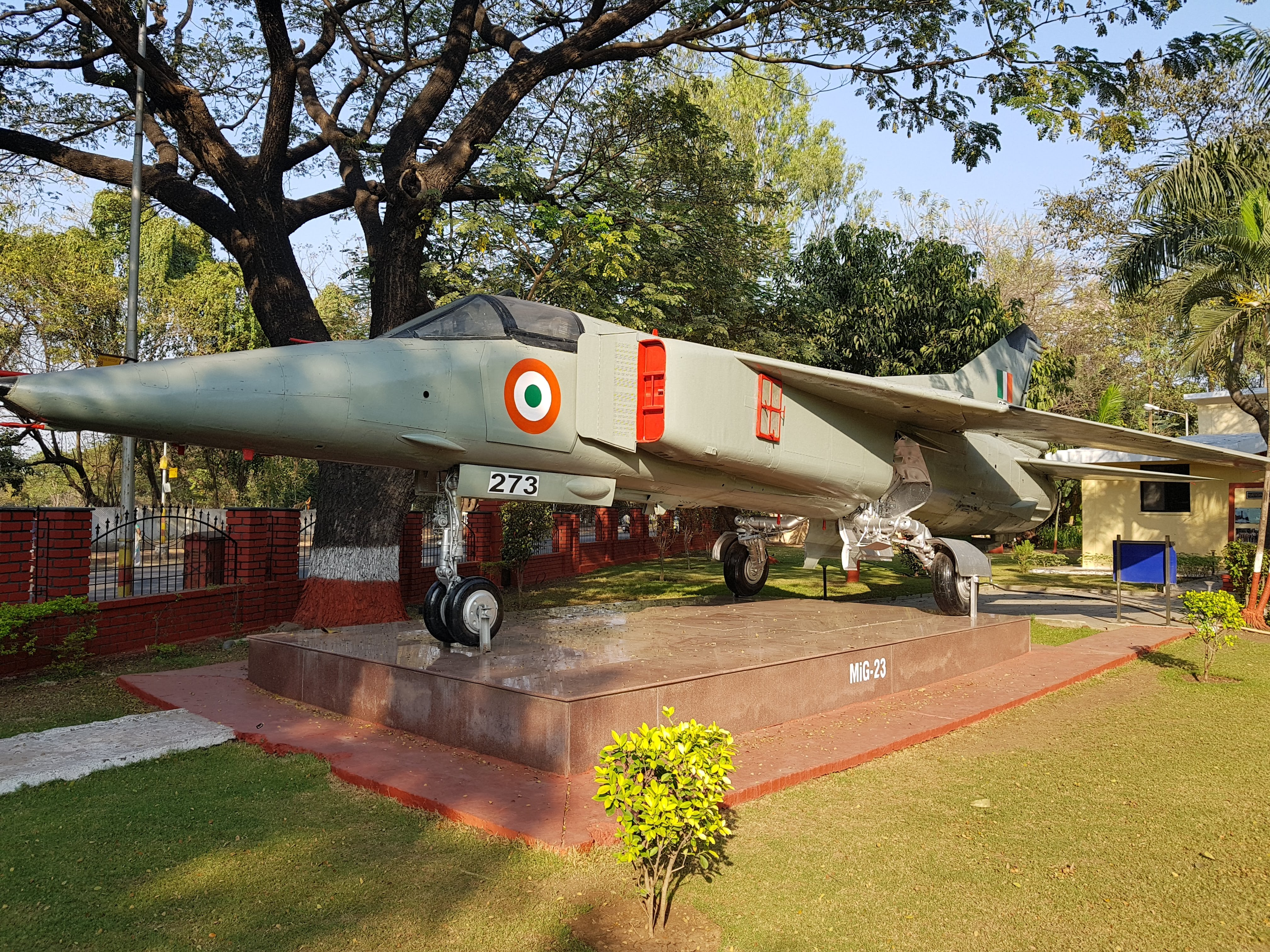
MiG-23BN aircraft at National War Memorial Pune

In 2008, the Pune Cantonment Board sanctioned a sum of ₹32,00,000 ($47,550) for renovation of the memorial. The work included laying a new lawn, landscaping and laying pathways for visitors.

== See also ==
- National War Memorial in New Delhi
- India Gate in New Delhi
- National Military Memorial in Bengaluru
- National Police Memorial in New Delhi
- Kargil Vijay Diwas
- Vijay Diwas (India)
- Bijoy Dibos
