= Khadakwasla Dam =

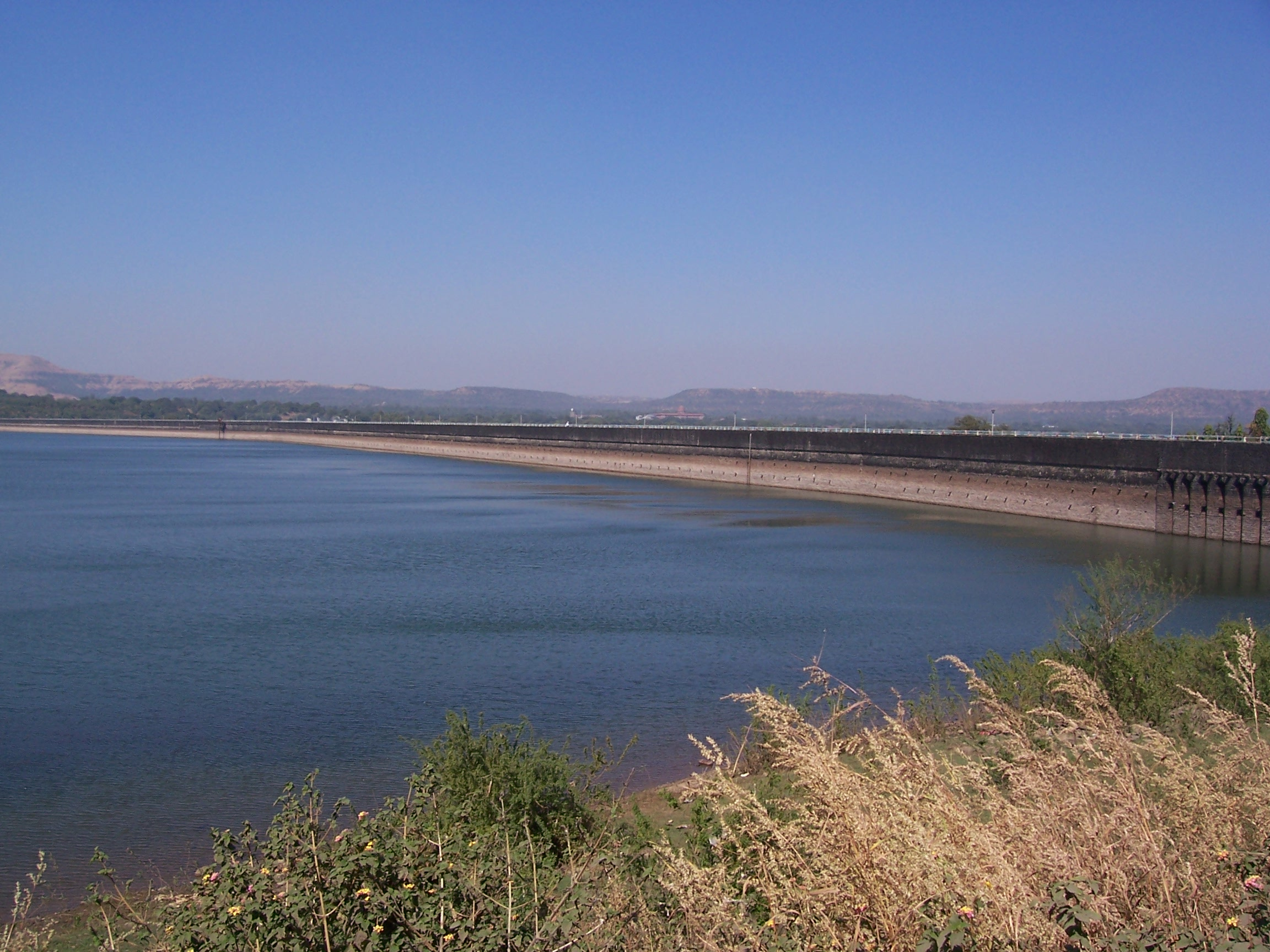

- Location within Maharashtra
- Official name: Khadakwasla Dam
- Location: Khadakwasla Village, Pune, Maharashtra; India
- Coordinates: 18°27′11″N 73°32′28″E
- Opening date: 1969
- Owner: Government of Maharashtra

Dam and spillways
- Impounds: Mutha River
- Height: 31.71 m (104.0 ft)
- Length: 1,939 m (6,362 ft)

Reservoir
- Creates: Khadakwasla Lake
- Total capacity: 341 million cubic metres (12.0×10^{9} cu ft)

Khadakwasla Dam is a dam on the Mutha River 21 km (13 mi) from the centre of the city of Pune in Maharashtra, India. The dam created a reservoir known as Khadakwasla Lake which is the main source of water for Pune and its suburbs.

In the vicinity of Khadakwasla Dam is the National Defence Academy (NDA), the Defence Institute of Advanced Technology (DIAT), the College of Military Engineering, Pune (CME, Dapodi) and Central Water and Power Research Station (CWPRS). A few kilometres to the south lies Sinhagad Fort; the twin dams of Panshet and Varasgaon, which mainly supply water for irrigation but also feed into Khadakwasla Lake, lie just 8 km (5.0 mi) due west of the backwaters of Khadakwasla Lake.

Khadakwasla Dam burst at 7:30 am on 12 July 1961, causing the greatest ever disaster to strike Pune. It was not blown up, as some have been led to believe, it simply collapsed at the point of greatest impulsive force, unable to withstand the destructive forces generated by three times the quantity of water gushing in from upstream than it was meant to store at peak capacity as placid water.

== Design ==
The Khadakwasla Dam is 1.9 km (1.2 mi) long. The dam has been built on the Mutha River, which begins from the confluence of the rivers Ambi and Mose on which the Panshet and Varasgaon Dams are built respectively, and the outflow from Temghar Lake through Temghar Dam about 15 km (9.3 mi) north of Varasgaon Dam into Khadakwasla Lake. The length of the Khadakwasla backwaters is nearly 22 km (14 mi) and the width varies from 250 to 1,000 m (820 to 3,280 ft). The maximum depth in the lake is 36 m (118 ft). The dam has 11 radial type sluice gates and six irrigation outlets, flowing into two canals as explained below. Of the three feeder lakes, Varasgaon is the largest, followed by Panshet and Temgarh, in that order. The source of Panshet is close to the base of both Rajgad and Torna Forts and Panshet is the highest of the three, some 30 m (98 ft) higher than Khadakwasla. Varasgaon Lake is at the same level as Khadakwasla, and only water released deliberately moves into the Mutha, and then, on to Khadakwasla. Fort Rajgad does not reach the imposing height of Sinhagad Fort, stopping at 2851 feet above sea level.

The Panshet reservoir has a capacity of 2.70 million cubic meters, with Varasgaon reservoir, a larger body, having even more. The Khadakwasla Dam was founded on hard rock. It had a height of 31.25 m (102.53 ft) above the river bed, with a 8.37 m (27.46 ft) depth of foundation. Its crest length was 1.47 m (4.82 ft) and has a free board of 2.74 m (8.99 ft). The dam had a flood capacity of 2,585 m^{3}/s and a reservoir of 2.78 million cubic meters. It cannot accept water from both Panshet and Varasgaon together, unless its sluice gates are fully open, causing an overflow of water into Pune, which would perforce allow the waters to end up in the Bhima River and add to water in reverse flow into the Mula River coming East all the way from Mulshi Lake and Dam south of Lonavala, a hill station some 50 km (31 mi) west of modern Pune. The plan envisaged control of these three dams to benefit the rapidly expanding city of Pune. The original dam, built in 1879 as a masonry gravity dam founded on hard rock was the first of its kind in the world. This dam was designed by Sir M. Visvesvaraya.

Many people come here on weekends and during the monsoon season. Scenic places around the dam include Peacock Bay, Kudje village and Neelakantheshwar (नीलकंठेश्वर), located near Bahuli village just past Kudje. The Sinhagad road, bordering the dam, has become a favourite picnic spot. There is a "Chowpatty" offering snacks, fast food and non-alcoholic drinks. Peacock Bay, however, is out of bounds to the public at large, being part of the NDA, a Defence Forces establishment.

== Water Quality ==
The backwaters of Khadakwasla Lake, right up to Panshet, Temgarh and Varasgaon dams and lakes, as well as the water in the Ambi/Mutha/Mose river/rivulet do not pass through tenanted areas, limiting induction of pollutants to natural levels. There is no discharge of effluents into these water bodies yet. Filtration of such water is therefore easy and the establishments around Khadakwasla Lake get potable water without much effort. In fact, Lavasa minicity, which was being built on the northern fringe of Varasgaon lake had its construction halted by the Bombay High Court on 7 December 2010, due to its proximity to the lake as it was feared that it could lead to progressive contamination of the water supply to Pune. The dams on the lakes are now turning into tourist spots and the outgoing water might suffer a drop in quality, unless controlled.

In a modernisation programme, the two existing canals from Khadakwasla Lake will be upgraded to prevent losses due to evaporation, seepage and theft. The first 32 km (20 mi) outbound of the right bank canal will carry water via a tunnel and the land above used for public amenities. The left bank canal that supplies drinking water will now be replaced by a pipeline. The programme envisions all canals in Pune replaced by pipelines. Put together, there will be a huge saving of relatively less polluted water, which will then be used to meet the vastly increased demand in volume of water consequent to the expansion of Pune City. It is a great source of water supply for pune.

== History ==
The birth of Khadakwasla lake took place due to the severe droughts during the 19th century in East Pune that paralysed crop growth and prompted engineers to take up major irrigation works. Captain Fife RE of the British Army recommended a high level reservoir at Khadakwasla in 1863 and subsequently carried out detailed surveys and investigations. This man-made lake was therefore named after him, Lake Fife. It was renamed Khadakwasla Lake shortly after independence. The work on one of the oldest masonry dams of India began in 1869 and was completed in 1879 at the cost of Rs. 65 lakhs (INR 6.5 million, then the equivalent of US$2 million and GB£600,000). Panshet Dam was nearing completion in July designed to regulate the supply of water to Khadakwasla Lake, in such a manner that the huge reservoir would have more than adequate water for the people of Poona (Pune). The reservoir is the source of water for the two canals referred to above that start at Khadakwasla. The right bank canal is 112 km (70 mi) long and irrigates about 45,000 hectares (170 sq mi) of land in Pune district and the villages around Haveli, Daund, Indapur and Baramati, while the left bank canal supplies drinking water to Pune, Kirkee and surrounds.

Panshet Dam was zoned at a height of 51 m (167 ft) with impervious central core outlet gates located in a trench of the left abutment; hoists were not fully installed when floods occurred at the site of construction. The reservoir had a capacity of 2.70 million cubic meters. Between 18 June – 12 July 1961, the recorded rainfall was 180.3 cm (71 in), stressing Panshet dam to its limits. The average rainfall for that period is 125–130 cm (49.2–51.2 in).

Khadakwasla Lake was already 90% full, with water flowing in freely from Varasgaon, besides the abundant rainfall. The people of Pune had no inkling of their fate. The rain caused such a rapid rise of the reservoir water level at Panshet that the new embankment could not adjust to the dangerous loading condition. Water rose at the rate of 9 m (30 ft) per day initially, and 24 m (79 ft) in 12 days. Due to incomplete rough outlet surface, the flow through was unsteady which caused pressure surges. Cracks were formed along the edges of the right angles to the axis of the dam causing a subsidence 9 m (30 ft) wide, leaving the crest of the dam 0.6 m (2.0 ft) above the reservoir level on 11 July. The failure was attributed to inadequate provision of the outlet facility during emergency. This caused the fateful collapse of the structure above the outlets.

Panshet Dam had been cleared for construction under the aegis of the Bombay State Irrigation Department. When the State split into Maharashtra and Gujarat in 1960, Panshet Dam came under the supervision of Maharashtra State Irrigation Department. Mr. SM Bhalerao was the executive engineer in charge of Panshet dam, and Mr. MR Panse (both deceased), the plant engineer. They were running out of time, since this project was their first major assignment and the area of work hostile. Former secretary of the state irrigation department, Madhukar Deshmukh, who had worked as a deputy engineer at Panshet dam till late 1959, explained what actually went wrong. According to him, the dam was planned as a fully earthen one with a height of 61 m (200 ft). Given the nature of the dam, an outlet to the downstream Khadakwasla reservoir was created at its base. Deshmukh said, "Ideally, the arch of the conduit should have been made from RCC. However, in those days, steel was in short supply and we were forced to use concrete blocks instead." The force of the water was so great that it managed to dislodge the concrete blocks, which resulted in the earthen portion of the dam giving way. They had made a desperate appeal for help and manpower augmentation, and the Area Commander, Southern Command, Lieutenant-General Chaudhari reacted swiftly, keeping Commandant NDA, Rear Admiral BA Samson in the loop. Assistance was provided using a semi-prepared road from Peacock Bay, NDA to Panshet along the Mutha river/backwaters of Khadakwasla Lake and also via Mulshi Lake. Engineering officers from BEG, College Of Military Engineering (CME) and close to 3,000 personnel moved out just after sunset.

3,000 soldiers from the Bombay Engineer Group and Centre (BEG), the College of Military Engineering (CME) and other units were dispatched by HQ Southern Command, Pune, to help. They formed a human chain at Panshet Dam, as Army and commandeered civil trucks brought sandbags by the tens of thousands to shore up Panshet Dam. The engineers were certain the dam would collapse; they were praying that the Armed Forces personnel's aid would delay the inevitable to dawn, so that the people of Pune could be warned in time and those living on the banks of the rivers Mutha and Mula could be evacuated. Despite their best efforts, Panshet Dam caved in at 0330 hrs on 12 July 1961. Khadakwasla Dam was the last barrier. The dam stood firm till well past dawn, contributing to the safety of residents living downstream in the vicinity of the path of least resistance to the surging freestream water.

It took another four hours for Khadakwasla Dam to breach, causing devastating floods in Pune. A 120 m (390 ft) central section of the dam gave way. Word had been passed around the few people living on the swampy land next to the two canals early in the morning. The authorities started moving out the residents living near the riverside. Many residents fled to higher grounds, some all the way to the Parvati Hill. Apparently, All India Radio did not broadcast any warnings, and was playing a regular scheduled music program when the floods struck. The low-lying areas of the old city were almost completely submerged. Except for the rail bridge of the Sangam Bridges, two adjacent bridges built separately for rail and road traffic and Bund Garden Bridge, all other bridges were under water as well. Water rushed into the old ‘Peths’ and along Karve Road, Deccan Gymkhana areas. For many hours, the high water levels persisted. Roughly speaking, Panshet water reservoir stores enough water for all of Pune's city needs today (today's needs are probably 8-10 times more than the requirements of the 1960s).

After the water receded fully, some three days later, the stench of the aftermath of flooding stayed on for nearly three months. A large number of people sold their land and houses at rock-bottom prices and moved away. Pune's development plans were put on hold till normalcy was achieved. Bhalerao and Panse were blamed for oversight and lack of common sense in not constructing a wide reinforced archway in the centre of the mudwork dam for water to flow through. The old riverside city landscape changed forever. New localities (such as Lokmanya Nagar, Gokhale Nagar, etc.) were set up to resettle some of the flood affected citizens. Most of the bridges were damaged and needed fixing and in some cases complete rebuilding.

The dam was later rebuilt over four years. In this period, residents of Pune and its suburbs had to face water rationing. While Pune city, Camp and Cantonment area were not too severely affected, people in Khadki (Kirkee), Dapodi, Bopodi, Phugewadi, Hadapsar, Shivajinagar and Deccan Gymkhana had limited water supply. At the National Defence Academy (NDA), Peacock Bay, the Naval cadets training section and the lakeside guest rooms were submerged. The view from the NDA Commandant's house, which overlooks the entire lake and dam, was distressing.
