= Panshet Dam =

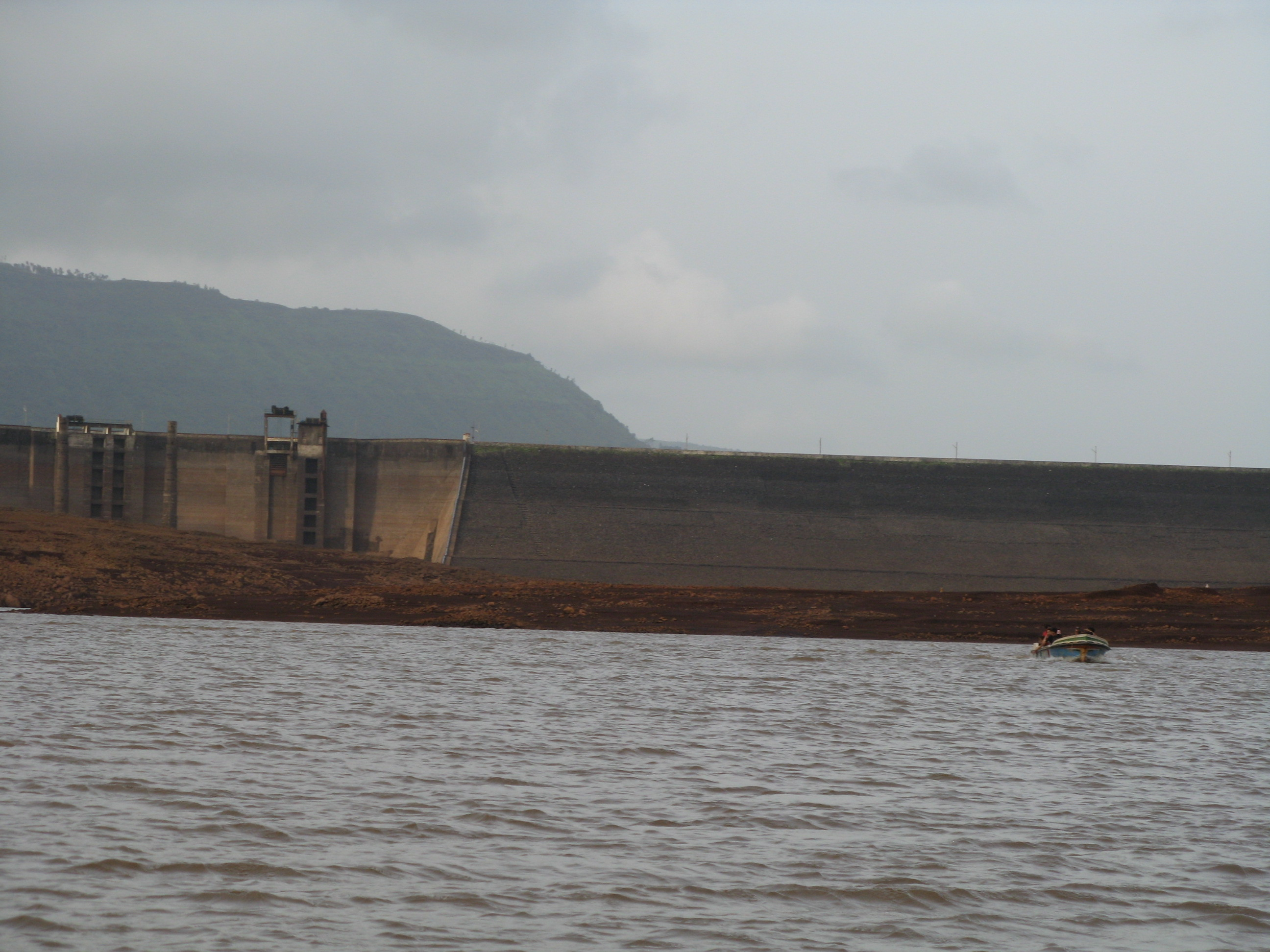
- Panshet Dam

- Location within Maharashtra
- Official name: Panshet Dam; Tanajisagar Dam
- Location: Velhe Pune District, Maharashtra, India
- Coordinates: 18°22′47″N 73°36′40″E
- Opening date: 1972
- Construction cost: 200 crore (estimated)
- Owners: Government of Maharashtra, India

Dam and spillways
- Type of dam: Earthfill; Gravity
- Impounds: Ambi river
- Height: 63.56 m (208.5 ft)
- Length: 1,039 m (3,409 ft)
- Dam volume: 4.190 km^{3} (1.005 cu mi)

Panshet Dam, also called Tanajisagar Dam, is a dam on the Ambi river, a tributary of the Mutha River, about 50 km (31 mi) southwest of the city of Pune in western India. The dam was constructed in late 1950s for irrigation and, along with three other dams nearby, Varasgaon, Temghar and Khadakwasla, it supplies drinking water to Pune.

== History ==
The Panshet Dam burst on 12 July 1961, during its first year of storing water. The failure occurred when the dam wall gave way due to the complete lack of reinforced cement concrete (RCC) reinforcement in the conduit passing through the earthen structure. Instead of using RCC, plain unreinforced concrete blocks were installed, owing to a shortage of steel at the time. This critical design compromise led to a catastrophic failure, resulting in massive flooding in Pune and an estimated death toll of around 1,000 people.

== Location ==
It is about 50 km (31 mi) from Pune and about 180 km (110 mi) from Mumbai.

== Specifications ==
The height of the dam above its lowest foundation is 63.56 m (208.5 ft) while the length is 1,039 m (3,409 ft). The volume content is 4.190 km^{3} (1.005 cu mi) and gross storage capacity is 303,000 m^{3} (10,700,000 cu ft).

== See also ==
- List of dams and reservoirs in Maharashtra
- List of dams and reservoirs in India
