= Varasgaon Dam =

- Location within Maharashtra
- Official name: Varasgaon Dam
- Location: Pune District, Maharashtra, India
- Coordinates: 18°23′13″N 73°36′45″E

Dam and spillways
- Impounds: Mutha River

Varasgaon is a dam on the Mosi River which supplies water to city of Pune, Maharashtra, India. It is also called Veer Baaji Pasalkar Dam. It is one of the three major dams which provide water to Pune city. It is located around 40 km (25 mi) from Pune city. The Panshet Dam is nearby, and together both have become a popular picnic spots.

During the monsoon or just after monsoon the hills around are lush green with plenty of waterfalls. Water sports are also played in this dam.

== Impact of Lavasa ==
About 30 minutes from Varasgaon is Lavasa whose construction was halted by the Bombay High Court on 7 December 2010, partially due to the proximity as it is feared that it could lead to contamination of water supply to Pune. Apart from this, around 18 indigenous tribal villages were displaced with meager or no compensation due to the Lavasa project. Villagers have reported misappropriation of land (in the name of agricultural irrigation) through compensation cheques that bounced on depositing and agents that threaten the locals with death if the land wasn't sold to them. Some were relocated to hill tops where Varasgaon water was then supplied to them by tankers.
