= Pune Cantonment Board =

Military administered civic body in Pune.

The Seal of the Pune Cantonment Board

Pune Cantonment Board is the administrative body for the region of Camp Cantonment in the city of Pune, India. It was established in the year 1817. This cantonment is a Class I Cantonment as per the Cantonments Act, 2006 by the Government of India.
