= Mutha River =

River in Maharashtra, India

Coordinates: 18°31′51″N 73°51′38″E

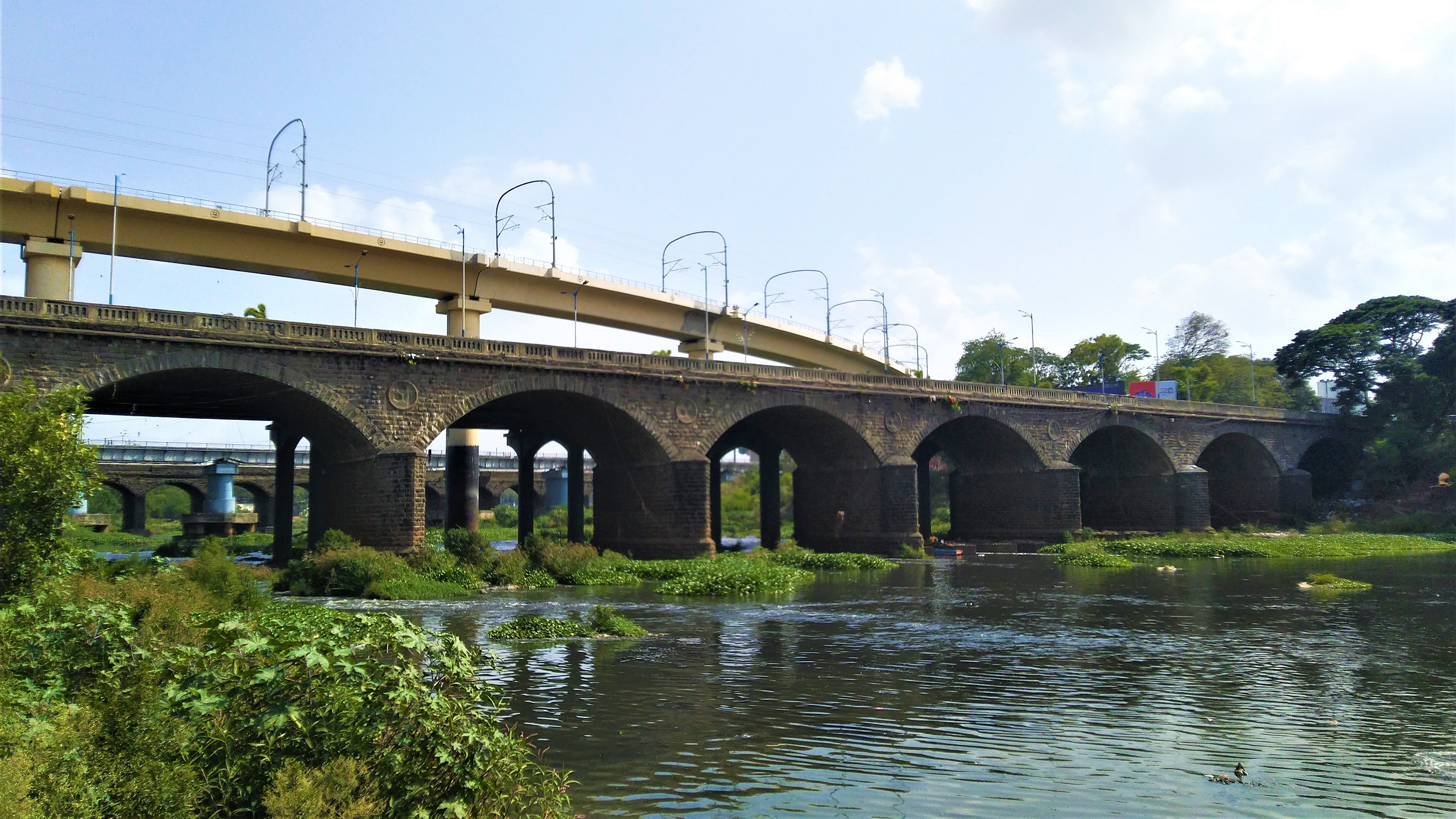
- Mutha River as seen from Sangam Ghat

Physical characteristics
- Source
  - location: Pune, Sahyadri, Maharashtra
- Mouth: Mula-Mutha River
  - location: Sangamwadi, Pune District, Pune city, Maharashtra, India
- Length: 36 km (22 mi)

Basin features
- Tributaries
  - right: Ambi river, Mosi river

The Mutha River is a river in western Maharashtra, India. It arises in the Western Ghats and flows eastward until it merges with the Mula River in the city of Pune. It is dammed twice, first at the Panshet Dam (on the Ambi River), used as a source of drinking water and irrigation for Pune city. The water released here is dammed again at Khadakwasla and is an important source of drinking water for Pune. One more dam has been built later on the Mutha river at Temghar.

After merging with the Mula River in Pune, the Mutha flows on as the Mula-Mutha River to join the Bhima River.

In 2014, the Government of Maharashtra announced that the Pune Municipal Corporation would build new sewage treatment plants to ensure that no sewage was dumped in the river.

== Government documents, orders and court orders ==
The National Green Tribunal (NGT) of India has the power to hear all cases relating to issues of the river under the Water (Prevention and Control of Pollution) Act, 1974 and the Water (Prevention and Control of Pollution) Cess Act, 1977.

Considering the serious nature of encroachments on the Mutha river, the NGT in its latest order on 23 July 2019 ordered a committee to be formed to look into these issues. The committee will comprise (i) the Chief Engineer, Water Resources Department (Government of Maharashtra), (ii) the District Collector, Pune, (iii) the Member Secretary, Maharashtra Pollution Control Board, (iv) the SEIAA, Maharashtra and (v) a Senior Scientist from the CPCB, Regional Office at Pune. The committee will decide the appropriate measures.

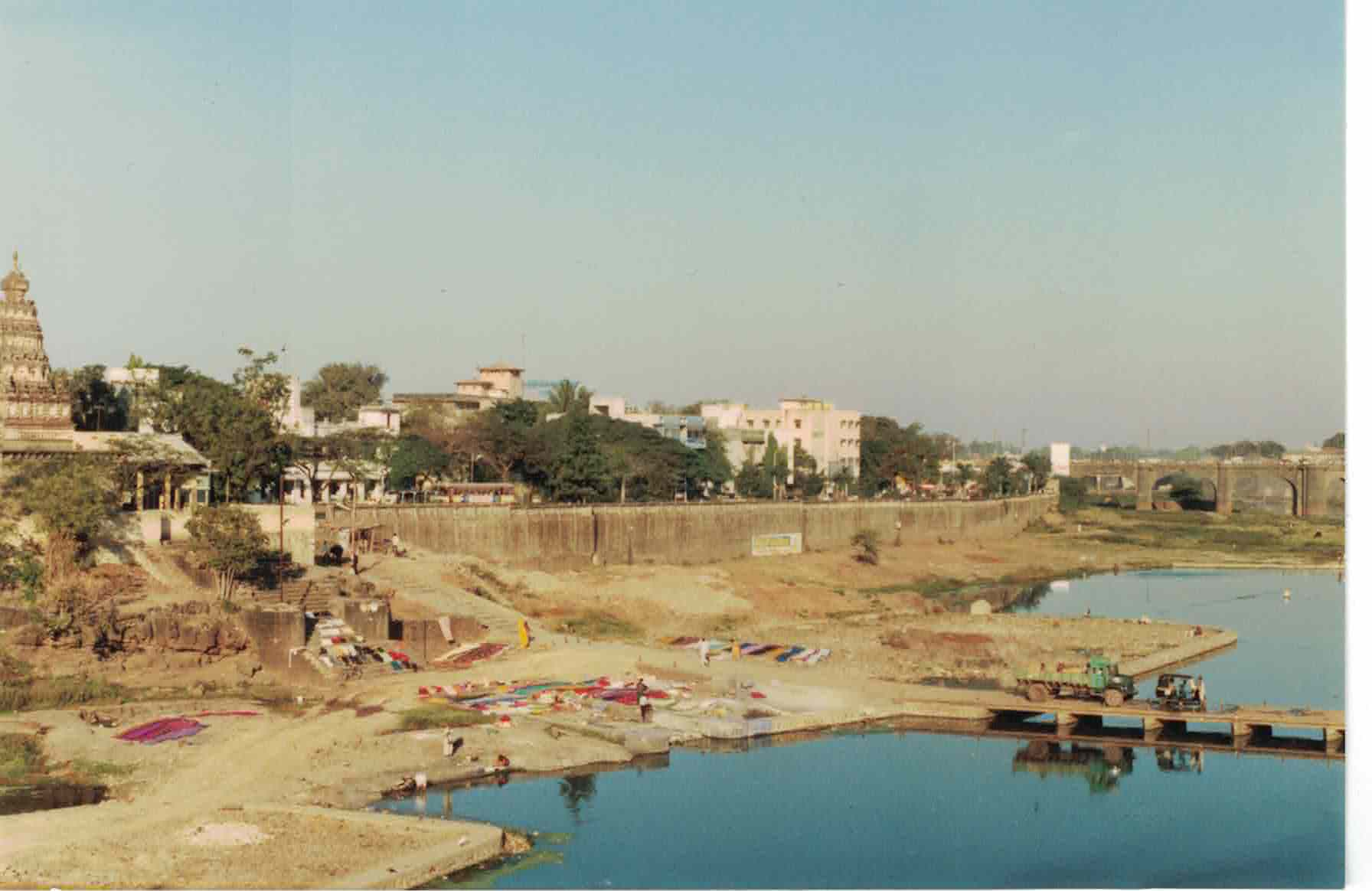
The Mutha River between Onkareshwar temple and Shivaji bridge in the 1980s
