= Temghar Dam =

Dam in Maharashtra, India

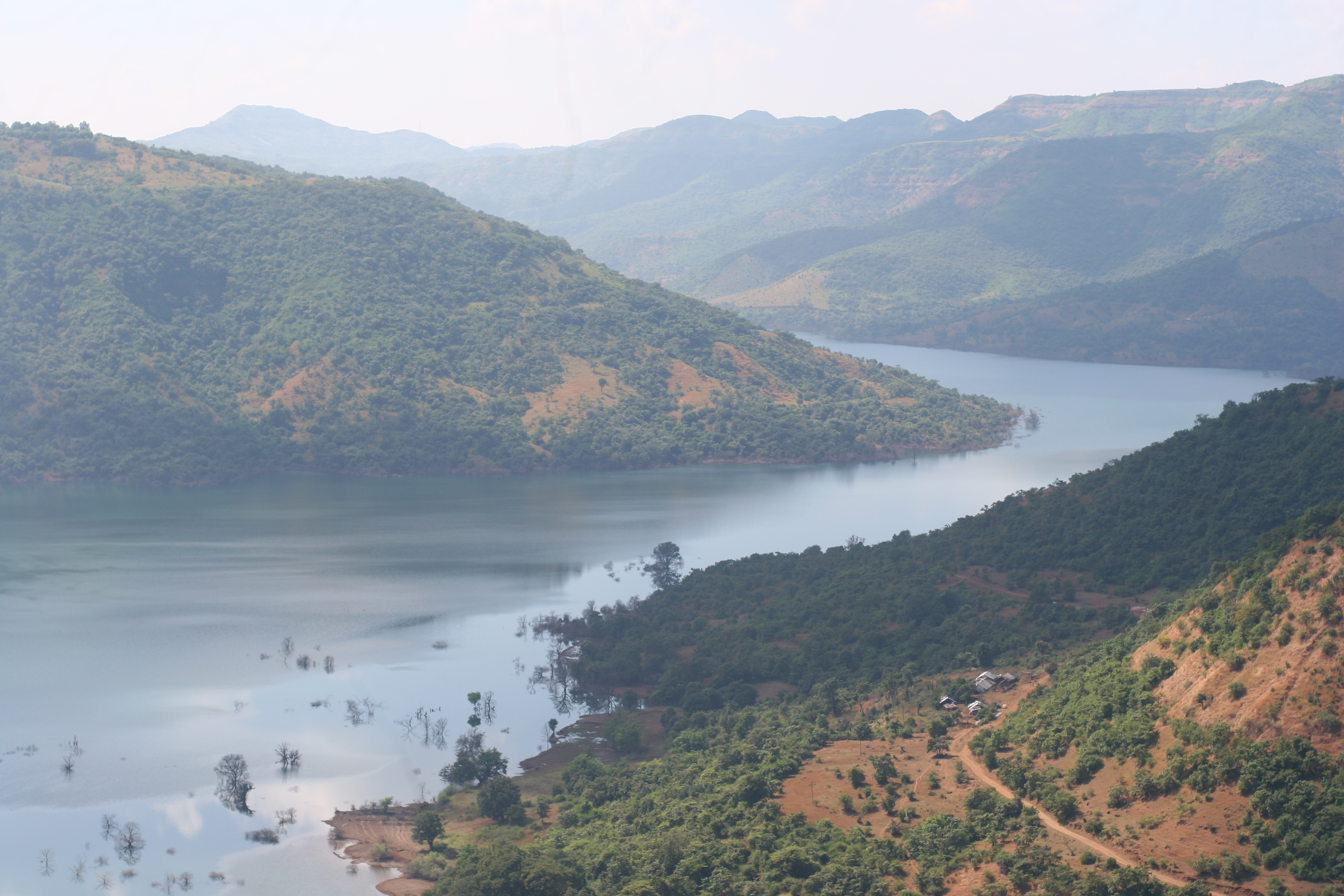
- View from the hills overlooking Temghar Reservoir

- Location within Maharashtra
- Official name: Temghar Dam D03029
- Location: Mulshi
- Coordinates: 18.452580°N 73.555784°E
- Opening date: 2000
- Owners: Government of Maharashtra, India

Dam and spillways
- Type of dam: Earthfill; Gravity
- Impounds: Mula river
- Height: 42.5 m (139 ft)
- Length: 1,075 m (3,527 ft)
- Dam volume: 1,188,000 m^{3} (42,000,000 cu ft)

Reservoir
- Total capacity: 101,010,000 m^{3} (3.567×10^{9} cu ft)
- Surface area: 55,512 km^{2} (21,433 sq mi)

Power Station
- Commission date: 2019
- Turbines: Horizontal Francis
- Installed capacity: 1 X 4 MW
- Annual generation: 16.02 MU

Temghar Dam, is an earthfill and gravity dam on Mutha river near Mulashi, Pune district in the state of Maharashtra in India.

== Specifications ==
The height of the dam above its lowest foundation is 42.5 m (139 ft) while the length is 1,075 m (3,527 ft). The volume content is 1,188,000 m^{3} (42,000,000 cu ft) and gross storage capacity is 107,900,000.00 m^{3} (3.810452539×10^{9} cu ft).

== Purpose ==
- Irrigation
- Power Generation

== Leakage ==
There are leakages in Temghar Dam wall which are believed to be dangerous to the dam. The leakage has increased than before according to media report. However the Maharashtra government authorities state that the dam is safe and they will soon solve the leakage problem. Girish Mahajan, Maharashtra state water resource minister stated said that inquiry about this issue will also carried out as this dam was opened in 2001 and leakages started in just 15 years. However care needs to be taken to prevent Panshet dam tragedy in 1961.

== Power Station ==
The Hydro Power Plant of 1 X 4 MW installed capacity has been set up at Dam Toe in year 2017 and commissioned in the year 2019. One unit of Horizontal Francis Turbine with Synchronous Generator has been installed. The electricity produced is being evacuated to nearest MSETCL's Pirangut Substation.

== See also ==
- Dams in Maharashtra
- List of reservoirs and dams in India
