= Pune =

City in Maharashtra, India

Pune Puṇē (Marathi) Poona
- Metropolis
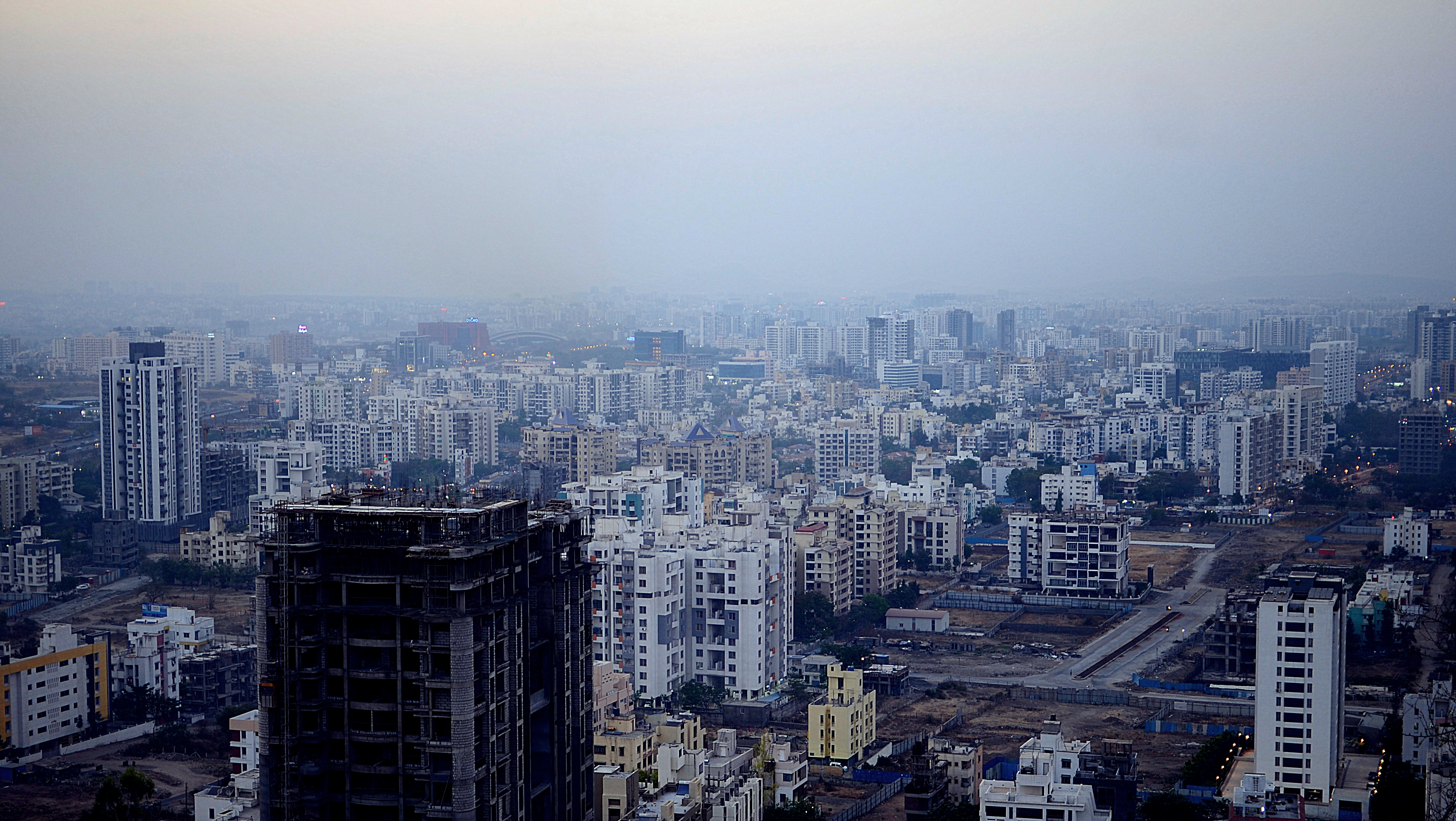
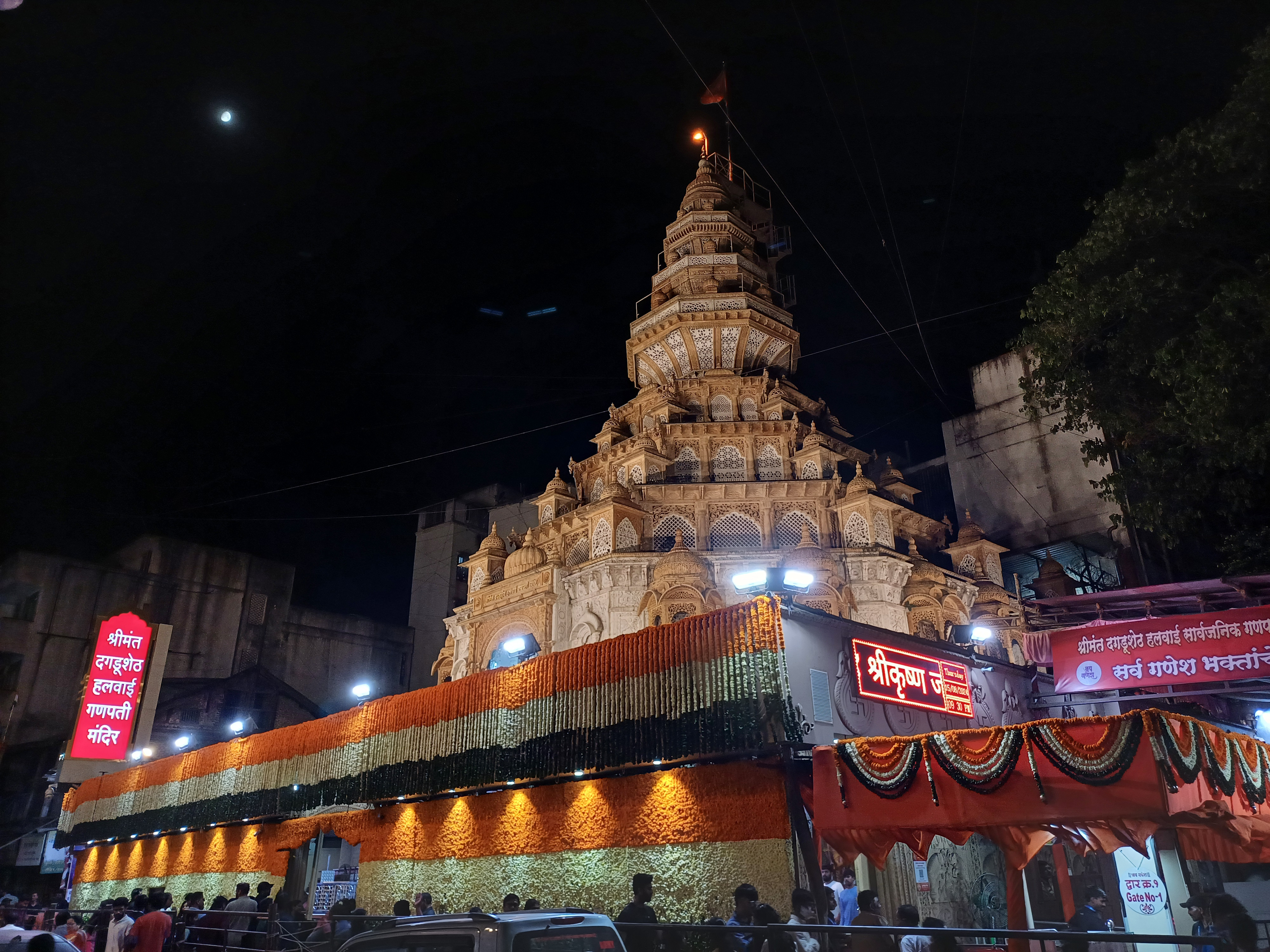
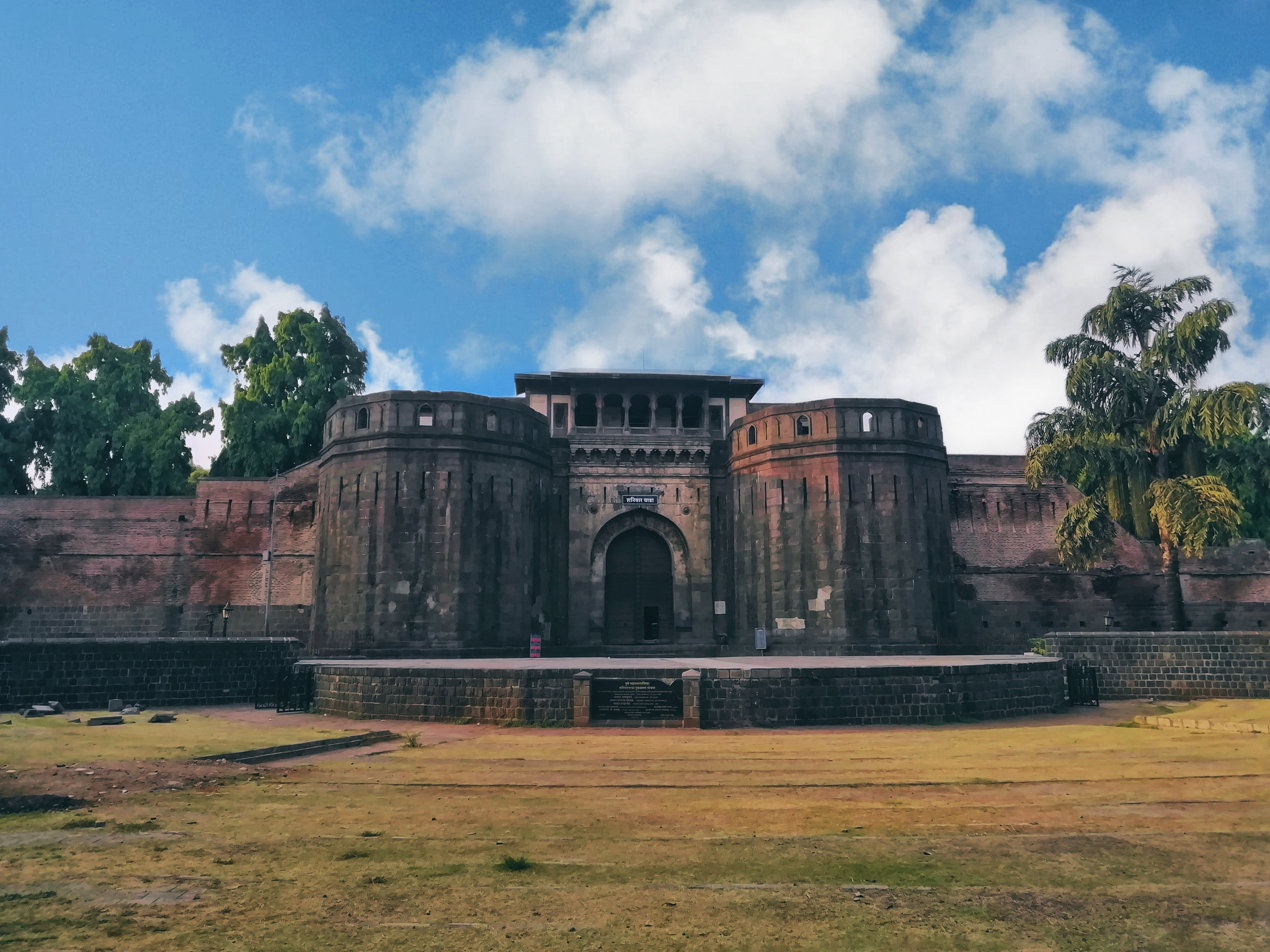
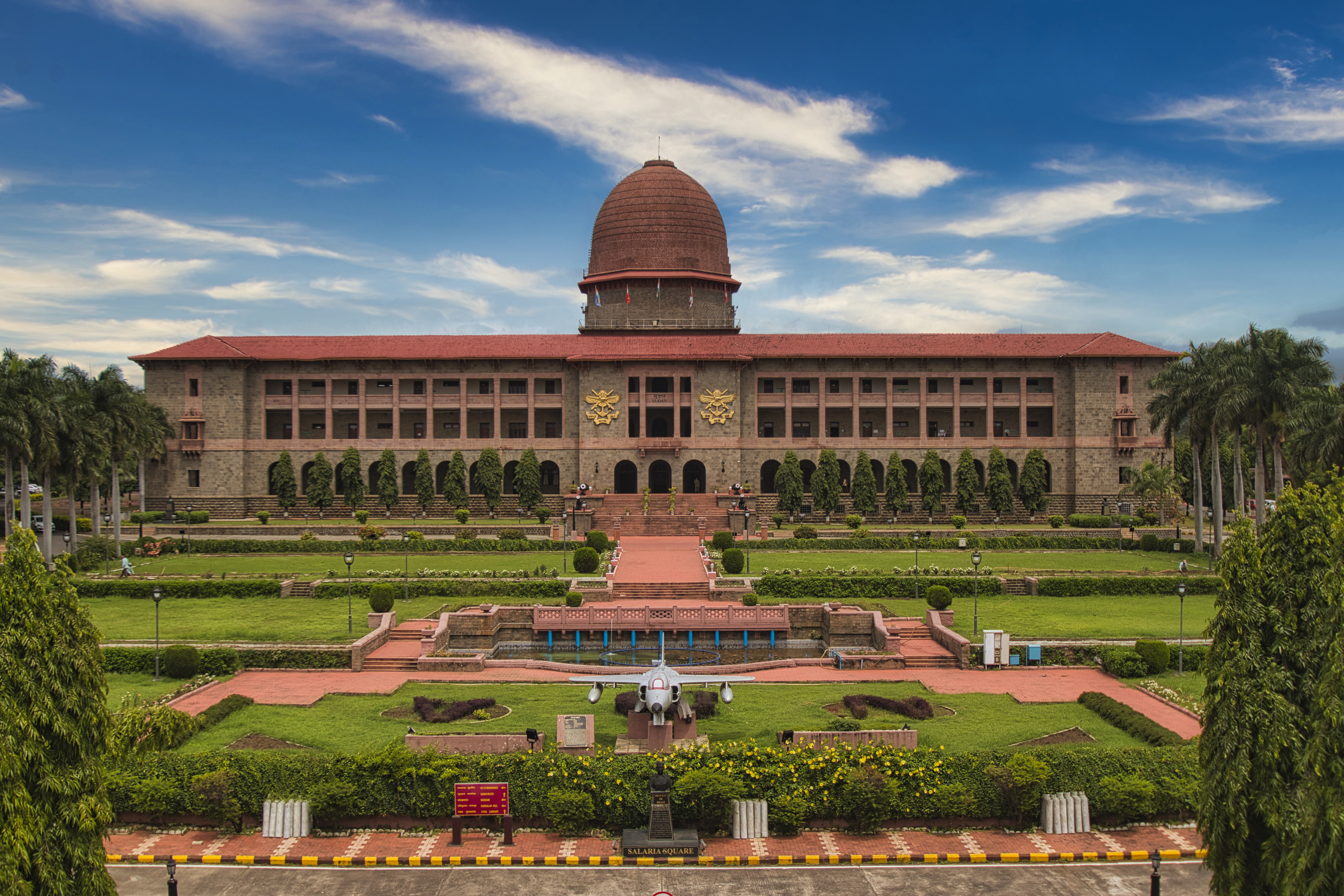
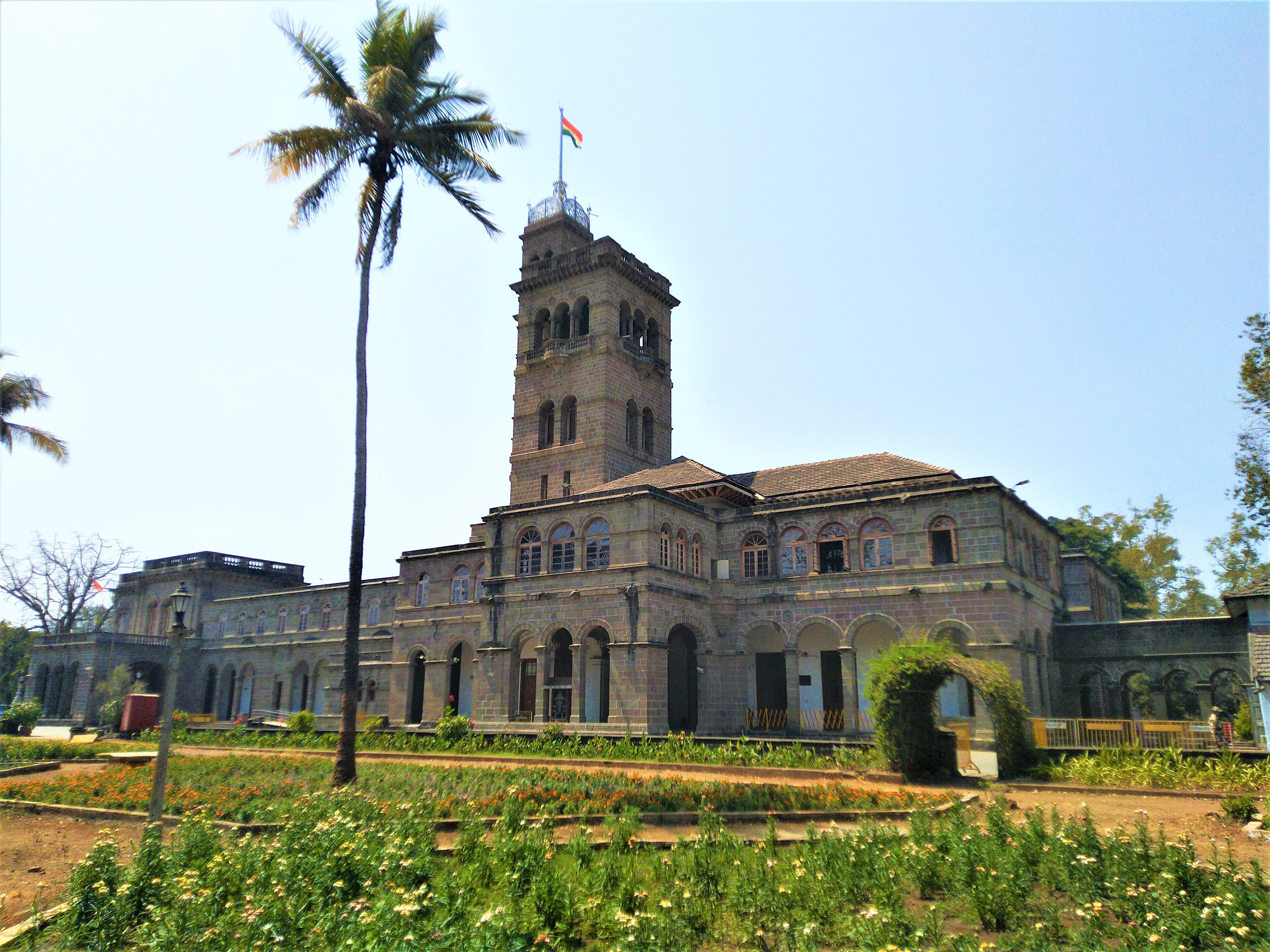
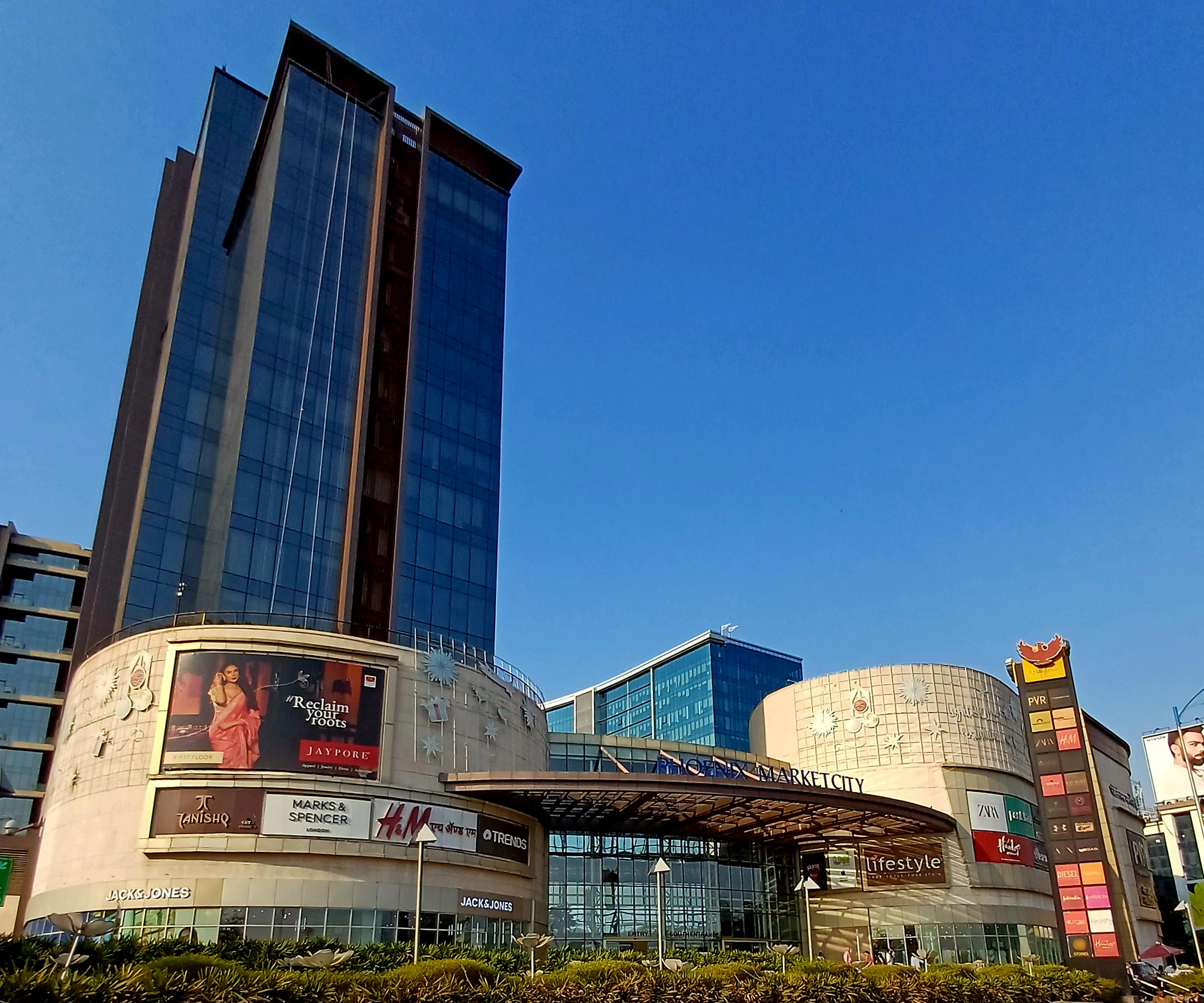
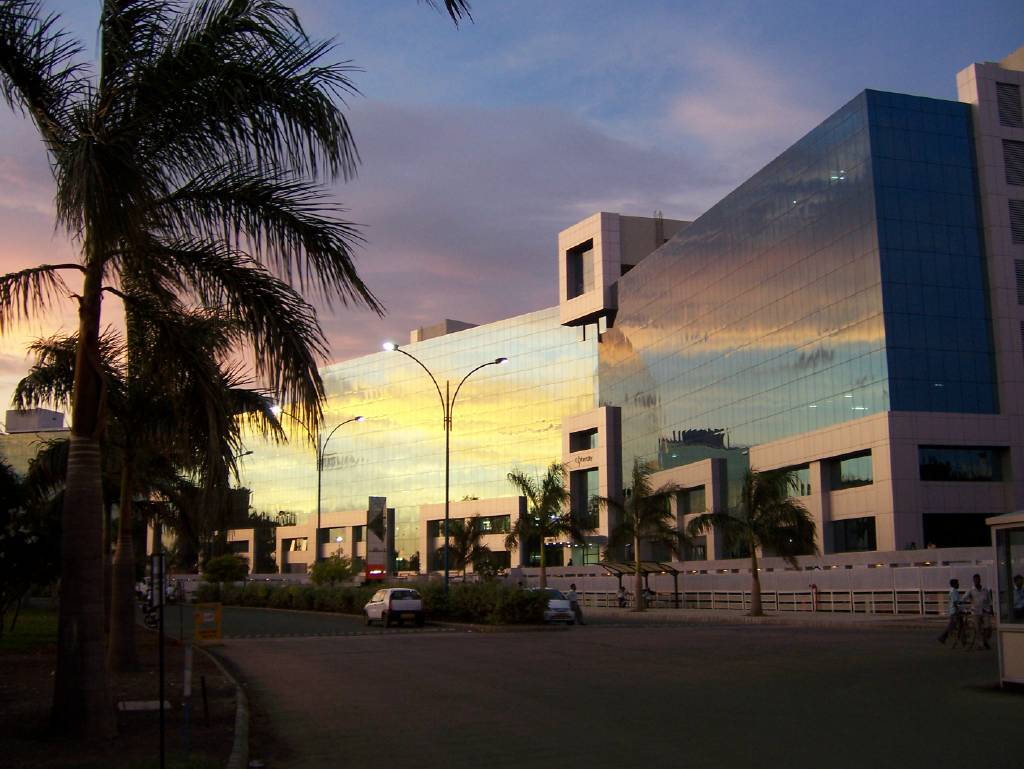
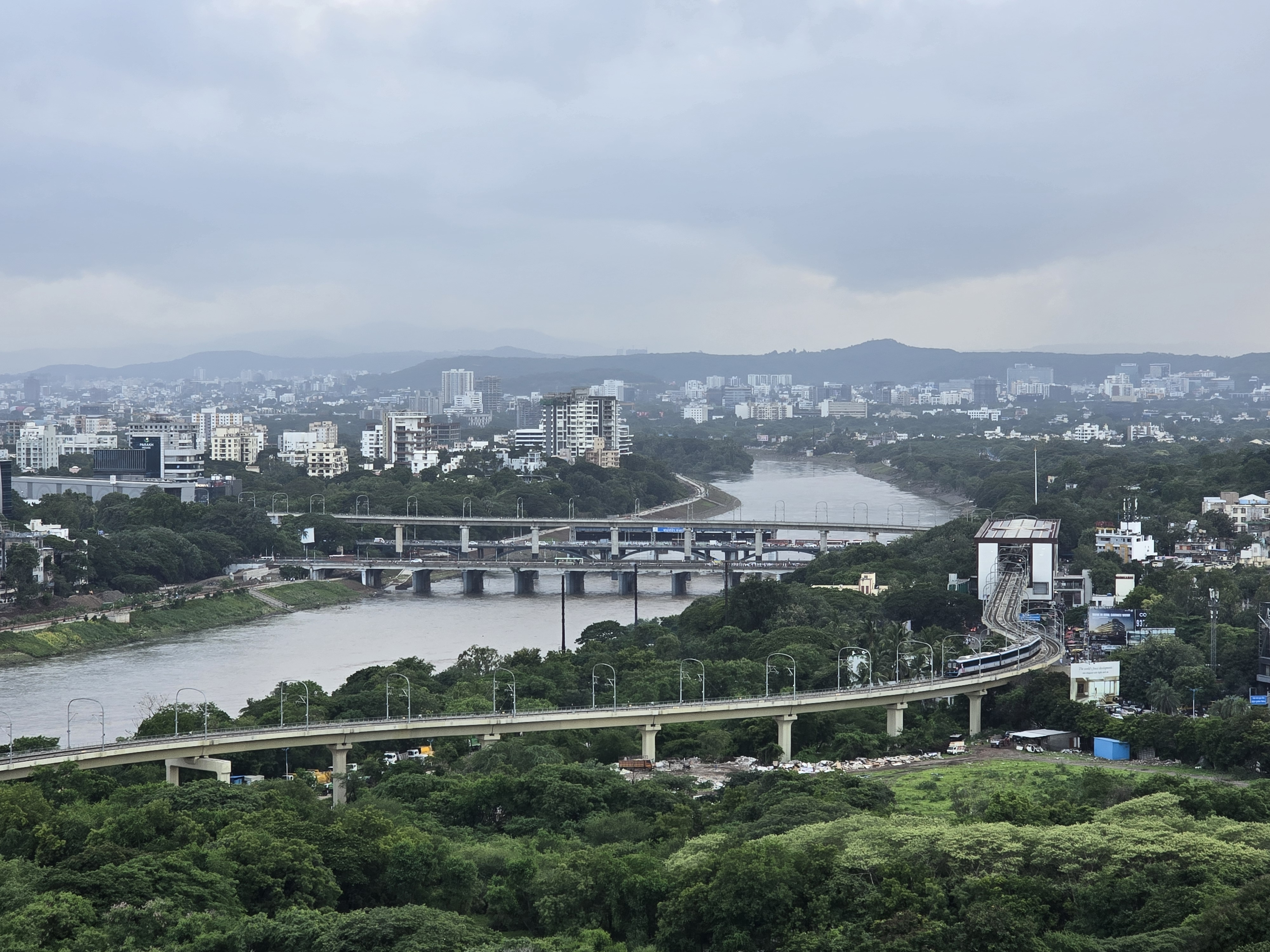
- Skyline of Pune West Dagdusheth Ganapati Temple Shaniwar Wada National Defence Academy University of Pune Viman Nagar Magarpatta CyberCity Pune Metro alongside Mula-Mutha River

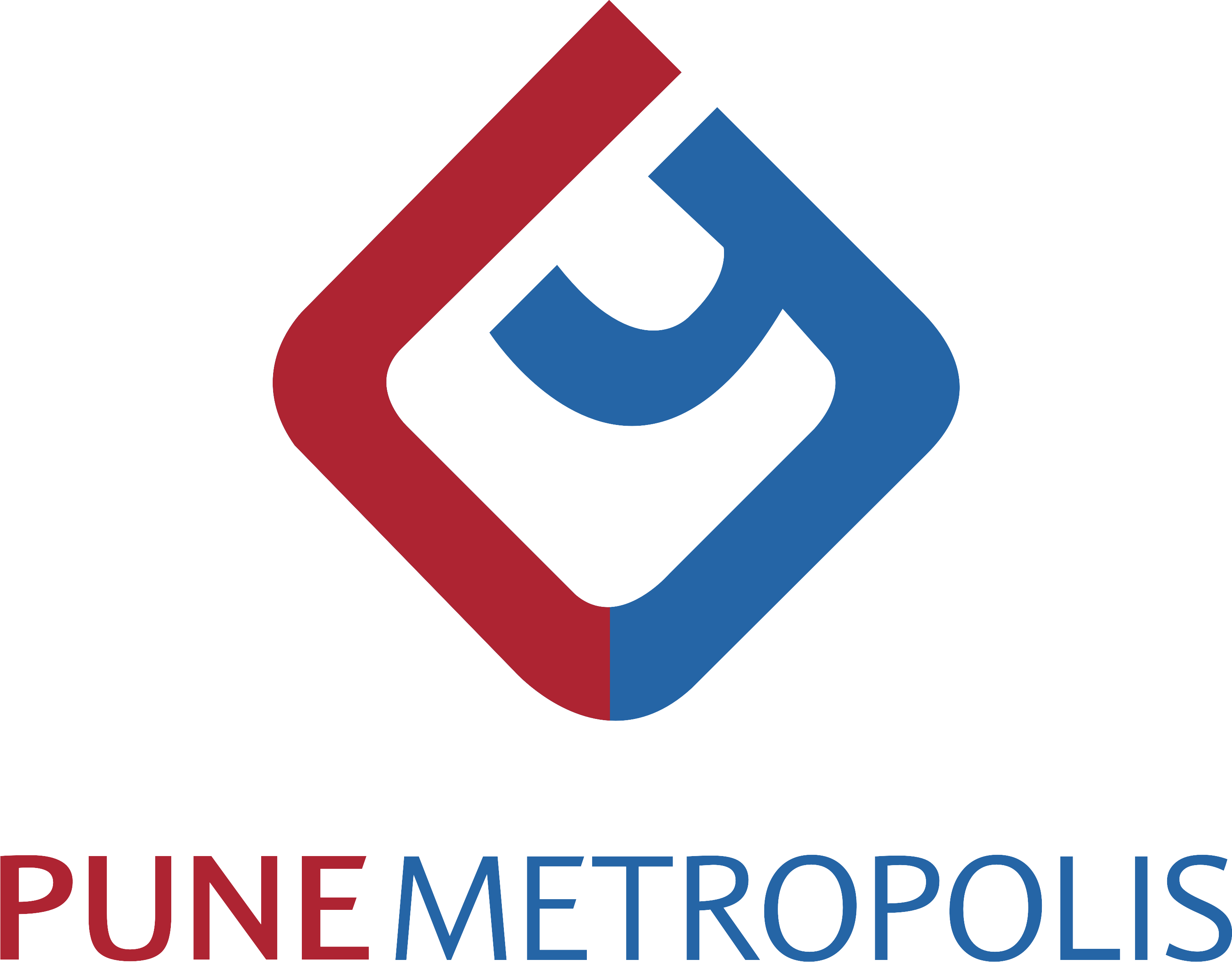
- Nicknames: Oxford of the East, The Queen of Deccan, Detroit of the East
- Interactive map of Pune
- Location within Maharashtra Location within India
- Coordinates: 18°31′16″N 73°51′19″E
- Country: India
- State: Maharashtra
- Division: Desh
- District: Pune
- Established: 758 CE

Government
  - Type: Municipal Corporation
  - Body: Pune Municipal Corporation
  - Mayor: Manjusha Nagpure (BJP)

Area
  - Pune MC: 516.18 km^{2} (199.30 sq mi)
  - Pune MR: 7,256.46 km^{2} (2,801.73 sq mi)
- Elevation: 570.62 m (1,872.1 ft)

Population
  - Pune MC: 6,200,000
  - Pune MC density: 12,000/km^{2} (31,000/sq mi)
  - Pune MR: 7,276,000
  - Pune MR density: 1,003/km^{2} (2,597/sq mi)
- Demonym(s): Punekar, Poonaite
- Time zone: UTC+5:30 (IST)
- PIN Code(s): 411001 – 411090
- Area code: 020
- Vehicle registration: MH-12 PMC, Pune; MH-14 PCMC, Pune
- Official language: Marathi (Note: The Hindi and English languages are also used for official purposes as per the Maharashtra Official Languages Act, 1964.)
- International airports: Pune International Airport (PNQ)
- Transit: Rapid Transit: Pune Metro; Commuter rail: Pune Suburban Railway; BRTS: PMPML
- Urban Planning Authority: Pune Metropolitan Region Development Authority
- GDP: $78 billion
- Website: pune.gov.in

Pune (Marathi: Puṇē, pronounced [ˈpuɳeː]), previously spelled in English as Poona (the official name until 1978), is a city in the state of Maharashtra in the Deccan Plateau in Western India. It is the administrative headquarters of the Pune district, and of Pune division. In terms of the total amount of land under its jurisdiction, Pune is the largest city in Maharashtra by area, with a geographical area of 516.18km^{2}, though by population it comes in a distant second to Mumbai. The city of Pune is part of Pune Metropolitan Region, which according to the 2011 Census of India, has 7.2 million residents, making it the seventh-most populous metropolitan area in India. Pune is one of the largest IT hubs in India. It is also one of the most important automobile and manufacturing hubs of India. Pune is often referred to as the "Oxford of the East" because of its educational institutions. It has been ranked "the most liveable city in India" several times.

Pune at different points in time has been ruled by the Rashtrakuta dynasty, Ahmadnagar Sultanate, the Mughals, and the Adil Shahi dynasty. In the 18th century, the city was part of the Maratha Empire, and the seat of the Peshwas, the prime ministers of the Maratha Empire. Pune was seized by the British East India Company in the Third Anglo-Maratha War; it gained municipal status in 1858, the year in which Crown rule began. Many historical landmarks like Shaniwarwada, Shinde Chhatri, and Vishrambaug Wada date to this era. Historical sites from different eras dot the city.

Pune has historically been a major cultural centre, with important figures like Dnyaneshwar, Shivaji, Tukaram, Baji Rao I, Balaji Baji Rao, Madhavrao I, Nana Fadnavis, Mahadev Govind Ranade, Gopal Krishna Gokhale, Mahatma Jyotirao Phule, Savitribai Phule, Gopal Ganesh Agarkar, Tarabai Shinde, Dhondo Keshav Karve, and Pandita Ramabai doing their life's work in Pune City or in an area that falls in Pune Metropolitan Region. Pune was a major centre of resistance to the British Raj, with people like Gopal Krishna Gokhale and Bal Gangadhar Tilak playing leading roles in the struggle for Indian independence.

== Etymology ==
The earliest reference to Pune is an inscription on a Rashtrakuta Dynasty copper plate dated 937 CE, which refers to the town as Punya-vishaya. By the 13th century, it had come to be known as Punawadi.

During the Rashtrakuta dynasty, the city was referred to as Punnaka and Punyapur. The copper plates of 758 and 768 CE show that the Yadava dynasty had renamed the city as Punakavishaya and Punya Vishaya. 'Vishaya' means land, while 'Punaka' and 'Punya' mean holy. The city was known as Kasbe Pune during the reign of the Maratha king, Shivaji's father, Shahaji. Mughal emperor Aurangzeb renamed a small neighbourhood in central part of the old city as Muhiyabad (the only divergent naming) some time between 1703 and 1705 in memory of his great-grandson Muhi-ul-Milan, who died there. The name Muhiyabad was reverted soon after Aurangzeb's death. Anglicized to Poona in 1857 by the English during British rule, the city's name was changed to Pune in 1978.

== History ==
=== Early and medieval period ===
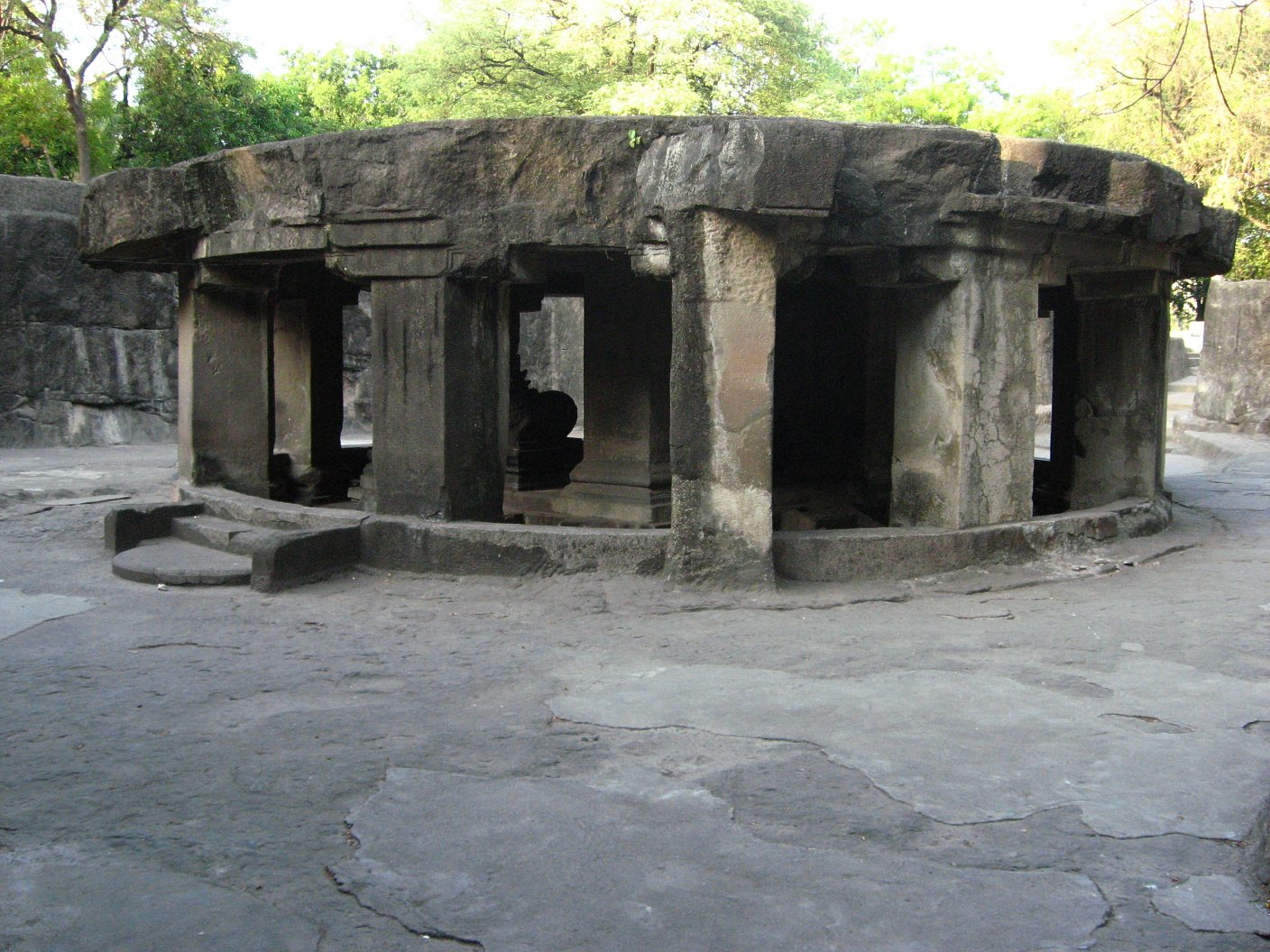
The circular Nandi mandapa at the Pataleshwar Caves temple built in the Rashtrakuta era (753–982)

Copper plates dated 858 and 868 CE show that by the 9th century an agricultural settlement known as Punnaka existed at the location of the modern Pune. The plates indicate that this region was ruled by the Rashtrakuta dynasty. The Pataleshwar Caves rock-cut temple complex was built during this era. Pune was part of the territory ruled by the Seuna Yadavas of Devagiri from the 9th century to 1327. Pune was under control of various Muslim sultanates until the late 1600s.

=== The Maratha Empire ===
Pune was part of the Jagir (fiefdom) granted by the Nizamshahi (Ahmadnagar Sultanate) to Maloji Bhosale in 1599. Maloji Bhosale passed on Jagir of Pune to his son Shahaji Bhosale. The town was destroyed by Murar Jagdeo, a general from the rival Adil Shahi dynasty in 1636. After the Mughal-Nijamshahi war, Shahaji soon joined Adilshahi as a political compulsion and regained the Pune jagir. At that time he selected the town for the residence of his wife Jijabai, and young son Shivaji, the future founder of the Maratha empire. The Lal Mahal residence of Jiajabai and Shivaji was completed in 1640 AD. Shivaji spent his young years at the Lal Mahal. Jijabai is said to have commissioned the building of the Kasba Ganapati temple. The Ganesha idol consecrated at this temple has been regarded as the presiding deity (Gramadevata) of the city.

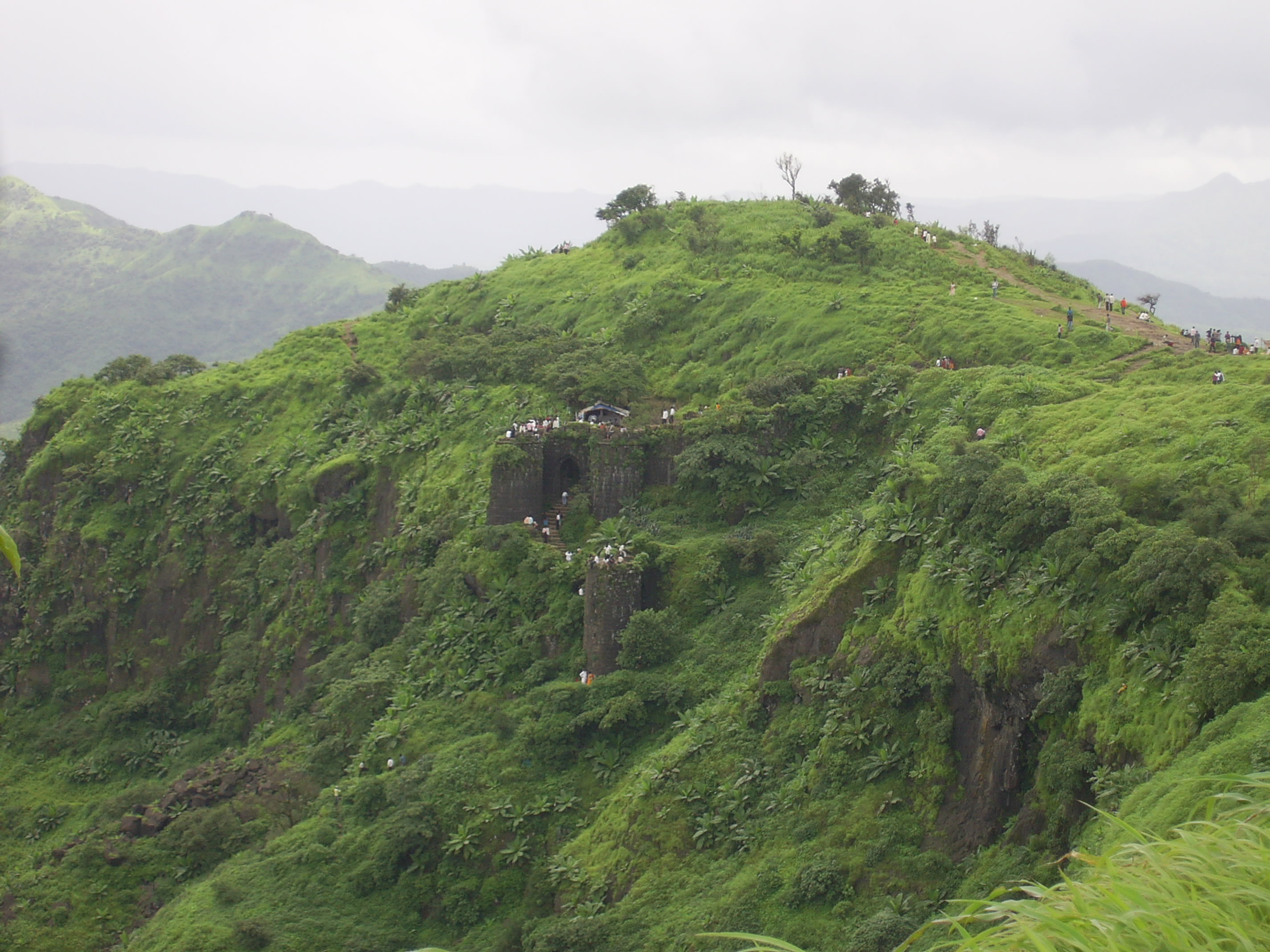
The Sinhagad fort is known for Battle of Sinhagad on 4 February 1670

Pune changed hands between the Mughals and the Marathas many times during the rest of the 1600s. Recognizing the military potential of Pune, the Mughal general Shaista Khan and later, the emperor Aurangzeb further developed the areas around the town. Pune was occupied again by Marathas in June 1670, four months to the battle of Sinhagad and remained in the hands of Marathas. From 1703 to 1705, towards the end of the 27-year-long Mughal–Maratha Wars, the town was occupied by Mughal emperor Aurangzeb and its name was changed temporarily to Muhiyabad. This name was abandoned and reverted to its original name soon after Aurangzeb's death.

=== Peshwa rule ===
In 1720, Baji Rao I was appointed Peshwa (prime minister) of the Maratha Empire by Shahu I, the fifth Chhatrapati of the Maratha Empire. As the Peshwa, Bajirao moved his base from Saswad to Pune in 1728, marking the beginning of the transformation of what was a kasbah into a city. He also commissioned the construction of the Shaniwar Wada on the high grounds of right bank of the Mutha River. The construction was completed in 1730, ushering in the era of Peshwa control of the city. Bajirao's son and successor, Nanasaheb constructed a lake at Katraj on the outskirts of the city and an underground aqueduct to bring water from the lake to Shaniwar Wada and the city. The aqueduct was still in working order in 2004.

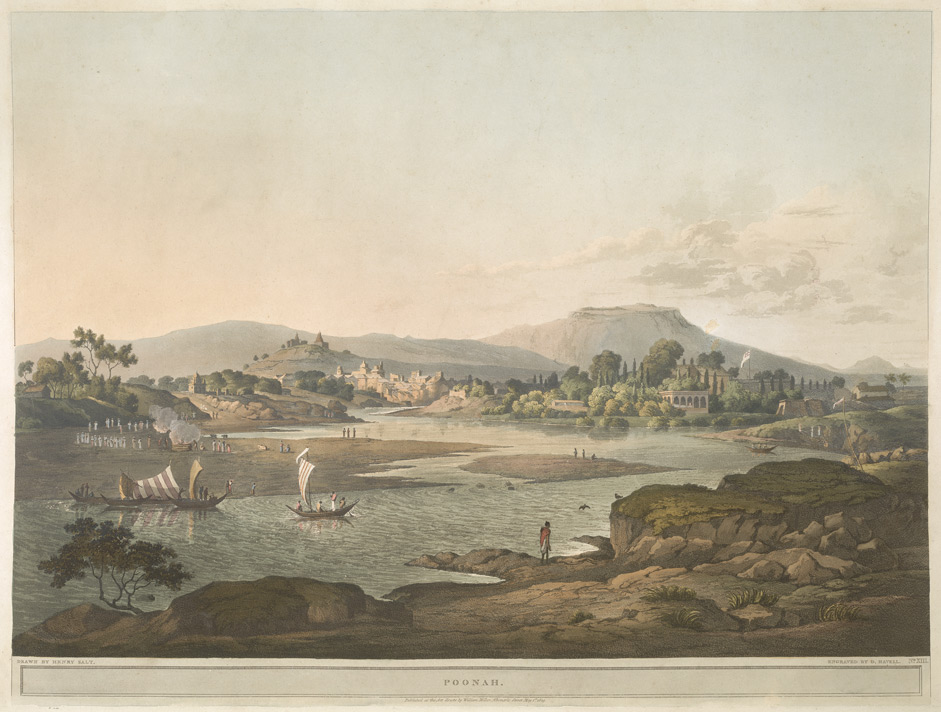
Sangamwadi, Poona in 1809

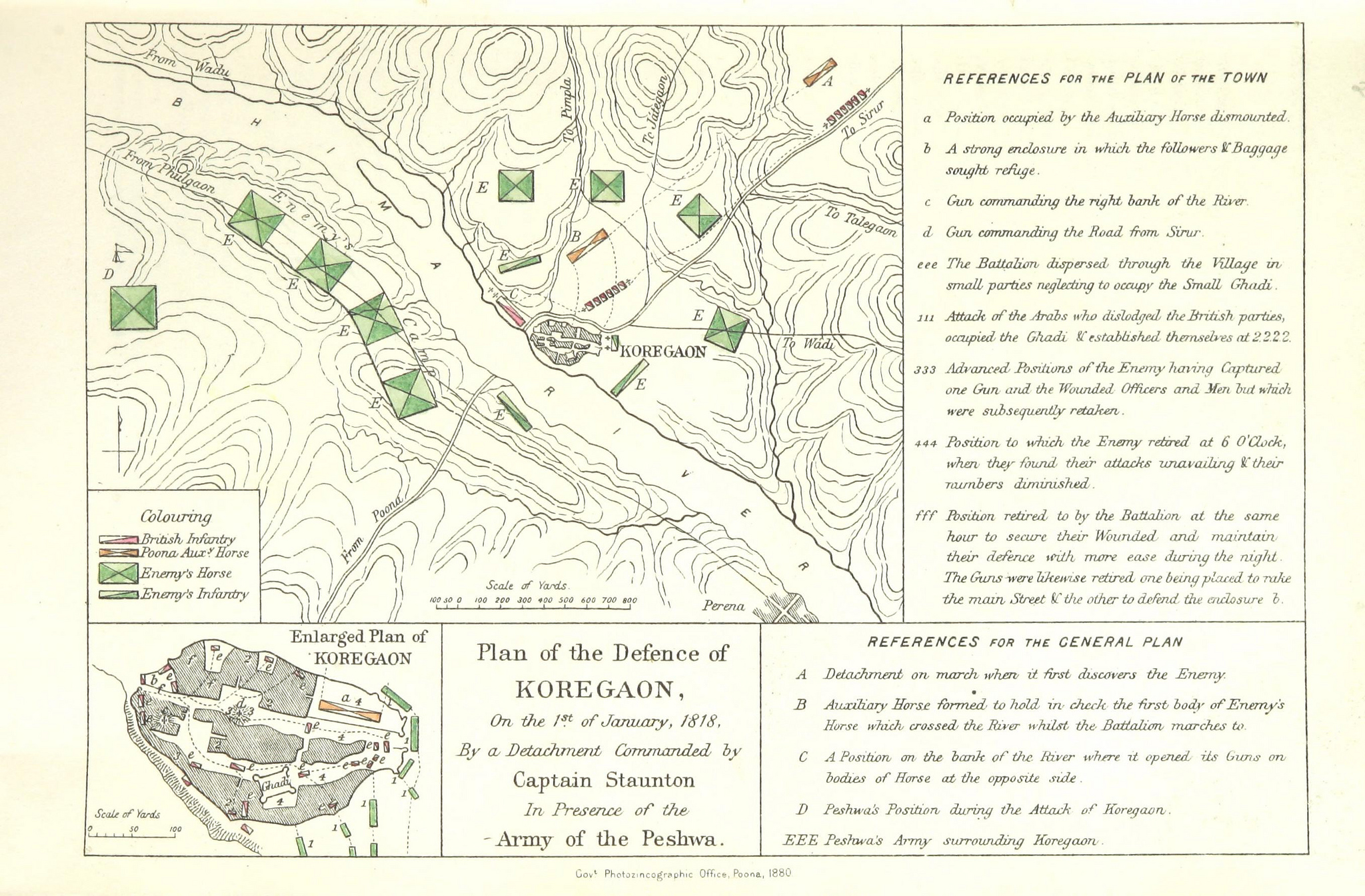
British defence plan during Battle of Koregaon

The patronage of the Maratha Peshwas resulted in a great expansion of Pune, with the construction of around 250 temples and bridges in the city, including the Lakdi Pul and the temples on Parvati Hill and many Maruti, Vithoba, Vishnu, Mahadeo, Rama, Krishna, and Ganesh temples. The building of temples led to religion being responsible for about 15% of the city's economy during this period. Pune prospered as a city during the reign of Nanasaheb Peshwa. He developed Saras Baug, Heera Baug, Parvati Hill and new commercial, trading, and residential localities. Sadashiv Peth, Narayan Peth, Rasta Peth and Nana Peth were developed. The Peshwa's influence in India declined after the defeat of Maratha forces at the Battle of Panipat but Pune remained the seat of power. In 1802 Pune was captured by Yashwantrao Holkar in the Battle of Poona, directly precipitating the Second Anglo-Maratha War of 1803–1805. The Peshwa rule ended with the defeat of Peshwa Bajirao II by the British East India Company in 1818.

Historian Govind Sakharam Sardesai lists 163 prominent families that held high ranks and played significant roles in politics, military, and finance in 18th century Pune. Of these 163 families, a majority(80) were Deshastha Brahmins, 46 were Chitpawan, 15 were Chandraseniya Kayastha Prabhu (CKP) whereas Karhade Brahmin and Saraswat accounted for 11 families each.

=== British rule (1818–1947) ===
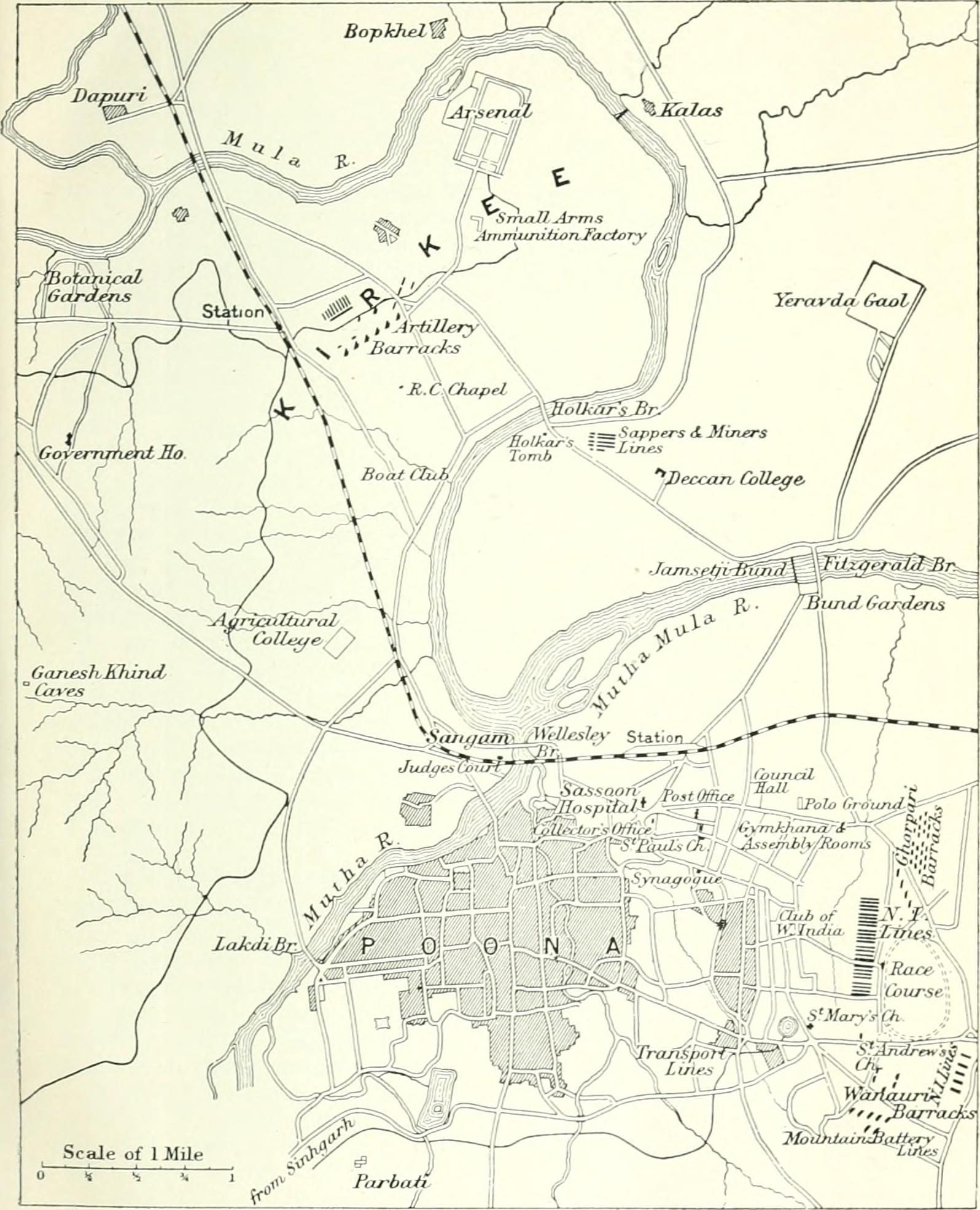
Map of Poona in 1911.

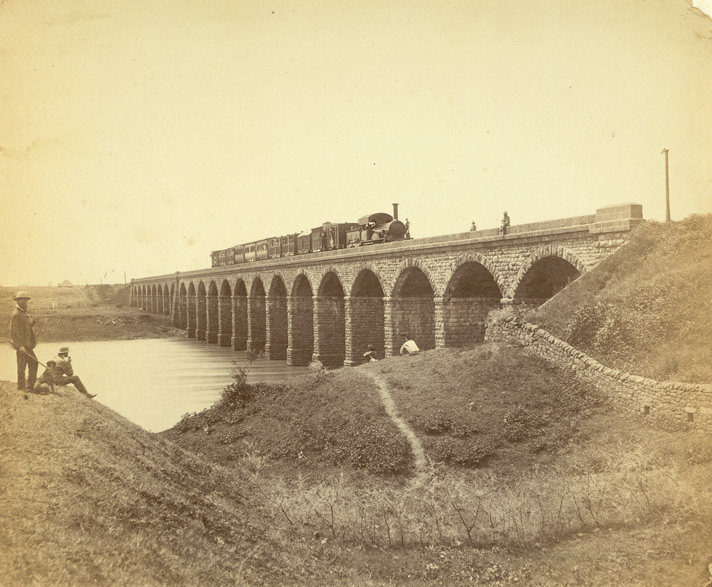
Dapoorie railway bridge in Dapodi in 1858.

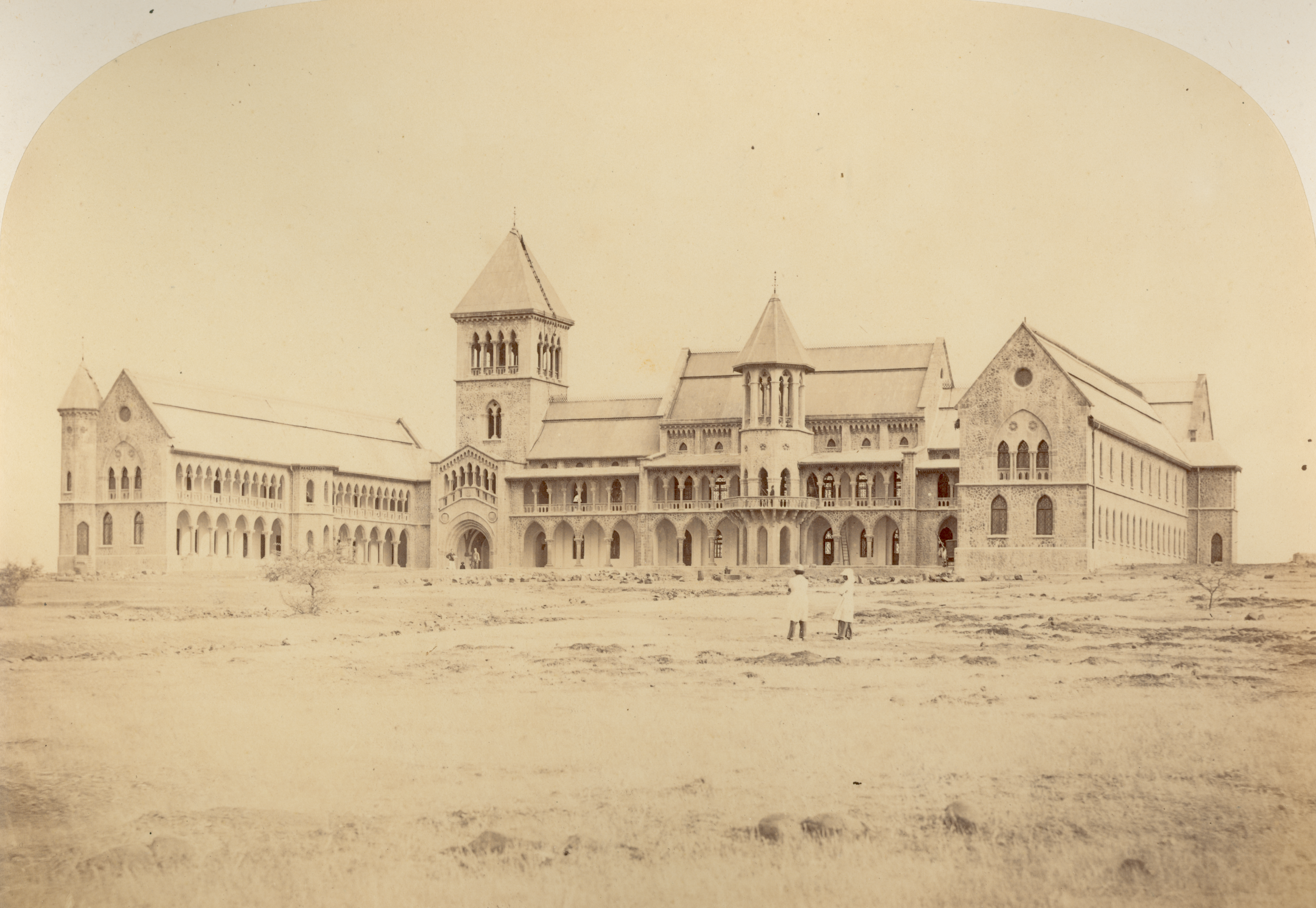
Deccan College in Poona in India Around 1875

The Third Anglo-Maratha War broke out between the Marathas and the British East India Company in 1817. The Peshwas were defeated at the Battle of Khadki (then spelled Kirkee) on 5 November near Pune and the city was seized by the British. It was placed under the administration of the Bombay Presidency and the British built a large military cantonment to the east of the city (now used by the Indian Army). The old city and the cantonment areas followed different patterns of development, with the latter being developed more on European lines to cater for the needs of the British military class. The old city had narrow lanes and areas segregated by caste and religion. The settlement of the regiments of the 17 Poona Horse cavalry, the Lancashire Fusiliers, the Maratha Light Infantry, and others, led to an increase in the population. Due to its milder weather, the city became the "Monsoon capital" of the Governor of Bombay, thus making it one of the most important cities of the Bombay Presidency. (Note: Building cantonments was a peculiarly British phenomenon in the Indian subcontinent. Whenever the British occupied new territory, they built new garrison towns near the old cities and called them cantonments.) The Southern Command of the Indian Army, established in 1895, is headquartered in Pune cantonment.

The city of Pune was known as Poona during British rule. Poona Municipality was established in 1858. A railway line from Bombay to the city opened in 1858, run by the Great Indian Peninsula Railway (GIPR). Navi Peth, Ganj Peth (now renamed Mahatma Phule Peth) were developed during the British Raj.

==== Centre of social reform and nationalism ====
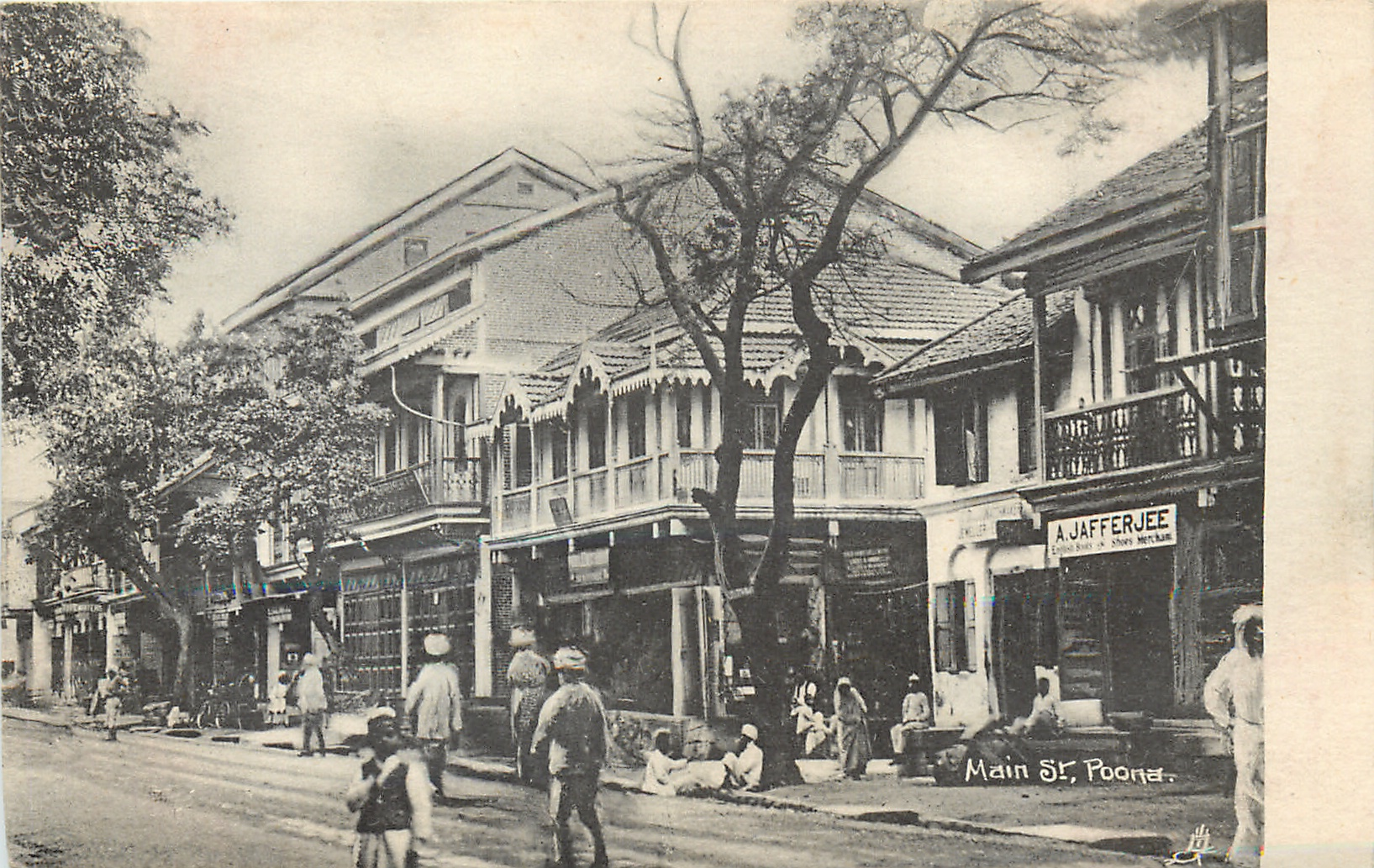
Main street,Pune (Now known as M.G. road) in early 1900s

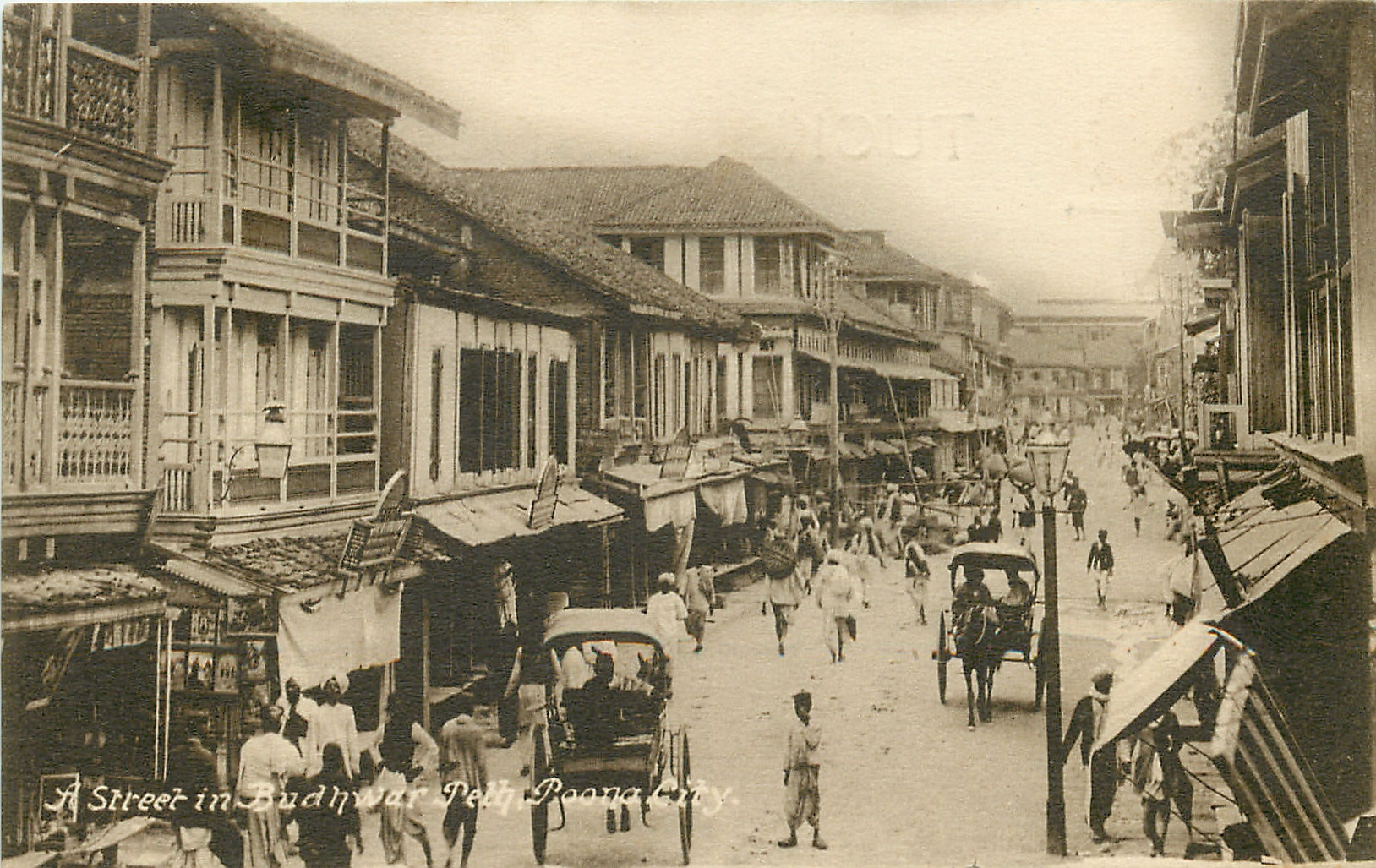
A Street in Budhwar Peth

Pune was prominently associated with the struggle for Indian independence. In the period between 1875 and 1910, the city was a centre of agitation led by Gopal Krishna Gokhale and Bal Gangadhar Tilak. The city was also a centre for social reform led by Gopal Ganesh Agarkar, Mahatma Jyotirao Phule, feminist Tarabai Shinde, Dhondo Keshav Karve and Pandita Ramabai. They demanded the abolition of caste prejudice, equal rights for women, harmony between the Hindu and Muslim communities, and better schools for the poor. Mahatma Gandhi was imprisoned at the Yerwada Central Jail several times and placed under house arrest at the Aga Khan Palace between 1942 and 1944, where both his wife Kasturba Gandhi and aide Mahadev Desai died. Savarkar used to study in Fergusson College and performed the "Holi" of foreign items near Mutha river bank.

=== Pune since Indian independence ===
After Indian independence from the British in 1947, Pune saw enormous growth, transforming it into a modern metropolis. The Poona Municipal Council was reorganised to form the Pune Municipal Corporation (PMC) in 1950. The education sector in the city continued its growth in the post-independence era with the establishment of the University of Pune (now, Savitribai Phule Pune University) in 1949, the National Chemical Laboratory in 1950 and the National Defence Academy in 1955.

The establishment of Hindustan Antibiotics in 1954 marked the beginning of industrial development in the Hadapsar, Bhosari, and Pimpri areas. MIDC provided the necessary infrastructure for new businesses to set up operations. In the 1970s, several engineering companies were set up in the city, allowing it to vie with Chennai. In the 1990s, Pune began to attract foreign capital, particularly in the information technology and engineering industries. IT parks were established in Aundh, Viman Nagar, Hinjawadi, Wagholi, Kharadi and Balewadi-Baner region. As a result, the city saw a huge influx of people due to opportunities offered by the manufacturing, and lately, the software industries.

The breach in the Panshet dam and the resulting flood of 1961 led to severe damage and the destruction of housing close to the river banks. The mishap spurred the development of new suburbs and housing complexes. To integrate urban planning, the Pune Metropolitan Region was defined in 1967 covering the area under PMC, the Pimpri-Chinchwad Municipal Corporation, the three cantonments, and the surrounding villages.

In 1998 work on the six-lane Mumbai-Pune expressway began; it was completed in 2001. In 2008, the Commonwealth Youth Games took place in Pune, which encouraged development in the northwest region of the city. On 13 February 2010, a bomb exploded at the German Bakery in the upmarket Koregaon Park neighbourhood in eastern Pune, killing 17 and injuring 60. Evidence suggested that the Indian Mujahideen terrorist group carried out the attack.

=== 21st-century ===
Pune has evolved greatly since Indian Independence, from notable universities, colleges and management schools, earning it the nickname of the 'Oxford Of The East', to being one of the most important automobile manufacturing hub. Pune is also home to the world's largest vaccine manufacturer, Serum Institute of India.

== Geography ==
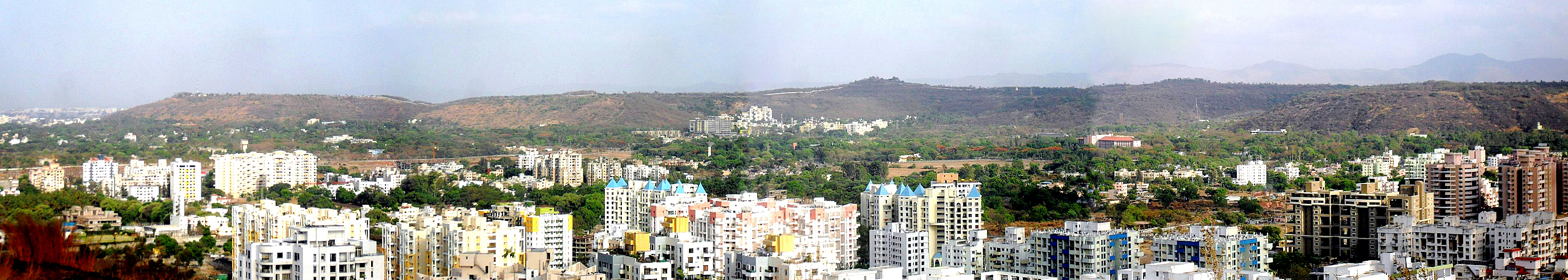
Vetal Hill Panorama, a prominent hill in Pune. Elevation c. 800 m.

Pune is situated at approximately 18° 32" north latitude and 73° 51" east longitude. The area of Pune district is 15,642 km^{2}, and the municipal corporation area covers 518 km^{2}. By road Pune is 149 km (93 mi) south-east of Mumbai, 580 km (360 mi) south-west of Indore, 695 km (432 mi) west of Nagpur, 1,173 km (729 mi) south of Delhi, 734 km (456 mi) north of Bangalore, 562 km (349 mi) north-west of Hyderabad. Pune lies on the western margin of the Deccan Plateau, at an altitude of 560 m (1,840 ft) above sea level. It is on the leeward side of the Sahyadri mountain range, which forms a barrier from the Arabian Sea. It is a hilly city, with Vetal Hill rising to 800 m (2,600 ft) above sea level. The Sinhagad fort is at an altitude of 1,300 metres (4,300 feet).

The old city of Pune is at the confluence of the Mula and Mutha rivers. The Pavana, a tributary of Mula River and Indrayani River, a tributary of the Bhima River, traverse the northwest Neighbourhoods of Pune.

=== Cityscape ===
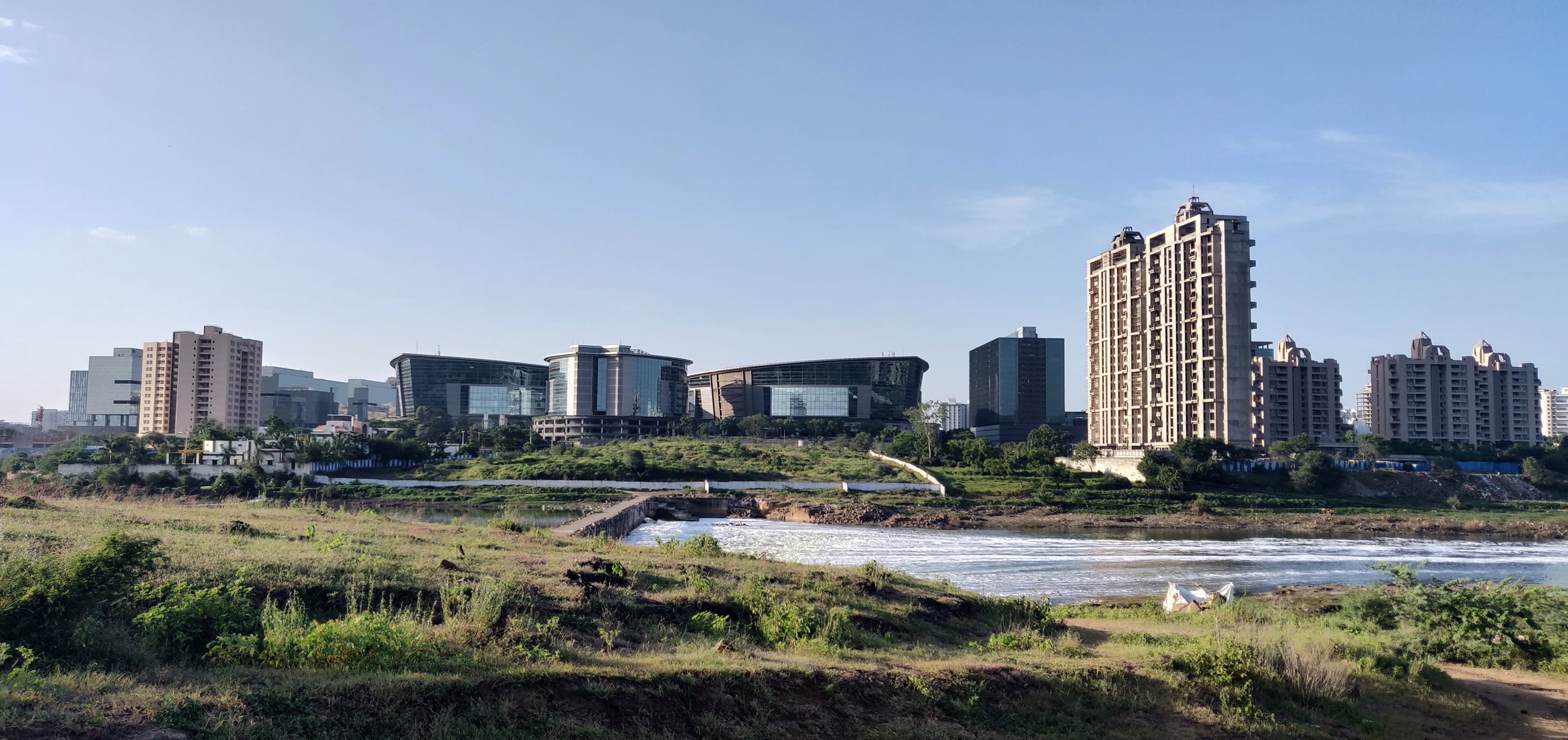
A view of the Kharadi Locality from Keshav Nagar

The modern city of Pune has many distinct neighbourhoods. These include the numerous peths of the old city on the eastern bank of the Mutha river, the cantonment areas of Khadki and Camp established by the British, and numerous suburbs. There are several Peths in usual localities of the Pune city. The industrial growth in the Pimpri, Chinchwad, Akurdi, Nigdi and nearby areas allowed these areas to incorporate a new governing municipal corporation.

The Pune Metropolitan Region (PMR), initially defined in 1967, has grown to 7,256 km^{2} made up of the ten talukas of the Pune district. The areas of PMC and PCMC along with the three cantonment areas of Camp, Khadki, and Dehu Road form the urban core of the PMR, which also includes seven municipal councils and 842 villages.

Rapid industrialisation since the 1960s has led to large influx of people into the city. Housing supply has not kept pace with demand, causing the number of slum dwellings to increase. Approximately 36% of the population lives in 486 slum areas. Of these, 45% slum households do not have in-house toilet facilities and 10% do not have electricity. One third of the slums are on mixed ownership land. The living conditions in slums varies considerably, depending on their status (formal/informal) and in how far non-governmental organisations (NGOs), community organisations (CBOs) and government agencies are involved and committed to improving local living conditions. Since the 1990s a number of landmark integrated townships and gated communities have been developed in Pune such as Magarpatta, Nanded city, Amanora, Blue Ridge, Life Republic and Lavasa. They also offer business opportunities and access to infrastructure. According to the PMC, six townships with up to 15,000 housing units existed in Pune in 2012 and 25 more were in the planning process.

The Mercer 2017 Quality of Living Rankings evaluated living conditions in more than 440 cities around the world and ranked Pune at 145, second highest in India after Hyderabad at 144. The same source highlights Pune as being among evolving business centres and as one of nine emerging cities around the world with the citation "Hosts IT and automotive companies". The 2017 Annual Survey of India's City-Systems (ASICS) report, released by the Janaagraha Centre for Citizenship and Democracy, adjudged Pune as the best governed of 23 major cities.

Selection of neighborhoods in Pune

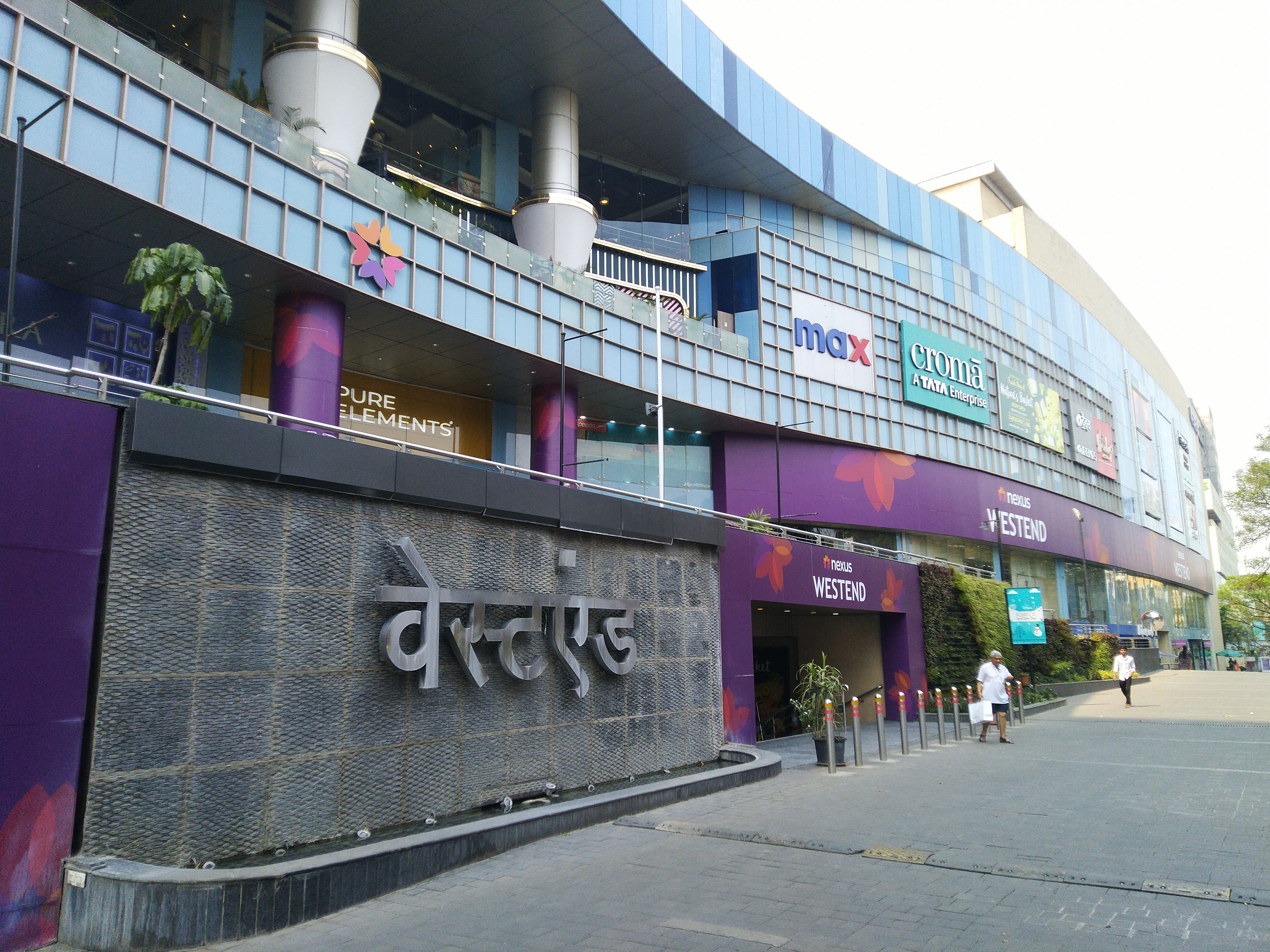
Aundh

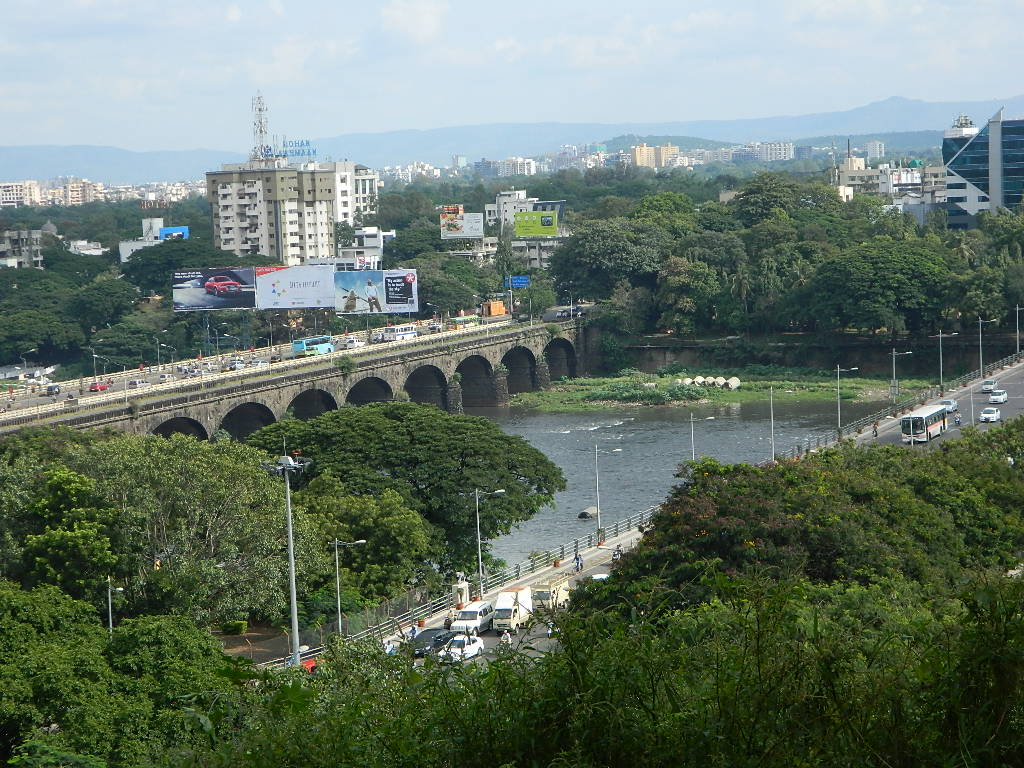
Bund Garden

Erandwane

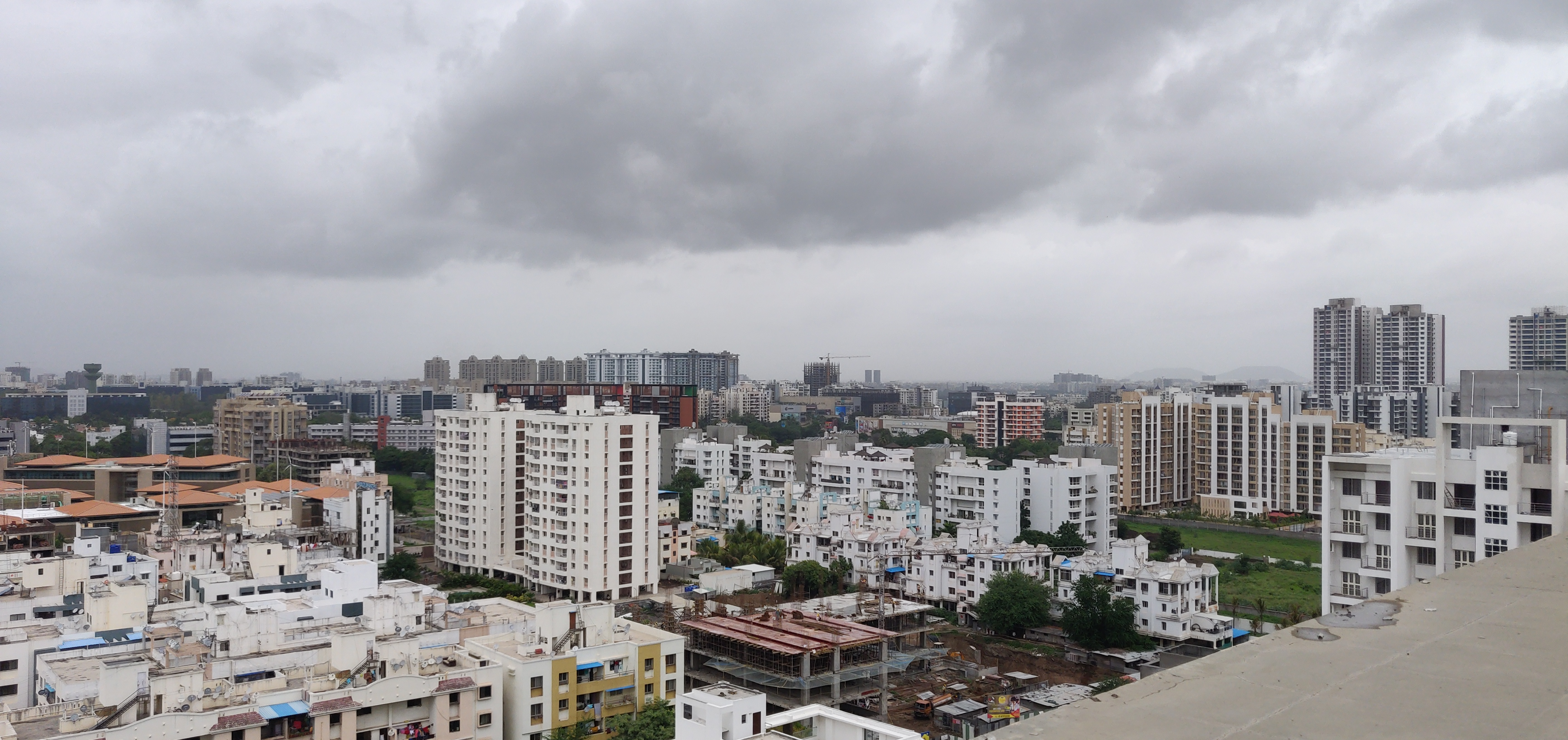
Hadapsar

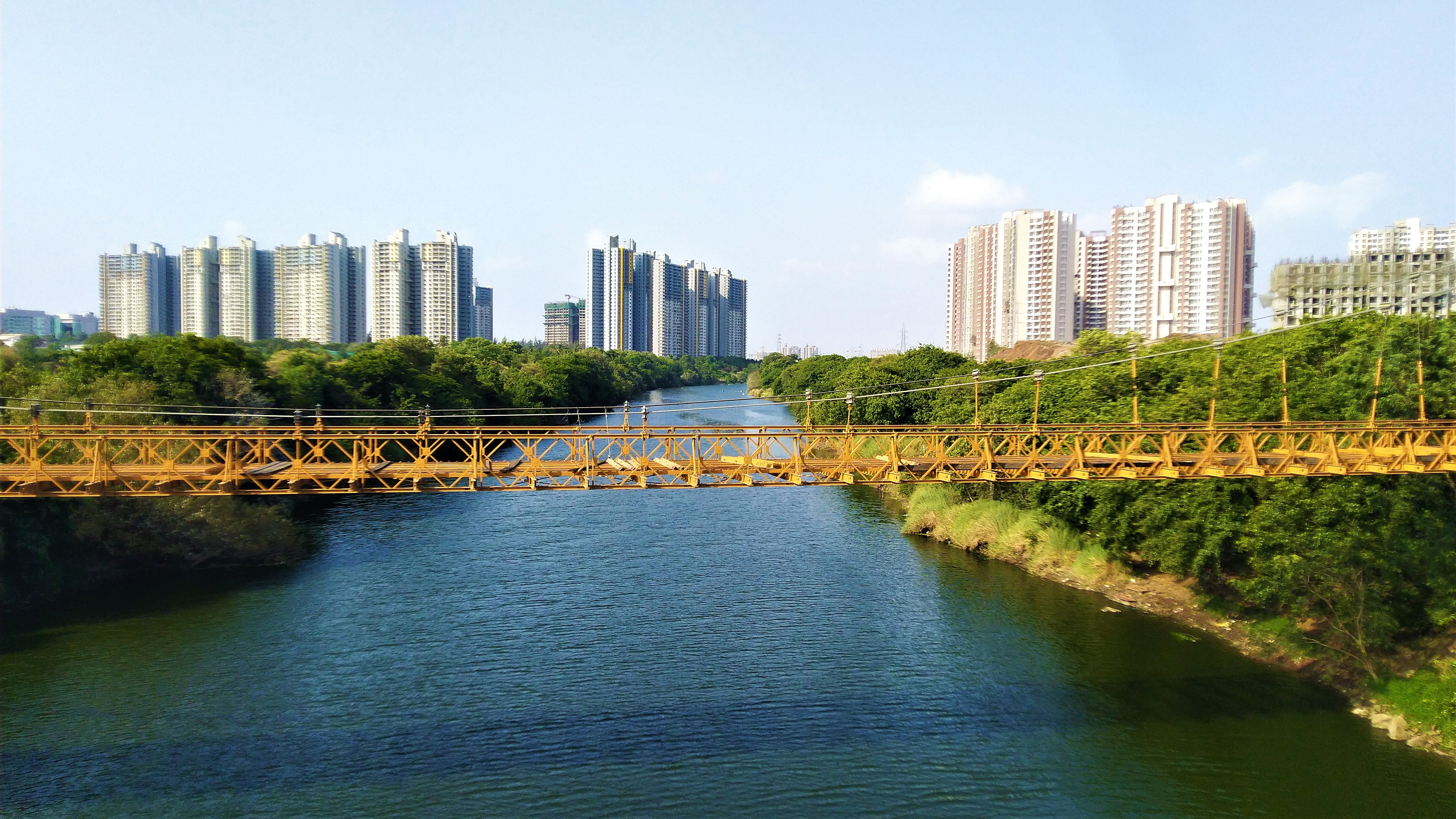
Hinjawadi

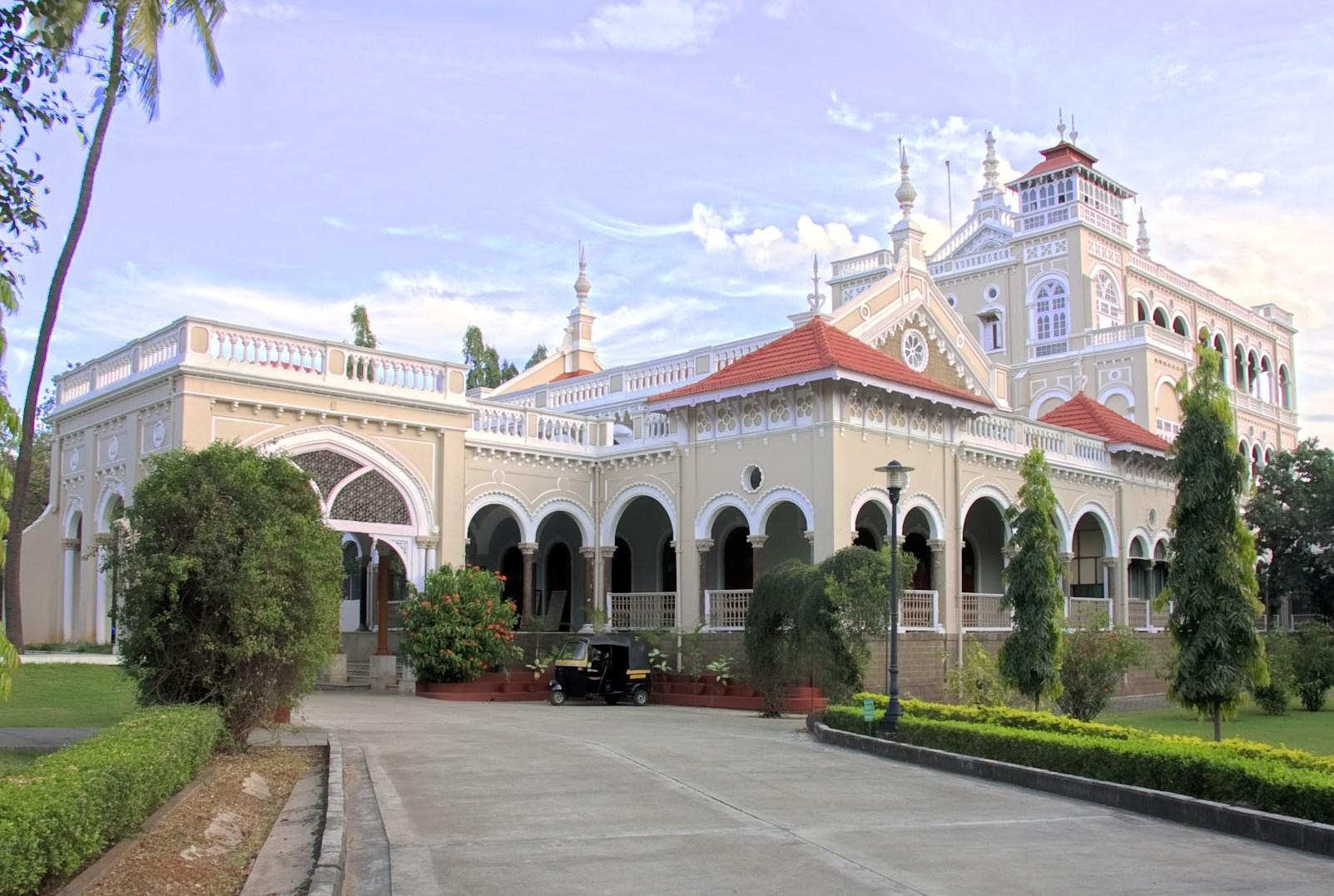
Kalyani Nagar

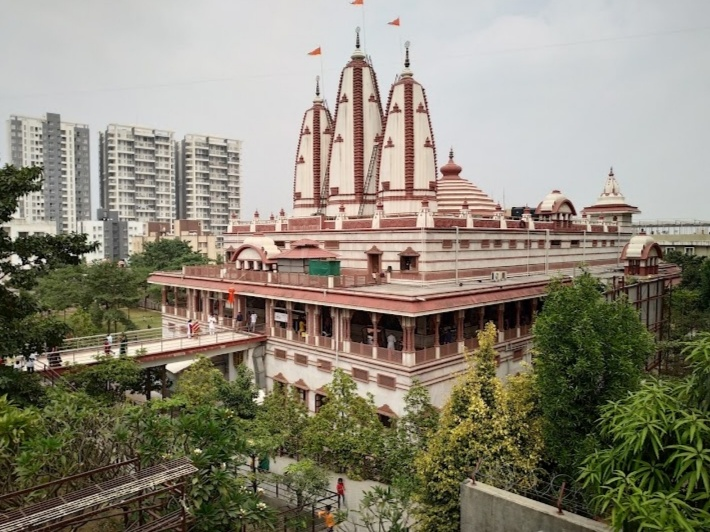
Katraj

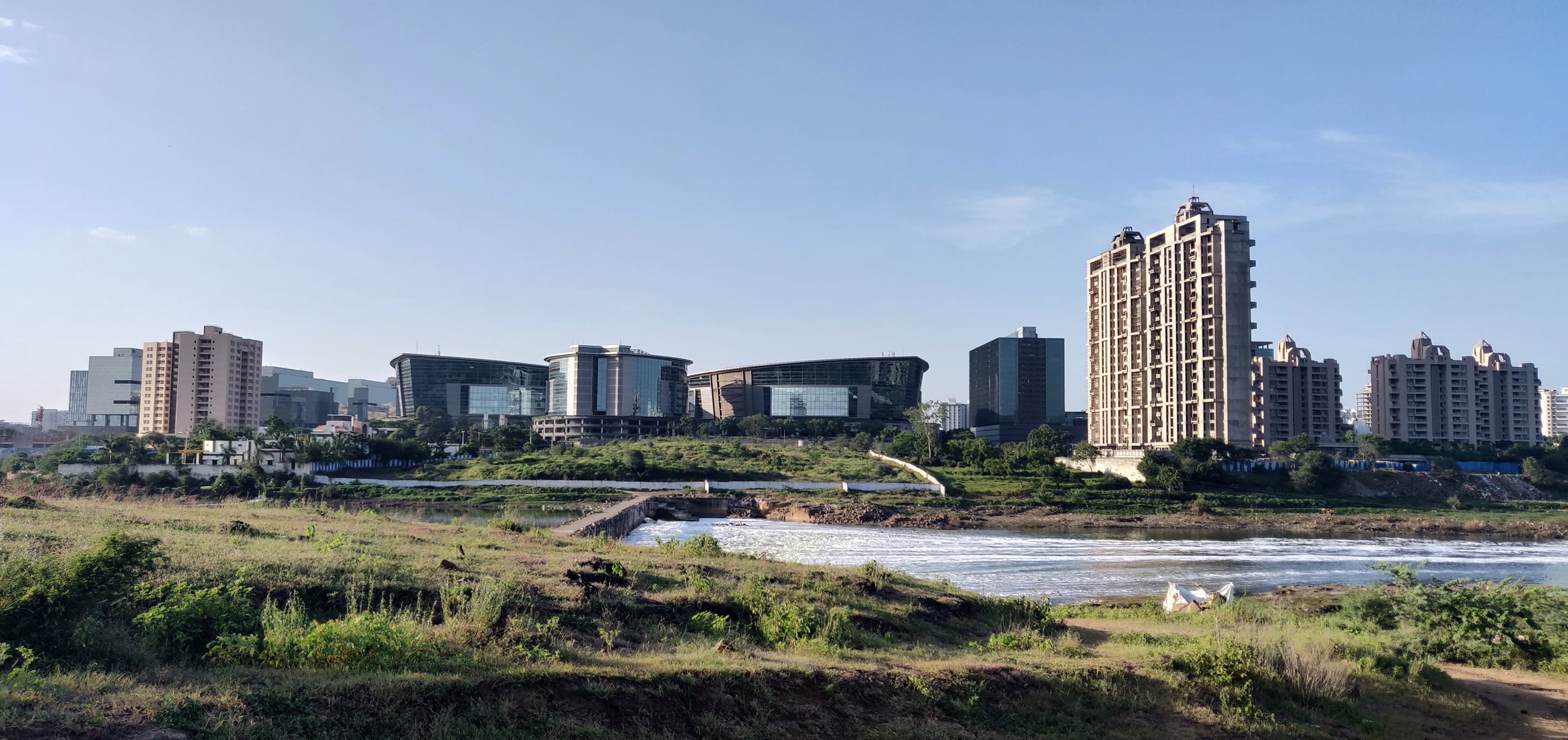
Kharadi

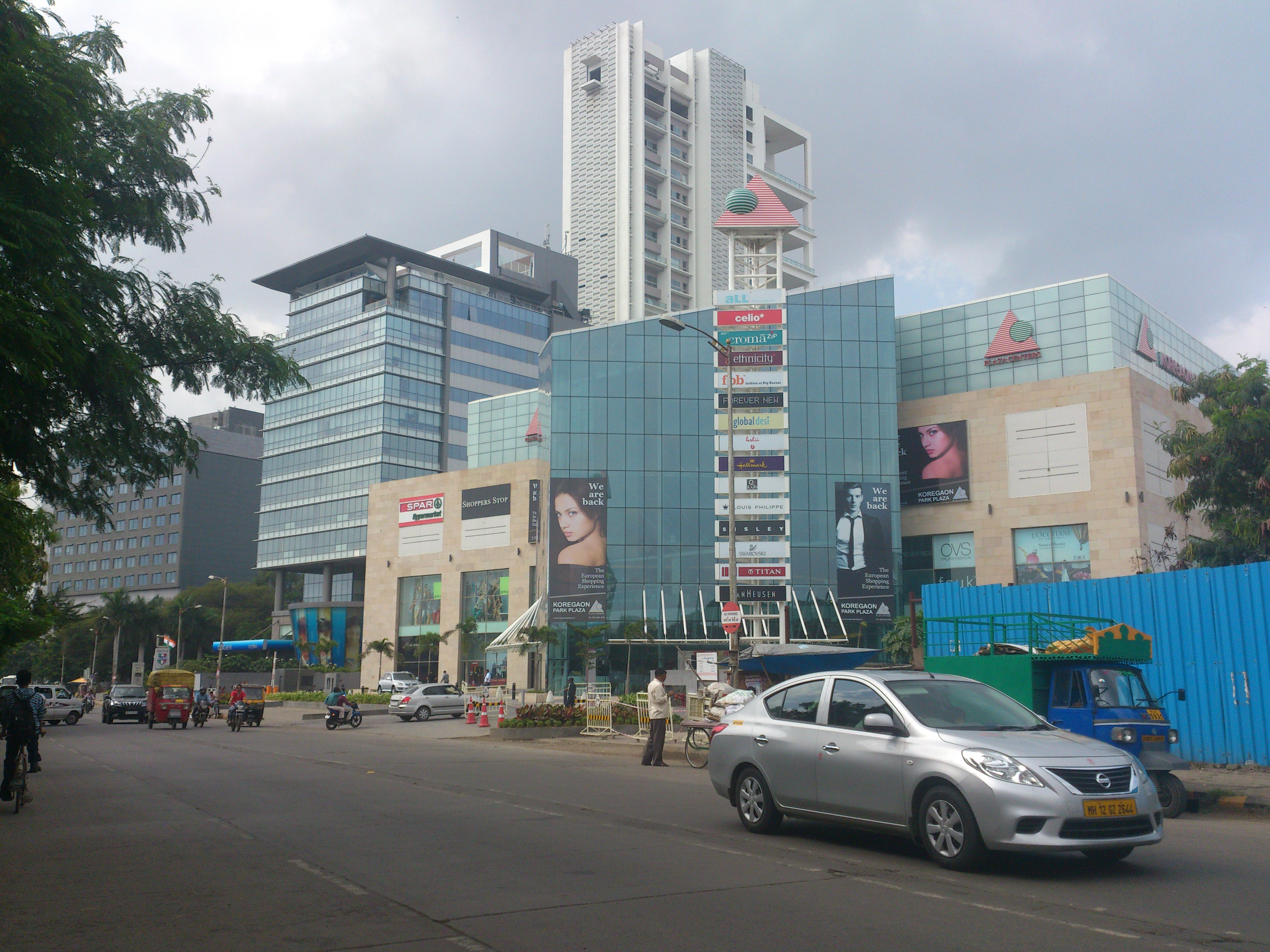
Koregaon Park

Kothrud

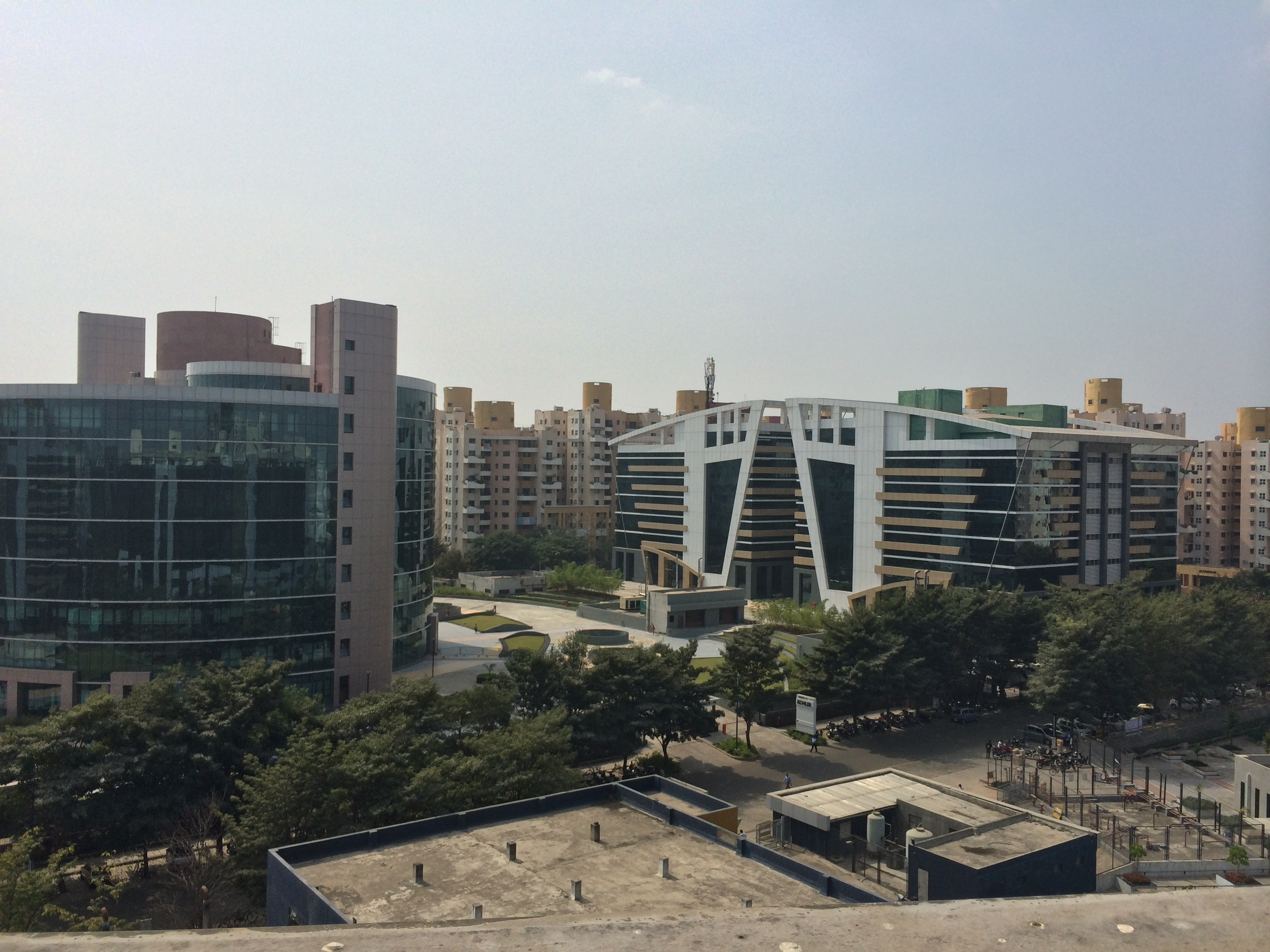
Magarpatta

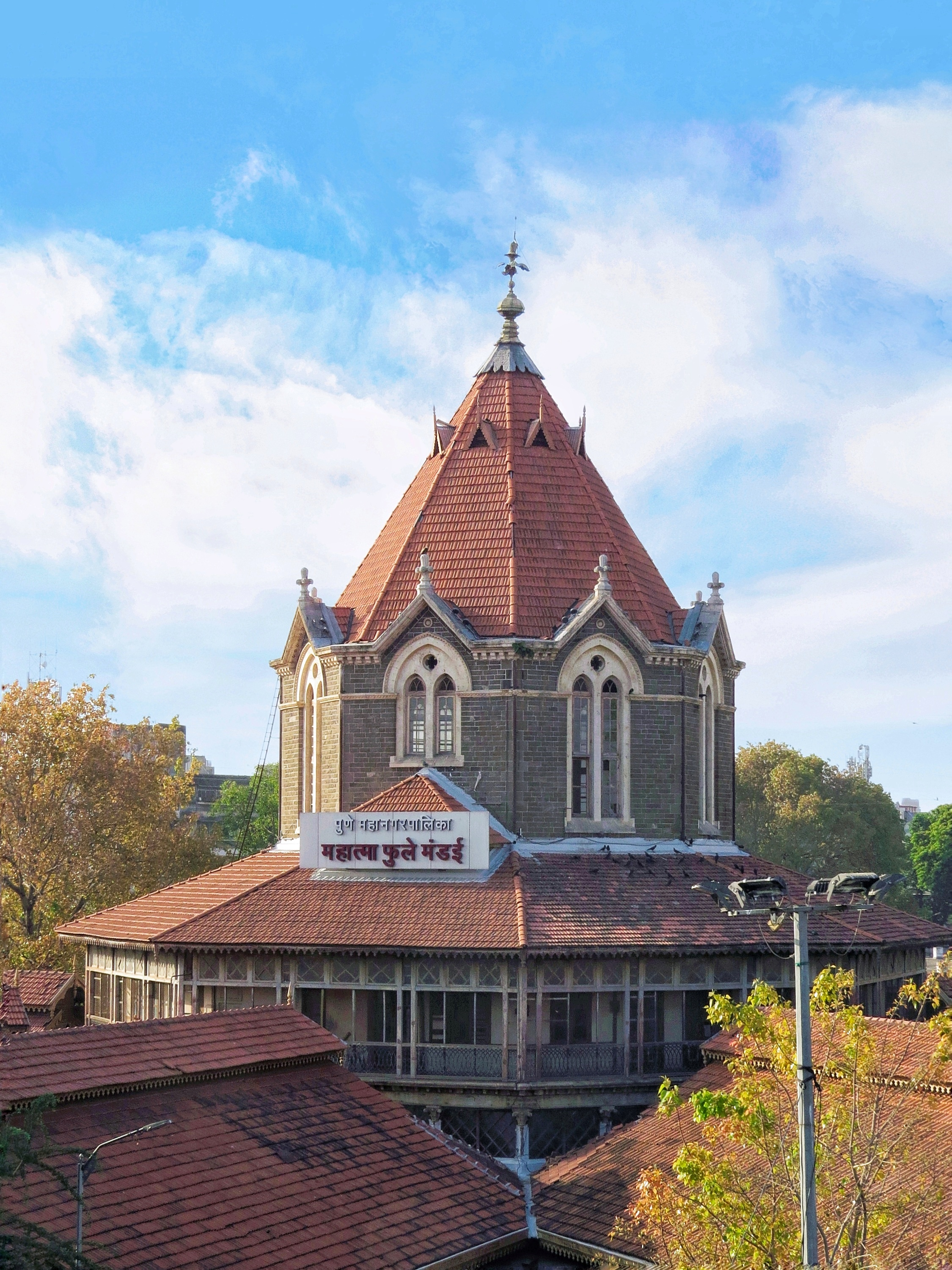
Mandai

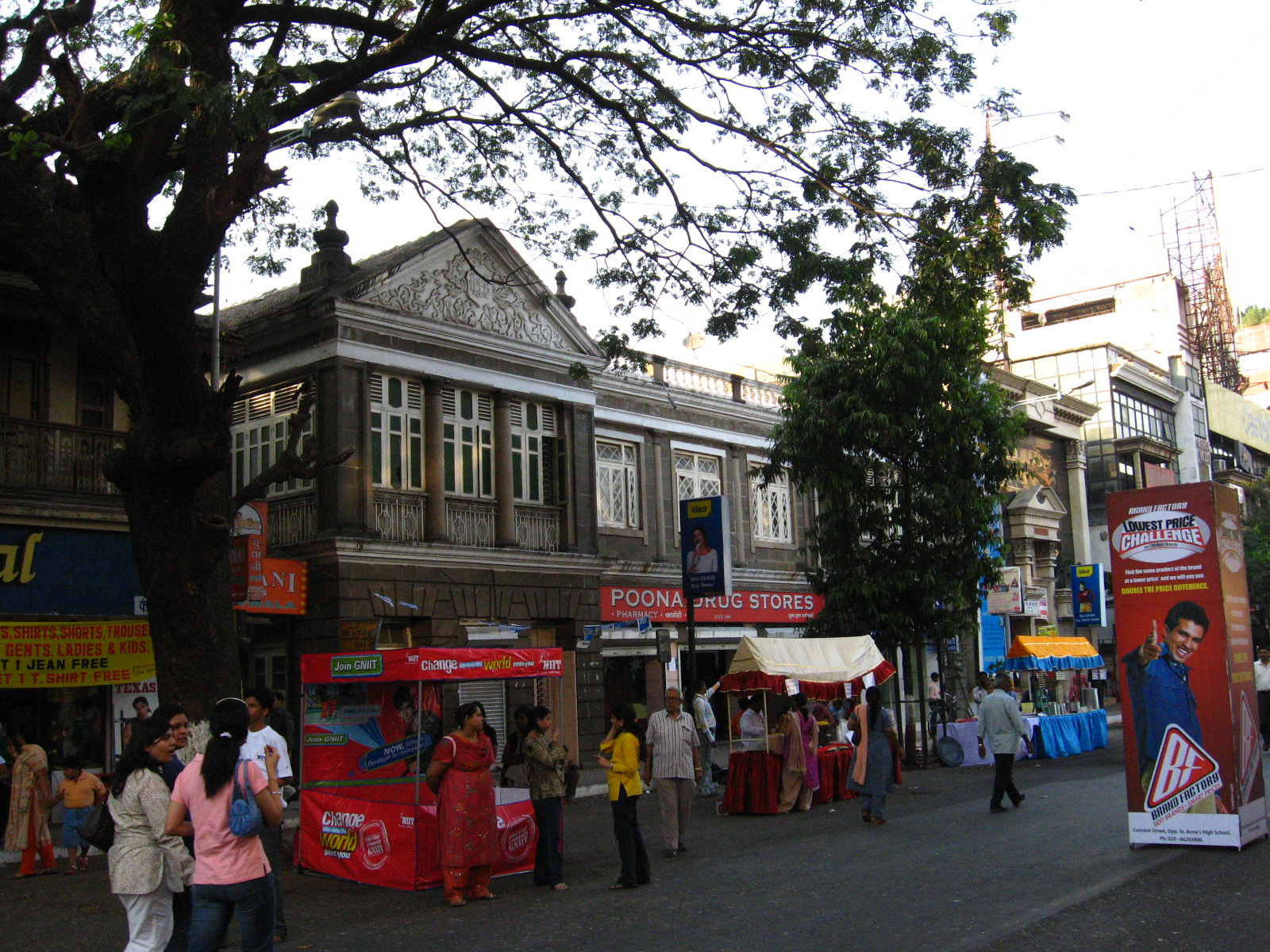
Pune Camp

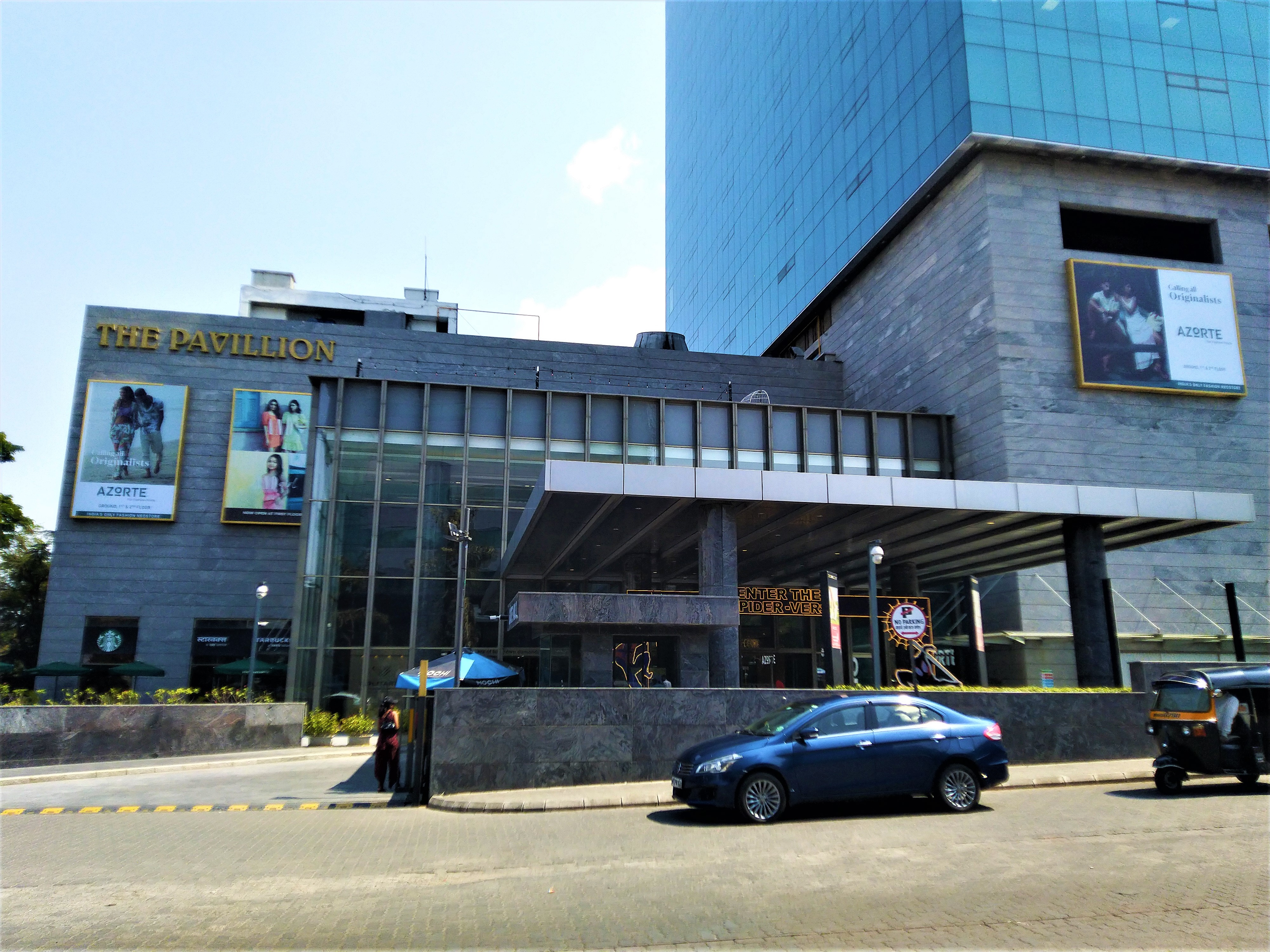
Shivajinagar

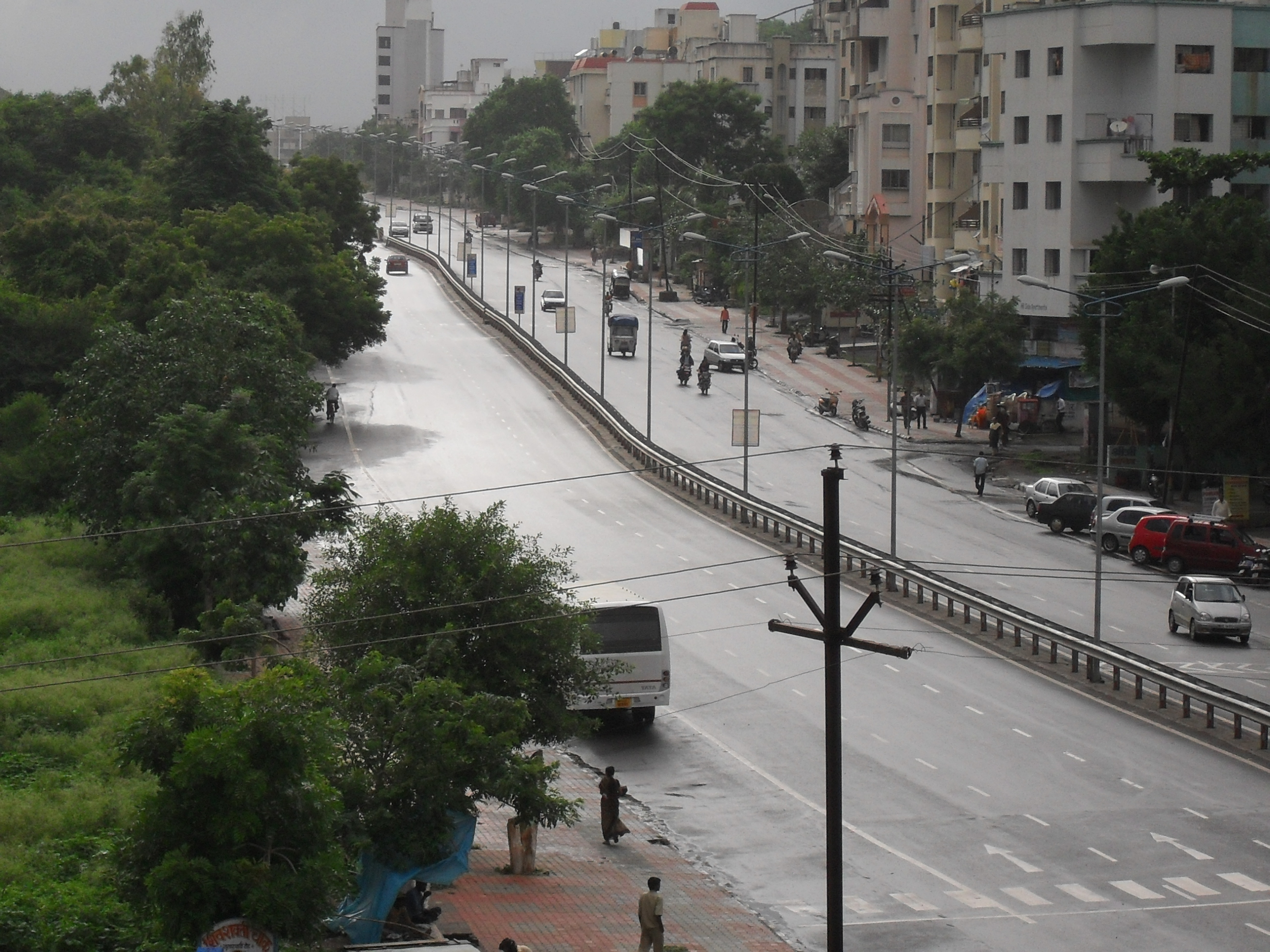
Sus

==== Peths in Pune ====
Peth is a general term in the Marathi language for a locality in Pune. Seventeen peths are located in Pune, which today constitute the old city of Pune. Most were established during the Maratha Empire era under the Maratha and Peshwa rule of the city in the 18th century, before the arrival of the British. Pune is home to many distinctive peths, or place names, for various neighbourhoods. The majority of them bore the names of their founders and days of the week.

=== Climate ===
Pune has a tropical wet and dry (Köppen Aw) climate, closely bordering upon a hot semi-arid climate (Köppen BSh) with average temperatures ranging between 20 and 28 °C (68 and 82 °F). Pune experiences three seasons: summer, monsoon, and winter. Typical summer months are from mid-March to mid-June, with maximum temperatures sometimes reaching 42 °C (108 °F). The warmest month in Pune is May. The city often has heavy dusty winds in May, with humidity remaining high. Even during the hottest months, the nights are usually cool due to Pune's high altitude. The highest temperature recorded was 43.3 °C (109.9 °F) on 30 April 1897.

The monsoon lasts from June to October, with moderate rainfall and temperatures ranging from 22 to 28 °C (72 to 82 °F). Most of the 822 mm (32.36 in) of annual rainfall in the city falls between June and September, and July is the wettest month of the year. Hailstorms are not unheard of. For most of December and January the daytime temperature hovers around 29 °C (84.2 °F) while overnight temperatures are below 12 °C (53.6 °F). On 11 May 2023, Koregaon Park recorded a temperature of 44.4 °C (112 °F)

Climate data for Pune (1991–2020, extremes 1901–present)
Month	Jan	Feb	Mar	Apr	May	Jun	Jul	Aug	Sep	Oct	Nov	Dec	Year
Record high °C (°F)	35.9 (96.6)	38.9 (102.0)	42.8 (109.0)	43.3 (109.9)	44.4 (111.9)	41.7 (107.1)	36.0 (96.8)	35.0 (95.0)	36.1 (97.0)	37.8 (100.0)	36.1 (97.0)	35.0 (95.0)	44.4 (111.9)
Mean daily maximum °C (°F)	29.8 (85.6)	32.2 (90.0)	35.6 (96.1)	37.9 (100.2)	37.3 (99.1)	32.0 (89.6)	28.3 (82.9)	27.8 (82.0)	29.5 (85.1)	31.5 (88.7)	30.7 (87.3)	29.5 (85.1)	31.9 (89.4)
Daily mean °C (°F)	20.5 (68.9)	22.5 (72.5)	25.8 (78.4)	29.0 (84.2)	30.1 (86.2)	27.6 (81.7)	25.4 (77.7)	24.7 (76.5)	25.2 (77.4)	25.3 (77.5)	22.9 (73.2)	20.6 (69.1)	25.0 (76.9)
Mean daily minimum °C (°F)	11.2 (52.2)	12.7 (54.9)	16.0 (60.8)	19.9 (67.8)	22.9 (73.2)	23.1 (73.6)	22.4 (72.3)	21.7 (71.1)	21.0 (69.8)	19.0 (66.2)	15.1 (59.2)	11.8 (53.2)	18.1 (64.6)
Record low °C (°F)	1.7 (35.1)	3.9 (39.0)	7.2 (45.0)	10.6 (51.1)	13.8 (56.8)	17.0 (62.6)	18.9 (66.0)	17.2 (63.0)	13.2 (55.8)	9.4 (48.9)	4.6 (40.3)	3.3 (37.9)	1.7 (35.1)
Average rainfall mm (inches)	0.7 (0.03)	0.1 (0.00)	3.1 (0.12)	6.8 (0.27)	19.8 (0.78)	183.9 (7.24)	190.0 (7.48)	156.3 (6.15)	140.4 (5.53)	105.3 (4.15)	28.1 (1.11)	6.8 (0.27)	841.2 (33.12)
Average rainy days	0.1	0.0	0.4	0.6	1.4	9.3	13.1	10.8	8.3	5.5	1.5	0.3	51.3
Average relative humidity (%) (at 17:30 IST)	36	27	22	24	36	66	77	79	73	57	47	41	49
Average dew point °C (°F)	12 (54)	11 (52)	11 (52)	13 (55)	18 (64)	21 (70)	21 (70)	21 (70)	21 (70)	19 (66)	16 (61)	13 (55)	16 (61)
Mean monthly sunshine hours	294.5	282.5	300.7	303.0	313.1	183.0	114.7	111.6	177.0	244.9	264.0	279.0	2,868
Mean daily sunshine hours	9.5	10.0	9.7	10.1	10.1	6.1	3.7	3.6	5.9	7.9	8.8	9.0	7.9
Source 1: India Meteorological Department (sun 1971–2000)
Source 2: Tokyo Climate Center (mean temperatures 1991–2020)

Pune has been ranked 23rd best "National Clean Air City" (under Category 1 >10L Population cities) in India according to 'Swachh Vayu Survekshan 2024 Results'

=== Seismology ===
Pune is 100 km (62 mi) north of the seismically active zone around Koyna Dam. The India Meteorological Department has assessed this area as being in Zone 3, on a scale of 2 to 5, with 5 being the most prone to earthquakes. Pune has experienced some moderate – and many low – intensity earthquakes in its history.

== Demographics ==
Historical population
Year	Pop.	±%
1851	73,000	—
1891	118,790	+62.7%
1901	153,320	+29.1%
1911	158,856	+3.6%
1921	198,523	+25.0%
1931	198,078	−0.2%
1941	257,554	+30.0%
1951	488,419	+89.6%
1971	856,105	+75.3%
1981	1,203,351	+40.6%
1991	1,566,651	+30.2%
2001	2,540,069	+62.1%
2011	3,124,458	+23.0%
Source: Census of India

The city has a population of 3,124,458; while 5,057,709 people reside in the Pune Urban Agglomeration as of the 2011 census. The latter was c. 4,485,000 in 2005. According to the Pune Municipal Corporation (PMC), 40% of the population lived in slums in 2001.

Since Pune is a major industrial metropolis, it has attracted migrants from all parts of India. The number of people migrating to Pune rose from 43,900 in 2001 to 88,200 in 2005. The sharp increase in population during the decade 1991–2001 led to the absorption of 38 fringe villages into the city. The top five source areas of migrants are Karnataka, Uttar Pradesh, Andhra Pradesh, Gujarat, and Rajasthan. The Sindhis in the city are mostly refugees and their descendants, who came to the area after the partition of India in 1947. Initially they settled in the Pimpri area, which is still home to a large number of Sindhi people. However, they are also present in other parts of the city. As agriculture has dwindled in recent decades, immigration of the erstwhile rural peoples now accounts for 70 per cent of the population growth.

The average literacy rate of Pune was 86.15% in 2011 compared to 80.45% in 2001.

=== Religion ===
Religion in Pune (2011)
Religion	Percent
Hinduism	79.43%
Islam	11.03%
Buddhism	3.94%
Jainism	2.45%
Christianity	2.17%
Sikhism	0.43%
Other or not stated	0.55%
Others include Parsis.

Hinduism is the major religion, practised by a little under 80% of people in Pune. Other religions with a significant presence include Islam, Buddhism, Jainism, Christianity, Sikhism and Zoroastrianism.

Of the many Hindu temples in the city, the Parvati temple complex on Parvati Hill and at least 250 others date back to the 18th century. These temples were commissioned by the Peshwas, who ruled the city at the time, and are dedicated to various deities including Maruti, Vithoba, Vishnu, Mahadeo, Rama, Krishna and Ganesh. The historic temples of Kasba Ganapati, the Tambadi (Red) Jogeshwari are considered the guardian deities of the city. Dagadusheth Halwai Ganapati Temple is the richest Ganesh temple in Pune. Pune district has two of the most important pilgrimage centres of the Varkari sect of the Bhakti movement in Maharashtra, namely Alandi where the samadhi of 13th century Saint Dnyaneshwar is located and Dehu where the 17th century Saint Tukaram lived. Every year in the Hindu month of Ashadh (June/July), the Paduka (symbolic sandals) of these saints are carried in a pilgrimage, the Pandharpur Vari, to meet Vithoba. The procession makes a stopover in the city on its way to Pandharpur attracting hundreds of thousands of Varkaris and devotees. Other important Hindu pilgrimage sites in PMR or the district include Jejuri, and five of Ashtavinayak Ganesh temples. The Shrutisagar Ashram houses the Vedanta Research Centre and a unique temple of Dakshinamurthy.

Prominent mosques include Roshan Masjid, Chand Tara Masjid, Jama Masjid, and Azam Campus Masjid, Manusha Masjid. Chand Tara Masjid, located in Nana Peth, is one of the biggest and most important mosques in Pune as it is the city headquarters (markaz) for the Tablighi Jamaat. Pune is also the birthplace of Meher Baba, although his followers usually travel to Meherabad to visit his tomb. Hazrat Babajan, identified by Meher Baba as one of the five perfect masters, has a shrine (Dargah) erected in her honour under a neem tree in Pune Camp.

Pune has a distinct Christian community comprising Roman Catholic, Pentecostals, CNI, Methodist, Presbyterians, Christian Missionaries helped in setting up schools and colleges all over and also spread the message of faith. The city has several churches dedicated to different Christian denominations such as St. Anthony's Shrine and Vineyard Worker's of Christ Church, Dapodi. St. Patrick's Cathedral built in 1850 is the seat of the bishop of the Roman Catholic Diocese of Poona.

Pune has Jain temples dating back to the Peshwa era. At present, there are more than one hundred Jain temples in PMR with the one at Katraj being the largest. Pune has over 20 Gurdwaras, with Gurdwara Guru Nanak Darbar in Pune Camp and Gurdwara Shri Guru Singh Sabha in Ganesh Peth being the ones situated in the heart of the city. The 19th-century Ohel David Synagogue, known locally as Lal Deval, is said to be one of the largest synagogues in Asia outside Israel. The Sir Jamsetjee Jejeebhoy Agiary is a prominent Zoroastrian temple.

Pune has been associated with several significant recent spiritual teachers. The controversial Guru Rajneesh, also known as Osho, lived and taught in Pune for much of the 1970s and 1980s. The Osho International Meditation Resort, one of the world's largest spiritual centres, is located in Koregaon Park and attracts visitors from over a hundred countries. The meditation resort organises music and meditation festival every year during monsoon, known as Osho Monsoon Festival. A number of well known artists around the world participates in the event.

=== Languages ===
Languages of Pune M Corp (2011)
1. Marathi (67.9%)
2. Hindi (13.1%)
3. Urdu (3.78%)
4. Marwari (2.60%)
5. Gujarati (2.25%)
6. Telugu (1.99%)
7. Kannada (1.92%)
8. Others (6.43%)

Marathi is the official and most-spoken language. Pune, being the cultural capital of Maharashtra, is a centre for Marathi literature and its dialect forms the basis for the written standard of Marathi. As a destination for migrants throughout India, Hindi is also widely-spoken, as is Dakhni Urdu by the Muslim community. Gujarati and Marwari are spoken by the business community.

== Government and politics ==
=== Civic administration ===
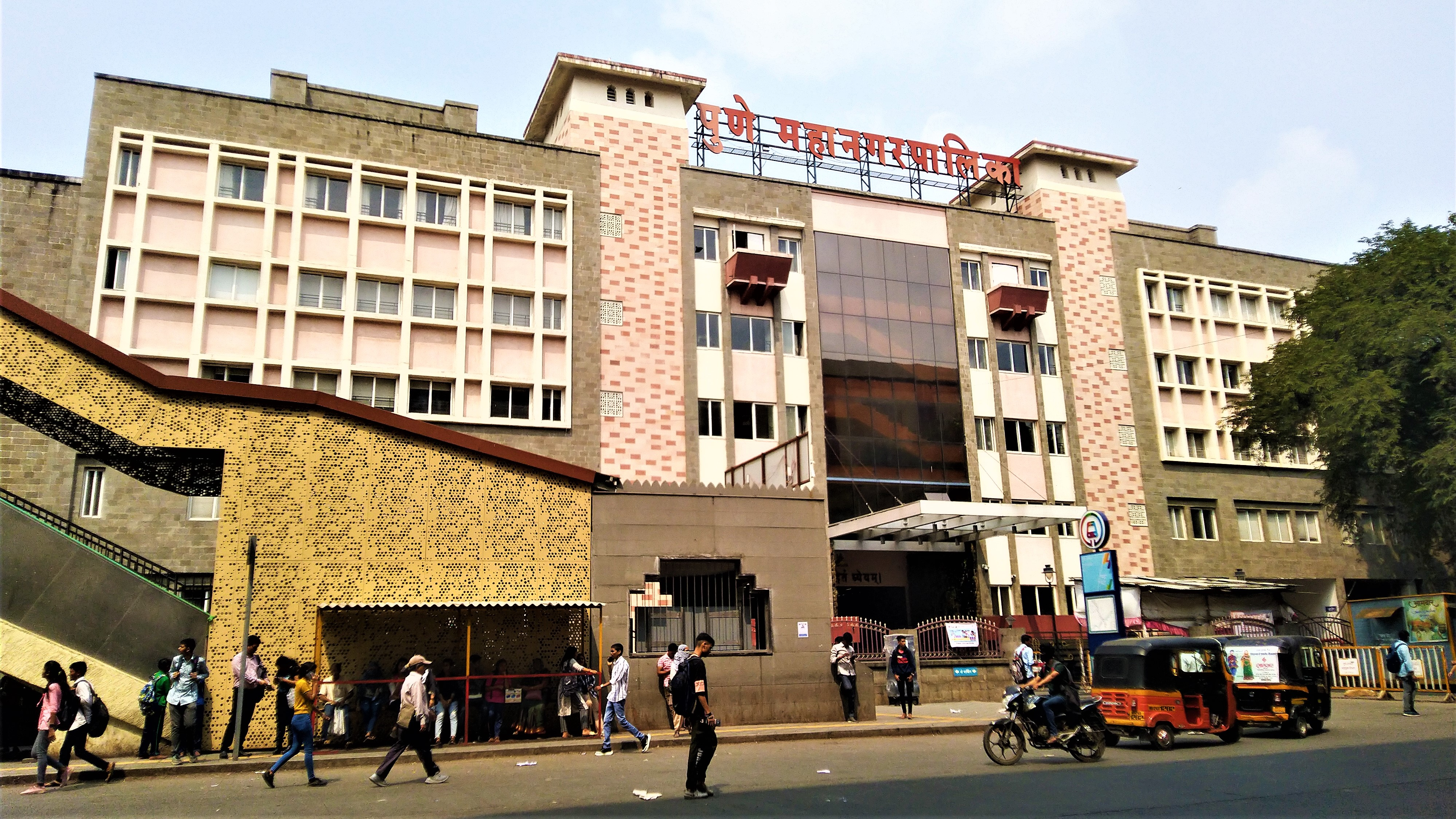
Pune Municipal Corporation building

Pune Municipal Corporation and Pimpri-Chinchwad Municipal Corporation are the civic bodies responsible for local government. It comprises two branches, the executive branch headed by the Municipal Commissioner, an IAS officer appointed by the Government of Maharashtra, and an elected deliberative branch, the general body, headed by the Mayor of Pune. Municipal elections are held every five years to elect councillors, commonly known as "corporators", who form the general body. The current general body of the PMC elected in February 2017 has 162 corporators representing 41 multi-member wards (39 with 4 corporators each and 2 with 3 each). The general body, in turn, elects the mayor and the deputy mayor. The mayor has a ceremonial role as the first citizen and ambassador of the city while the actual executive power lies with the municipal commissioner. For policy deliberations, corporators form several committees. Perhaps the most important of these is the 16-member Standing Committee, half of whose members retire every year. The Standing Committee and the 15 ward committees are in charge of financial approvals. PMC was ranked 8th out of 21 Indian cities for best governance and administrative practices in 2014. It scored 3.5 out of 10 compared to the national average of 3.3.

The Pune City Police Department is the law enforcement agency for the city of Pune. It is a division of the Maharashtra Police and is headed by the Police Commissioner, an officer of the Indian Police Service. The Pune Police Department reports to the State Ministry of Home Affairs. A separate police commissionerate was announced for PCMC, Pune in April 2018 to be carved out of the historic Pune Police Department. The new commissionerate took charge on 15 August 2018.

Pune Metropolitan Region Development Authority (PMRDA) was formed on 31 March 2015 and is responsible for the integrated development of the PMR. Currently its jurisdiction extends over 7,256.46 km^{2} (2,802 sq mi) and includes two municipal corporations, three cantonment boards, seven municipal councils, 13 census towns and 842 villages.

=== Municipal finance ===
According to audited financial statements published on the CityFinance Portal of the Ministry of Housing and Urban Affairs, the Pune Municipal Corporation reported total revenue receipts of ₹94.26 billion (US$1,136 million) and total expenditure of ₹78.36 billion (US$944 million) for the financial year 2022–23. The CityFinance Portal publishes audited financial statements of urban local bodies across India.

=== Utility services ===
The PMC supplies the city with potable water that is sourced from the Khadakwasla Reservoir. There are five other reservoirs in the area that supply water to the city and the greater metropolitan area. The city lacks the capacity to treat all the sewage it generates, which leads to the Mutha river containing only sewage outside the monsoon months. In 2009 only 65% of sewage generated was treated before being discharged into the rivers. According to Anwesha Borthakur and Pardeep Singh, unplanned and haphazard development has turned the Mula-Mutha river into a dead river. The Pune municipal corporation has undertaken plans to restore life into the rivers. PMC is also responsible for collecting solid waste. Around 1,600 tons of solid waste is generated in Pune each day. The waste consists of 53% organic, compostable material; and 47% inorganic material, of which around half is recyclable. The unrecovered solid waste is transported to the dumping grounds in Urali devachi.

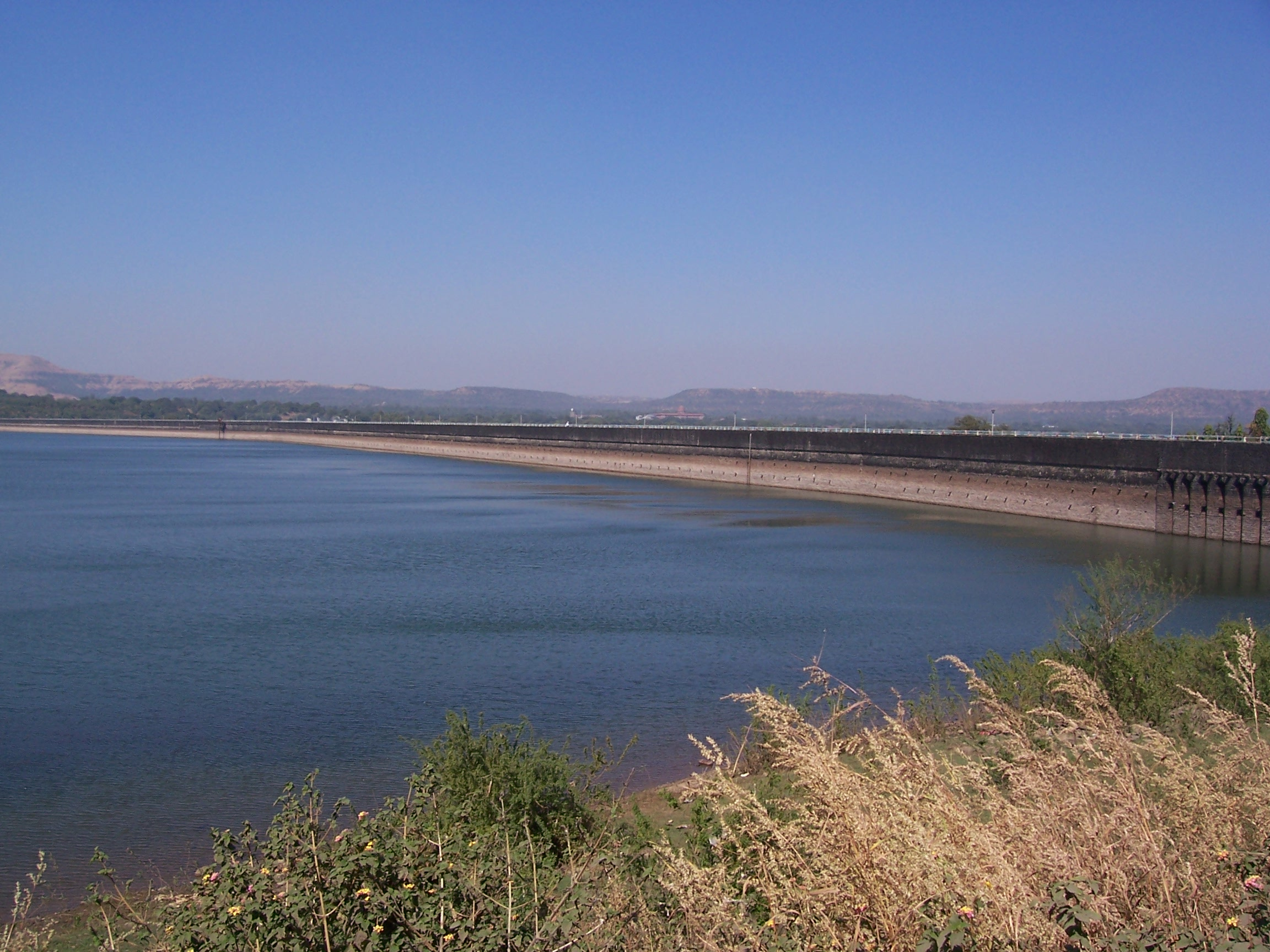
Khadakwasla reservoir, the main source of water for the city

The state owned Maharashtra State Electricity Distribution Company Limited supplies electricity to the city. Bharat Sanchar Nigam Limited (BSNL), owned by the central government, as well as private enterprises such as Reliance Jio, Bharti Airtel and Vodafone Idea are the leading telephone and cell phone service providers in the city.

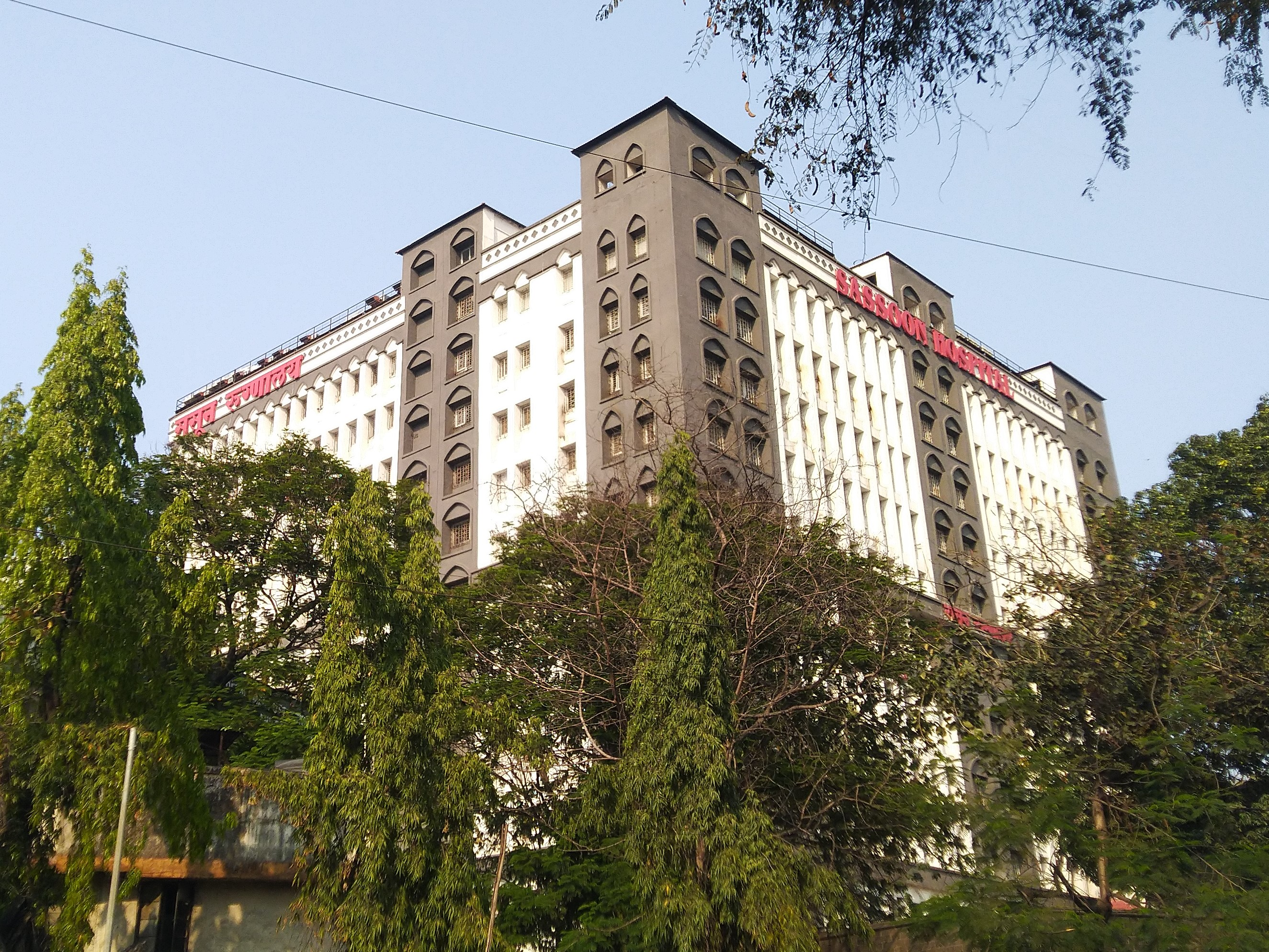
One of the oldest hospitals in India, Sassoon Hospital

=== Healthcare ===
Healthcare in the PMR is provided by private and public facilities. Primary care is provided by practitioners of Allopathic medicine as well as traditional and alternative medicine (i.e. Ayurved, Homeopathy and Unani). For minor and chronic ailments, people in the region often rely on practitioners of traditional medicine. The PMR is served by three government hospitals: Sassoon Hospital, Budhrani and Dr Ambedkar Hospital. There are also a number of private hospitals such as Ranka Hospital, Sahyadri, Jehangir Hospital, Deenanath Mangeshkar Hospital, Sancheti Hospital, Aditya Birla Memorial Hospital, KEM Hospital, Ruby Hall, Naidu Hospital and Smile Inn Dental Clinic Pune.

== Economy ==
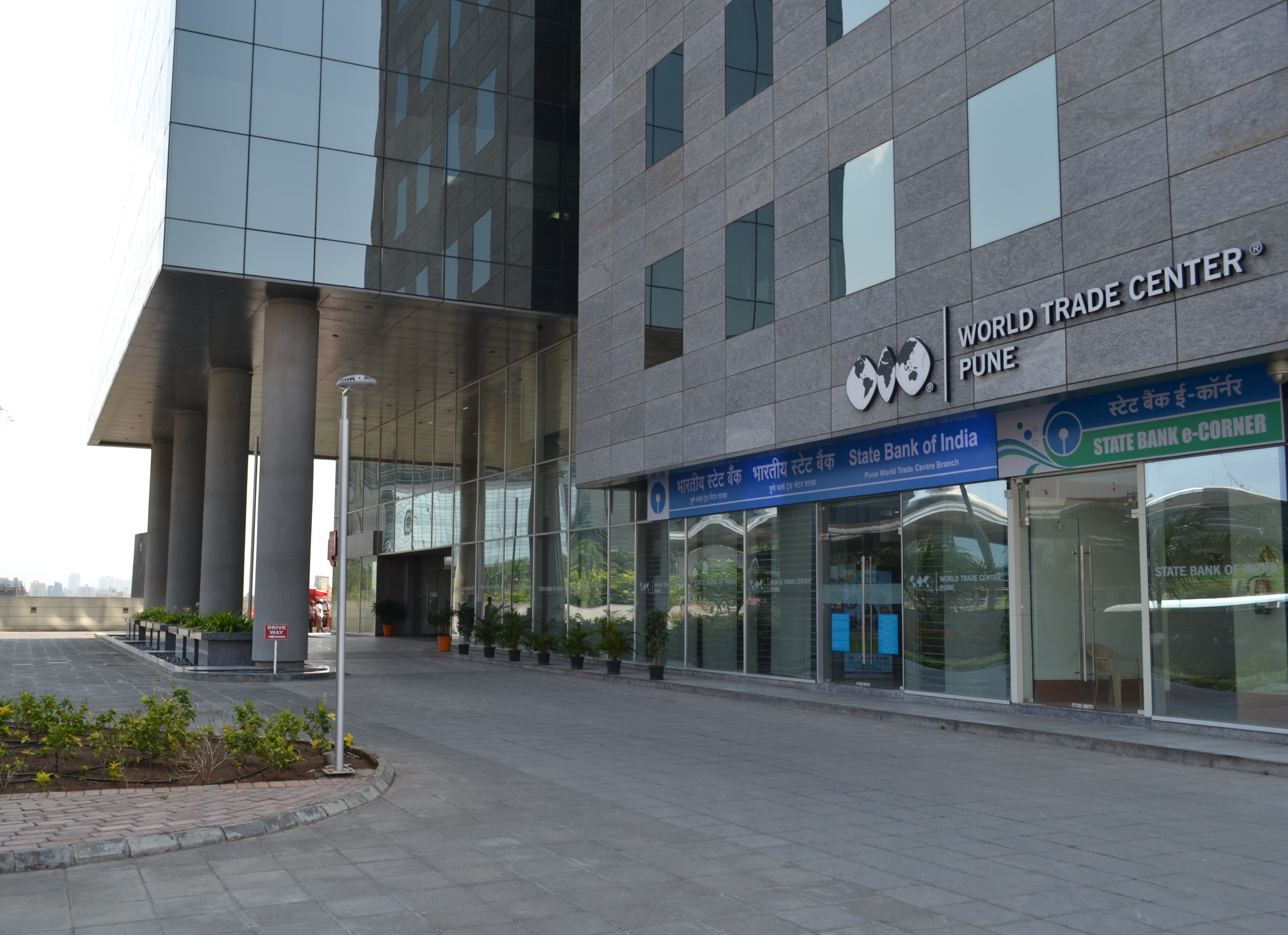
World Trade Center, Pune.

Pune is a well known manufacturing and industrial center of India. With an estimated nominal GDP of Rs. 3,31,478 crores for year 2019–20, Pune District is the third largest contributor to the economy of Maharashtra, after Mumbai and Thane. Pune has the fifth largest metropolitan economy and the sixth highest per capita income in the country. As per the Directorate of Economics and Statistics (Government of Maharashtra), the GDP per capita of Pune District in 2019–20 was Rs. 3,16,848. In 2014–15, the manufacturing sector provided employment to over 500,000 people.

=== Manufacturing ===
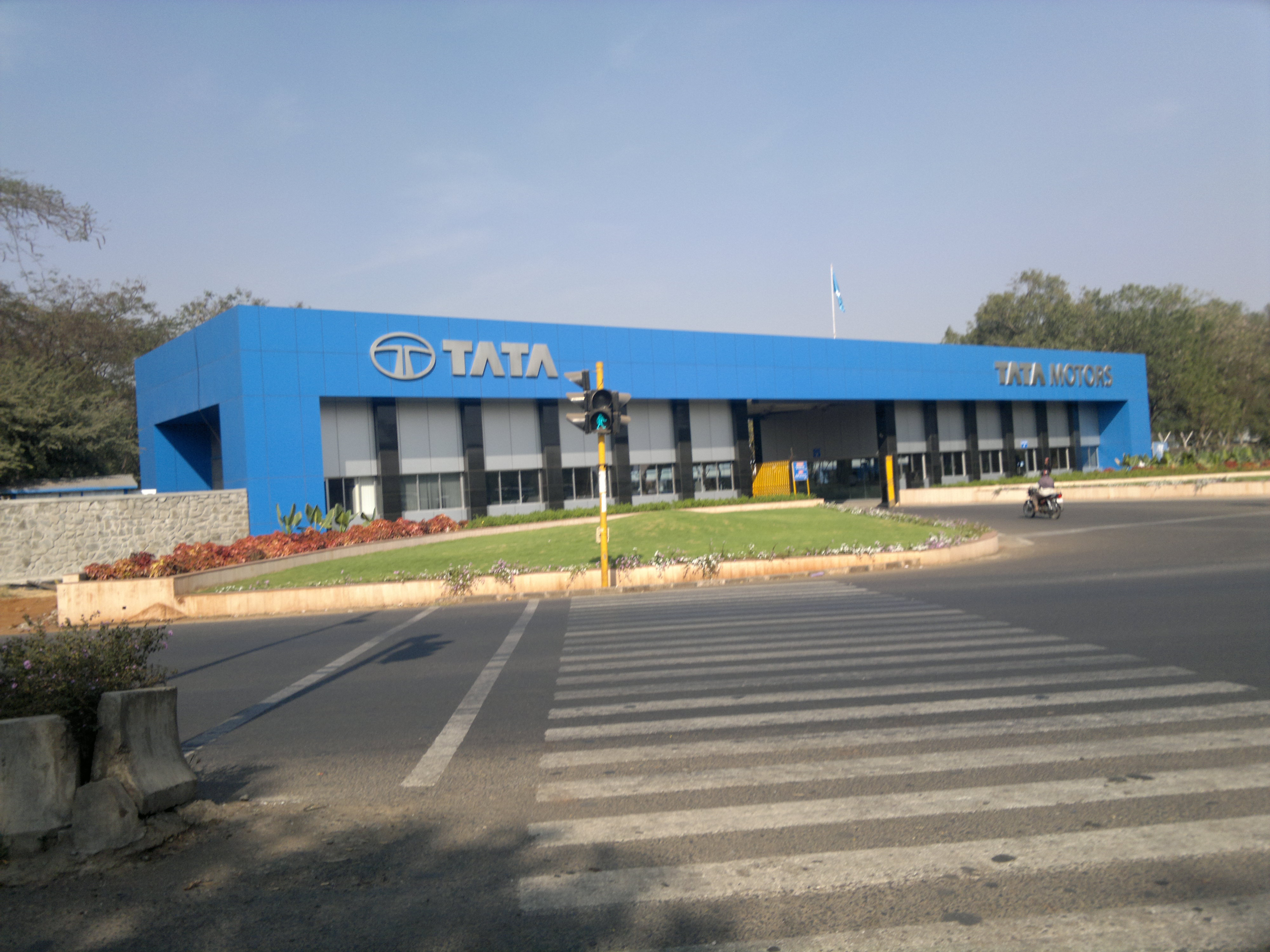
Tata motors vehicle manufacturing plant in Chinchwad

The formation of MIDC in 1962 resulted in a constant process of industrial land acquisition and the creation of required support infrastructure. Since then, there has been a massive influx of several European companies who continue to be keen on setting up manufacturing facilities in the city. The city serves as headquarters to many companies. Major industrial areas around Pune are Chakan, Chinchwad, Bhosari, Pirangut, Hinjawadi, Talegaon, Talawade, Urse. The Independent referred Chakan as India's "Motor City". The Kirloskar Group, one of India's largest manufacturers and exporters of pumps and the largest infrastructure pumping project contractor in Asia, is headquartered in Pune. Kalyani Group headquartered in Pune owns Bharat Forge which operates world's largest single location forging facility consisting of fully automated forging press lines and state-of-the-art machining facility in Pune. Bajaj Auto, headquartered in Pune, is ranked as the world's fourth largest two and three wheeler manufacturer.

The city is known for its automotive industry. A large number of automobile companies such as Bajaj Auto, Tata Motors, Mahindra & Mahindra, Skoda cars, Mercedes Benz, Force Motors, Kinetic Motors, General Motors, Land Rover, Jaguar, Renault, Volkswagen, and Fiat have there manufacturing plants in Chakan. Serum Institute of India, the world's fifth largest vaccine producer by volume, is based in Pune.

As of August 2023, Tesla, Inc. has leased a space in Pune, marking its initial step towards establishing a presence in India.

=== Information technology ===
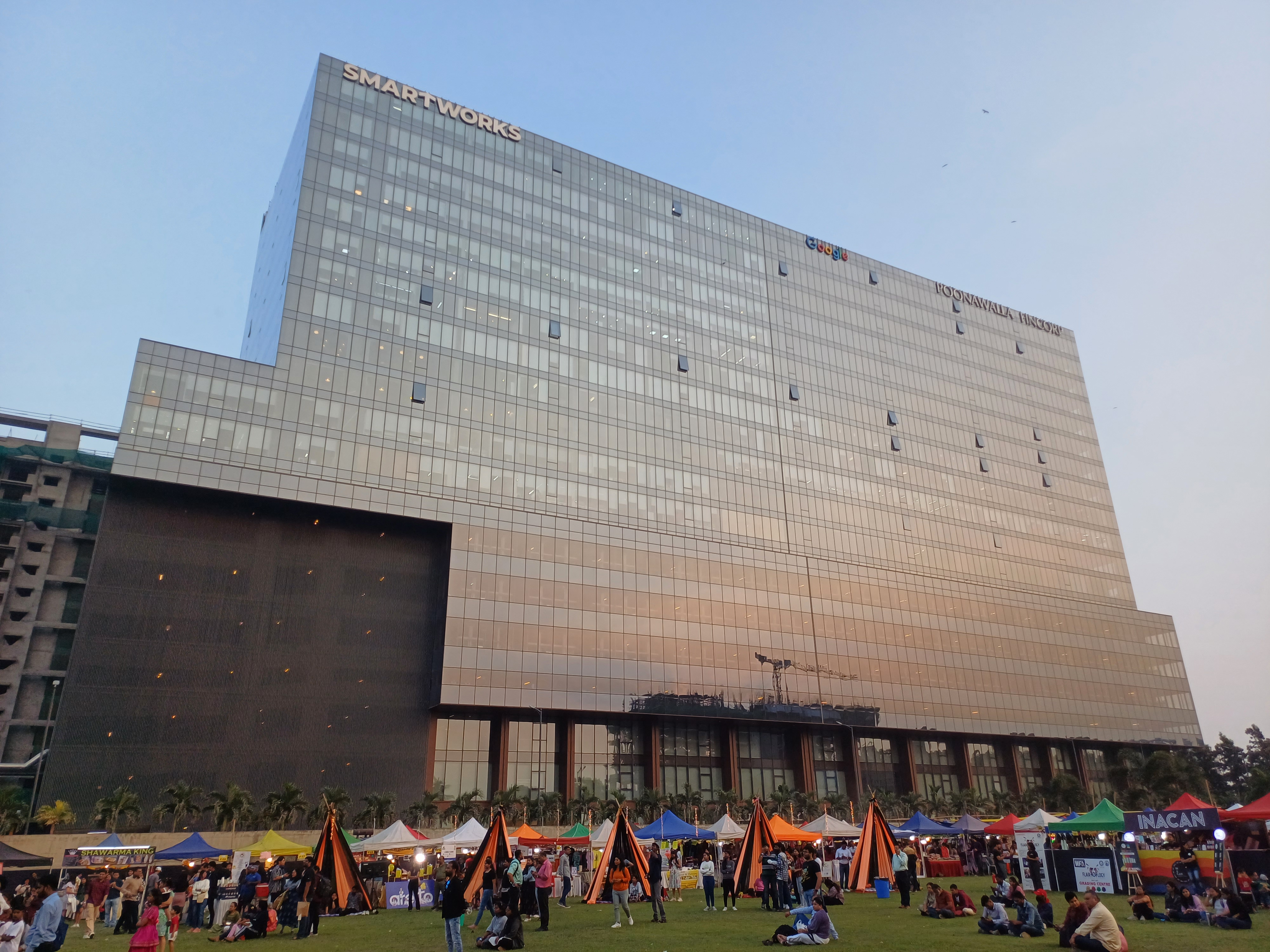
Google Office

Cerebrum IT Park

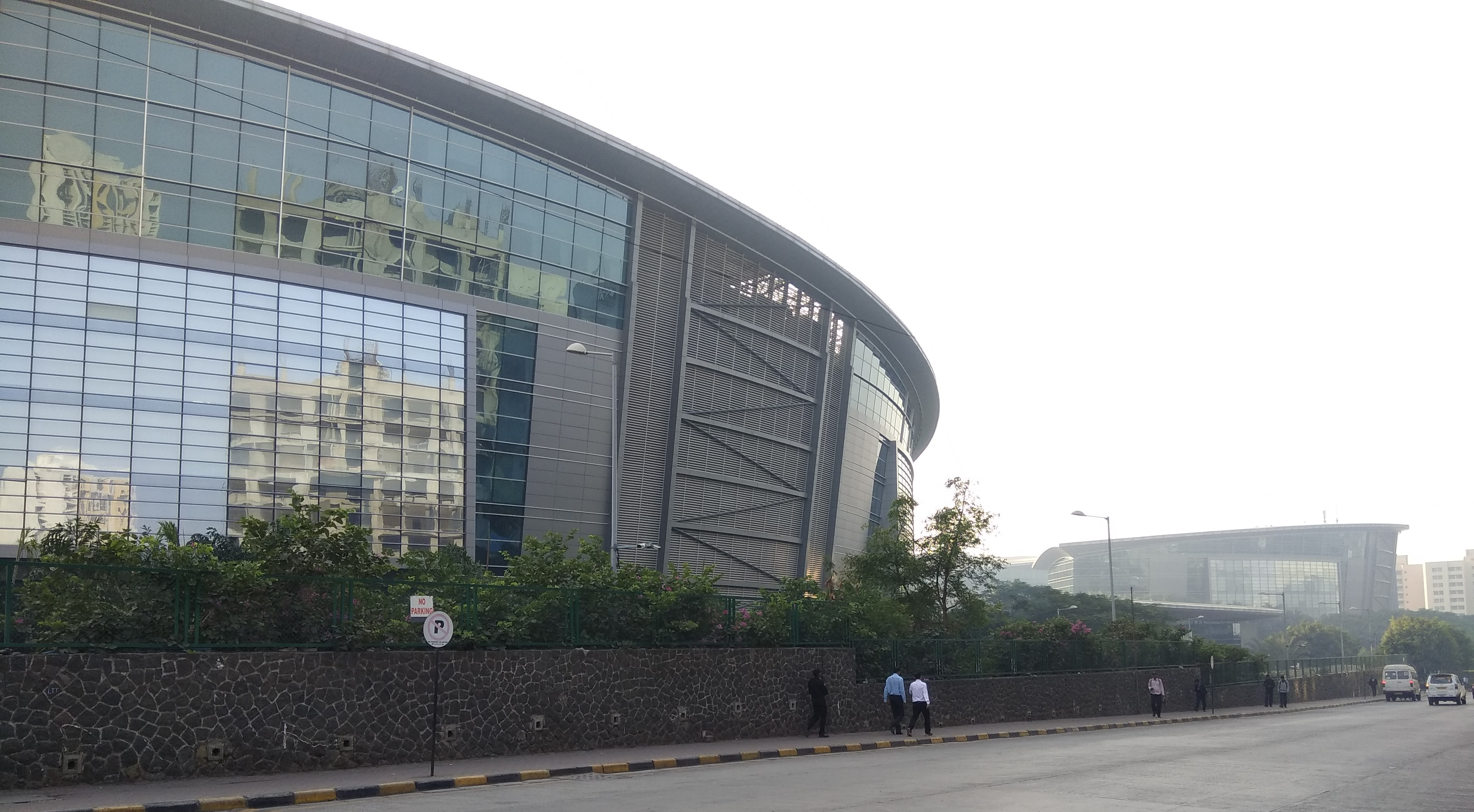
EON IT park, Kharadi

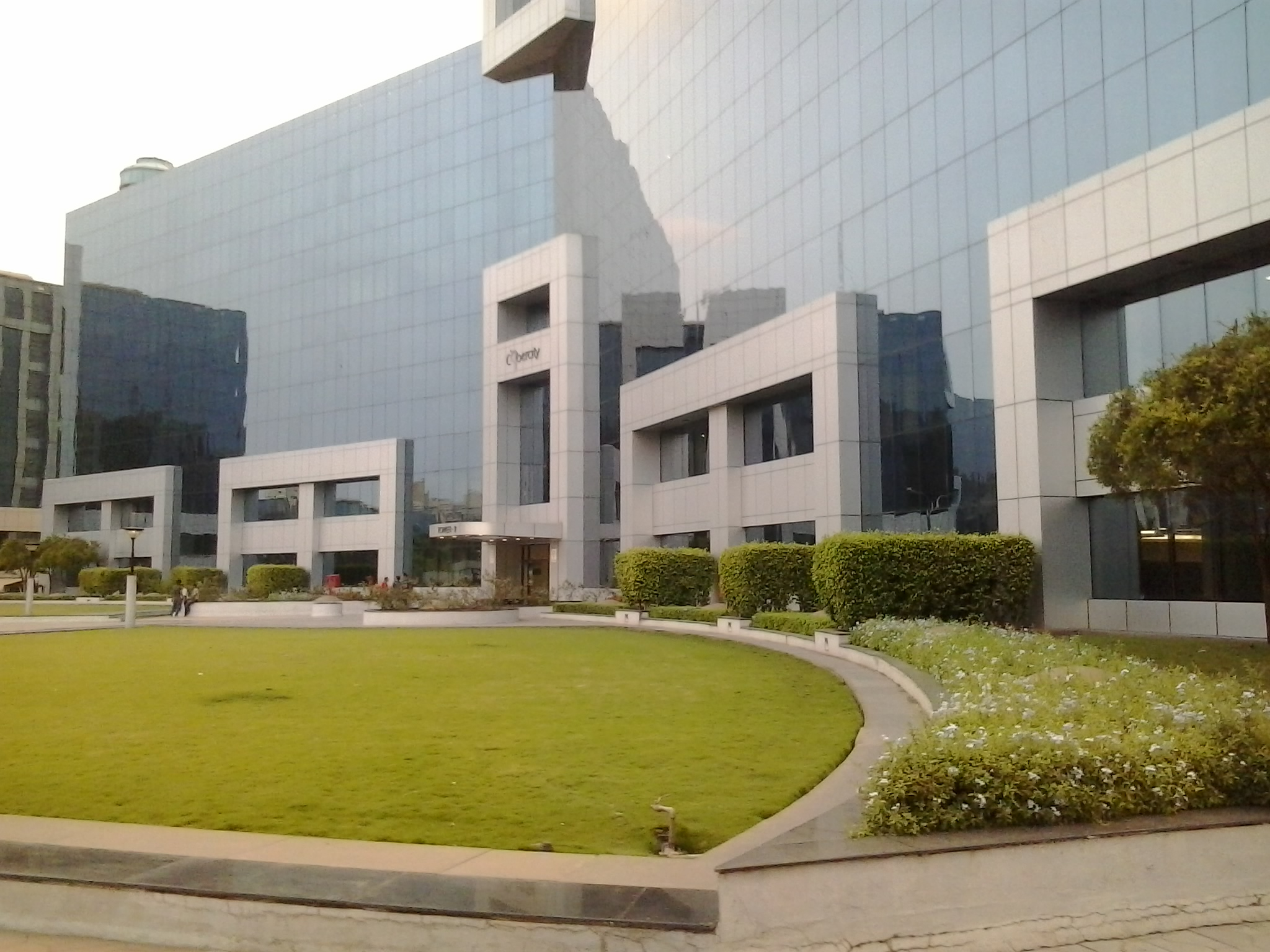
Cybercity, Magarpatta

The Rajiv Gandhi Infotech Park in Hinjawadi is a ₹ 60,000 crore (US$8.9 billion) project by the Maharashtra Industrial Development Corporation (MIDC). The IT Park encompasses an area of about 2,800 acres (11 km^{2}) and is home to over 800 IT companies. Besides Hinjawadi, IT companies are also located at Magarpatta, Kharadi and several other parts of the city. As of 2017, the IT sector employed more than 300,000 people. Pune has also emerged as a new hub for tech startups in India. NASSCOM, in association with MIDC, has started a co-working space for city based startups under its 10,000 startups initiative at Kharadi MIDC. Pune Food Cluster development project is an initiative funded by the World Bank. It is being implemented with the help of Small Industries Development Bank of India, Cluster Craft to facilitate the development of the fruit and vegetable processing industries in and around Pune.

Major technology companies Ubisoft Pune, Zensar Technologies, Patni Computer Systems, Persistent Systems, Indiacom, Harbinger Knowledge Products, Seniority, Monjin, Mylab Discovery Solutions, Quick Heal and KPIT Technologies are headquartered in Pune. Indian tech giant Infosys was founded in Pune who have a mega campus in city. Zensar Technologies is located in a mega campus called Zensar Park.

=== Entertainment ===
Pune is an emerging centre for VFX services, with Indian and international studios such as Anibrain, Reliance Animation, Digikore Studio, HMX Media, Waffold Pune, Stereo D, Framestore and Method Studios having established their facilities here.

The Meetings, Incentives, Conferencing, Exhibitions trade is expected to be boosted since the Pune International Exhibition and Convention Centre (PIECC) opened in 2017. The 97-hectare PIECC has a seating capacity of 20,000 with a floor area of 13,000 m^{2} (139,931 sq ft). It has seven exhibition centres, a convention centre, a golf course, a five-star hotel, a business complex, shopping malls, and residences. The US$115 million project was developed by the Pimpri-Chinchwad New Town Development Authority. There are many food joints around Pune which makes it a favourite outing destination.

World Trade Center (WTC) Pune is a 1.6 million sq. ft. complex built to foster international trade. WTC Pune is part of the World Trade Centers Association.

== Culture ==
=== Architecture ===
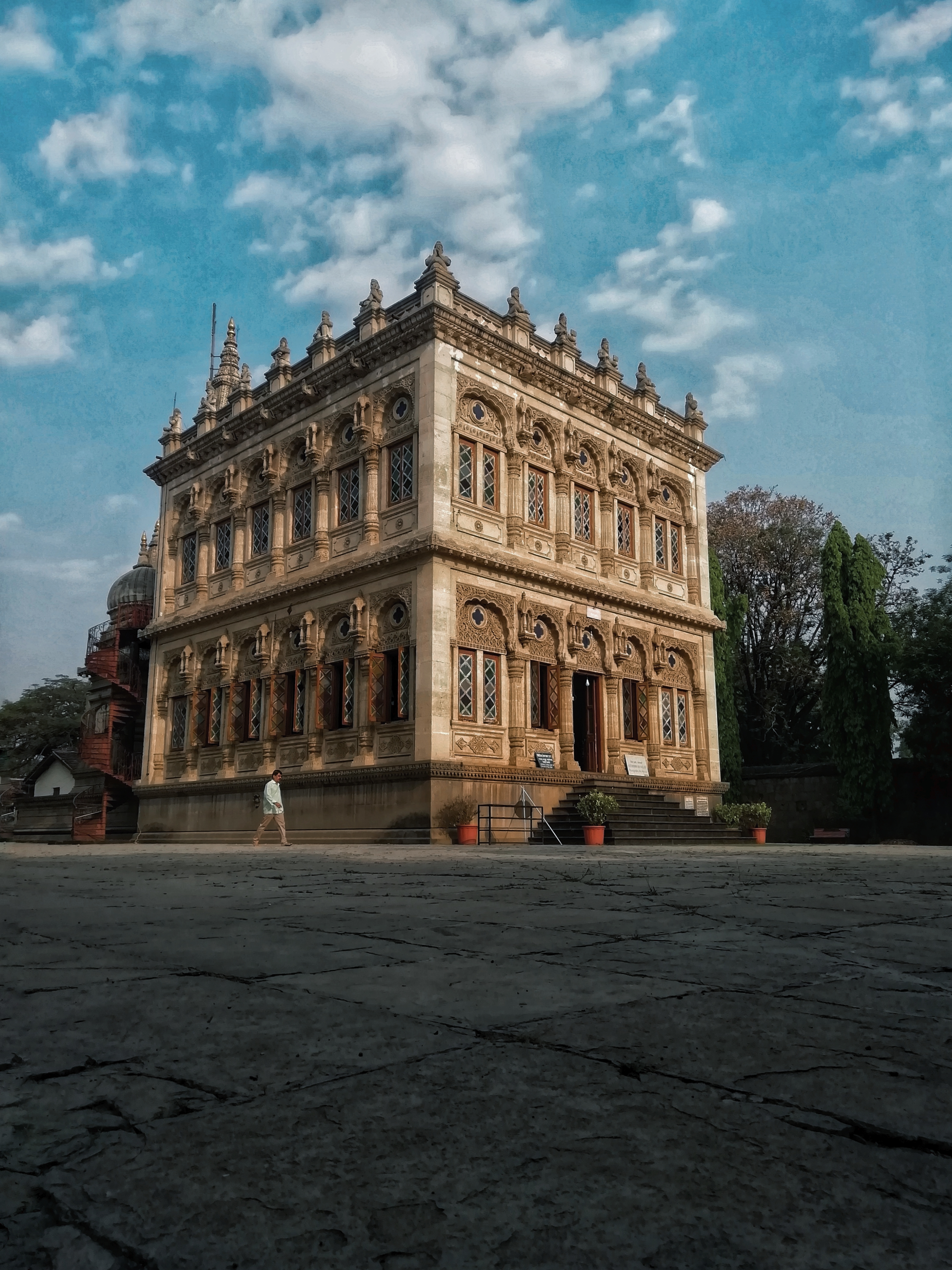
Shinde Chhatri in Wanowrie

Historical attractions include the 8th century rock-cut Pataleshwar Caves temple, the 18th century Shaniwar Wada, the 19th century Aga Khan Palace, Lal Mahal and Sinhagad fort. Shinde Chhatri, located at Wanowrie, is a memorial dedicated to the Maratha general Mahadaji Shinde (Scindia). The old city had many residential buildings with courtyards called Wada. However, many of these have been demolished and replaced by modern buildings.

A renowned wada in Pune is the last residential palace of the Peshwa called Vishrambaug Wada which is currently being renovated by the city corporation. The city is also known for its British Raj bungalow architecture and the Garden Cities Movement layout of the Cantonment from the early 20th century. Landmark architectural works by Christopher Charles Benninger surround the city, including the Mahindra United World College of India, the Centre for Development Studies and Activities, the YMCA Retreat at Nilshi and the Samundra Institute of Maritime Studies.

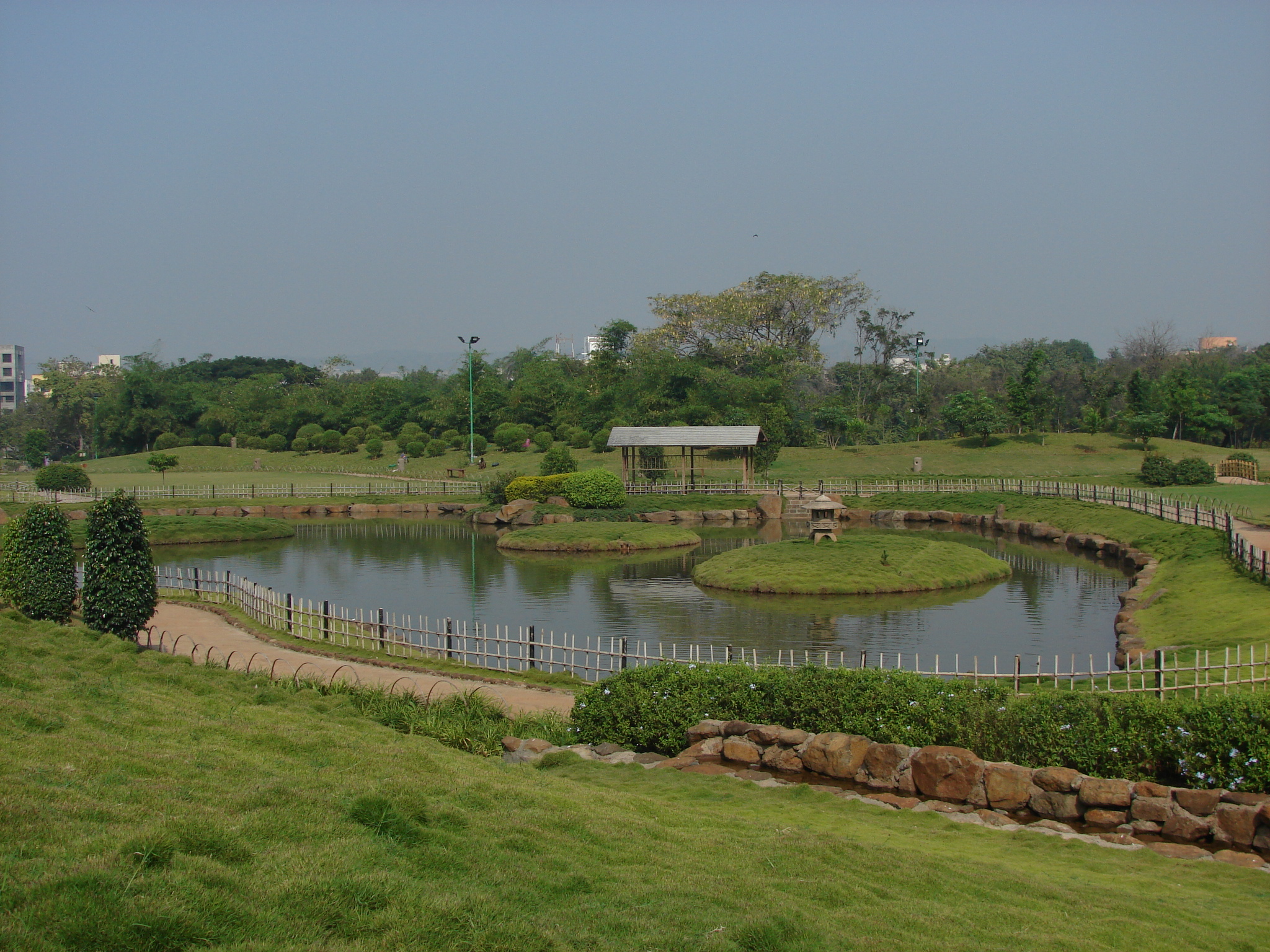
Pu. La. Deshpande Garden.

=== Museums, parks and zoos ===
Museums in Pune include the Raja Dinkar Kelkar Museum, Mahatma Phule Industrial Museum, Deccan college museum of Maratha history, Dr. Babasaheb Ambedkar Museum, Joshi's Museum of Miniature Railway and the Pune Tribal Museum Pune also houses Blades of Glory Cricket Museum which is the biggest cricket museum in the world. The College of Military Engineering has an archive and an equipment museum; this includes a rail exhibit with a metre-gauge train. The Aga Khan Palace, where Mahatma Gandhi was interned during the Quit India movement, has a memorial dedicated to his wife, Kasturba Gandhi who died during the internment.

For a city of its size, Pune has very few large public parks and gardens. Parks and green spaces in the city include the Kamala Nehru Park, Sambhaji Park, Shahu Udyan, Peshwe Park, Saras Baug, Empress Gardens, and Bund Garden. The Pu La Deshpande Udyan is a replica of the Korakuen Garden in Okayama, Japan. The Hanuman hill, Vetal hill, and Taljai Hills are protected nature reserves on hills within the city limits.

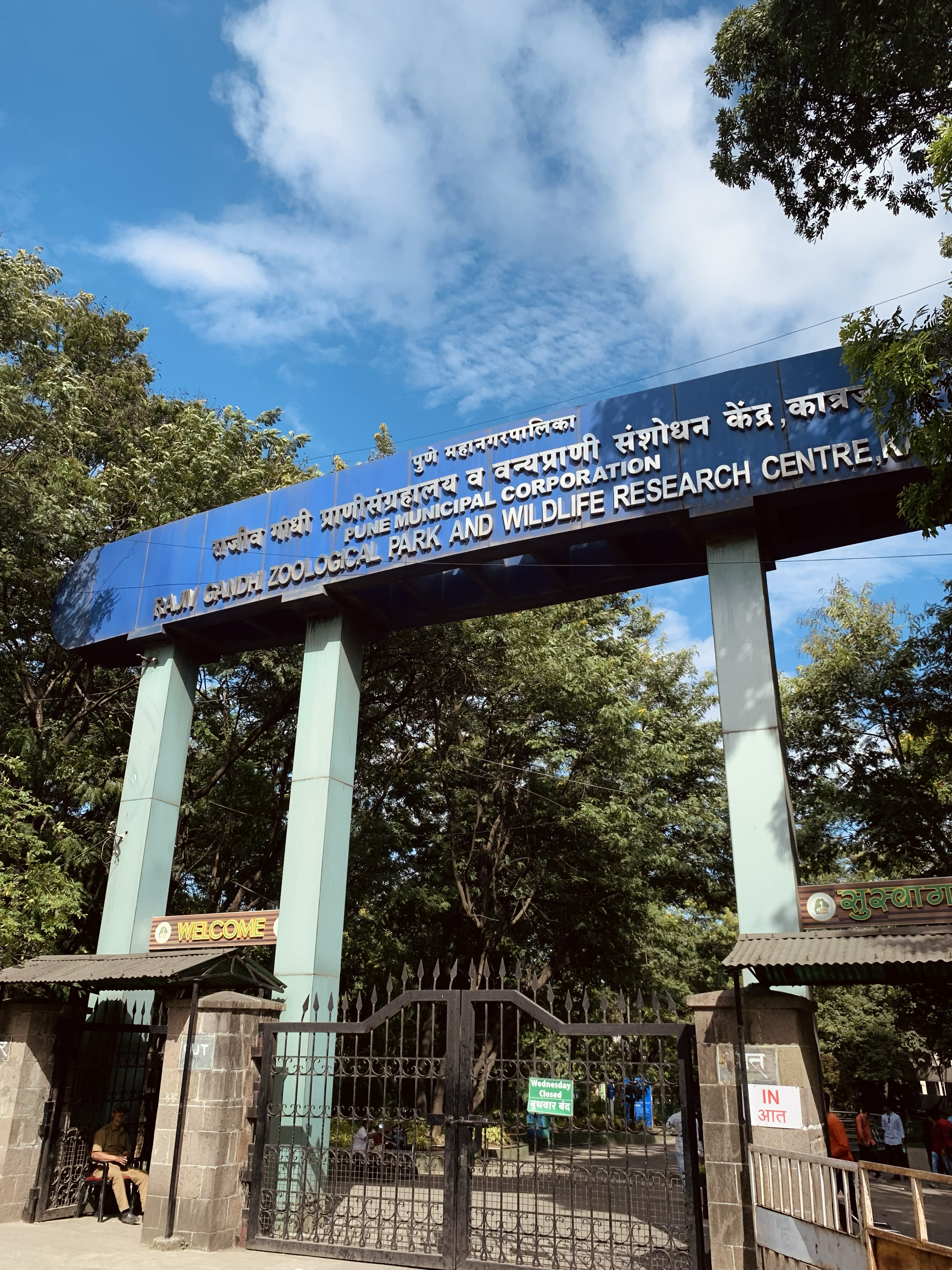
Rajiv Gandhi Zoological Park

The Rajiv Gandhi Zoological Park is located in Katraj. The zoo, earlier located at Peshwe Park, was merged with the reptile park at Katraj in 1999. Pune Riverfront is under-construction being developed by Pune Municipal Corporation along the banks of Mula-Mutha River.

=== Performing arts ===
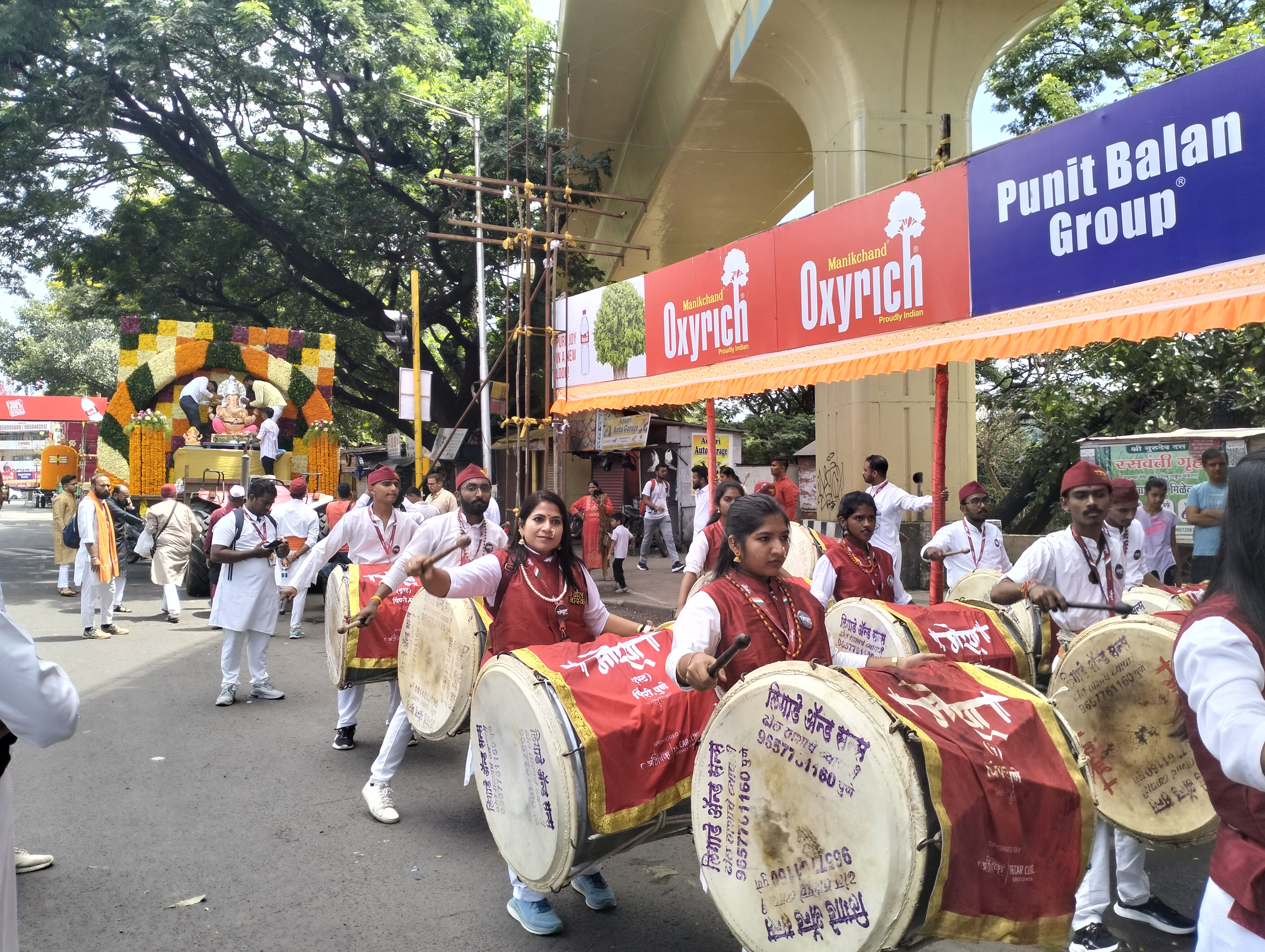
Ganesh Chaturthi procession

Both experimental and professional theatre receive extensive patronage from the Marathi community. The Tilak Smarak Ranga Mandir, Bal Gandharva Ranga Mandir, Bharat Natya Mandir, Yashwantrao Chavan Natya Gruha, and Sudarshan Rangmanch are prominent theatres in the city.

Ganesh Kala Krida Rangamanch is the largest indoor theatre in the city, with a seating capacity of approximately 45,000. The Sawai Gandharva Sangeet Mahotsav, one of the most prominent and sought-after Indian classical music festivals in India, is held in Pune every year in December. It commemorates the life and achievements of Sawai Gandharva. The concept of Diwāḷī Pahāṭ (lit. Diwali dawn) originated in Pune as a music festival on the morning of the festival of Diwali.

=== Festivals ===
Ganesh Chaturthi is widely and publicly celebrated in Pune. Lokamanya Bal Gangadhar Tilak started the public celebration of the festival as a means to circumvent the colonial British government ban on Hindu gatherings through its anti-public assembly legislation in 1892. Pandals with Ganesh idols are erected all across Pune. Many Ganesh mandals display live or figurine shows called Dekhava during the festival. These shows often carry socially relevant messages. Processions of Ganpati are accompanied by Dhol-Tasha pathaks (groups who play Dhol-Tasha percussion instruments). Involvement of these pathaks has become a cultural identity of Pune with there being over 150 such groups operating in and around Pune. Jnana Prabodhini, a social organisation in Pune is widely accredited for founding the tradition of Dhol-Tasha pathaks.

== Food ==
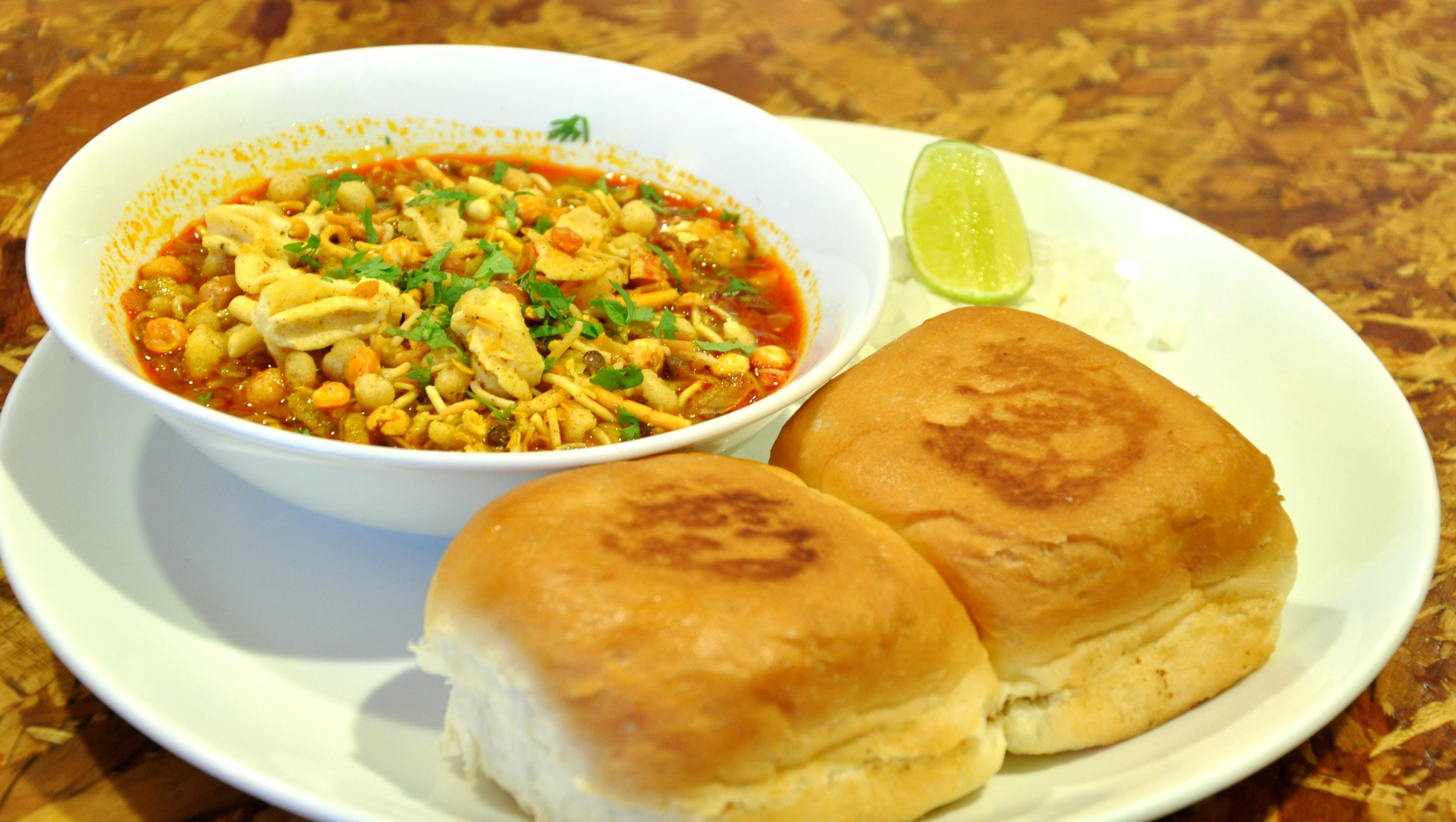
Puneri misal

The main cuisine of Pune is Maharashtrian cuisine. Puneri misal is one of the popular vegetarian dishes in Pune. Other famous dishes in Pune include Poha, Upma, Vada Pav, Bhel, Pani Puri, Dabeli, Sabudana vada, Pav Bhaji. Bakarwadi is a popular snack from Pune introduced in the early 1960s. Here are some of the most popular food streets in Pune:

- JM Road is famous for Vada Pav, Misal Pav, and Pav Bhaji.
- FC Road (Fergusson College Road) is famous for Street sandwiches, Dosas, Shawarmas, and Cold Coffee.
- Tulshibaug is famous for Kanda Bhaji, Puran Poli, and Chaat.
- East Street (Camp) is famous for Burgers, Rolls, and Desserts.
- Hong Kong Lane (Near Deccan Gymkhana) is famous for Momos, Chinese street food, and Chaats.
- Katraj Dairy Area is famous for Dairy products, Lassi, and Ice Cream.

== Transport ==
=== Air ===
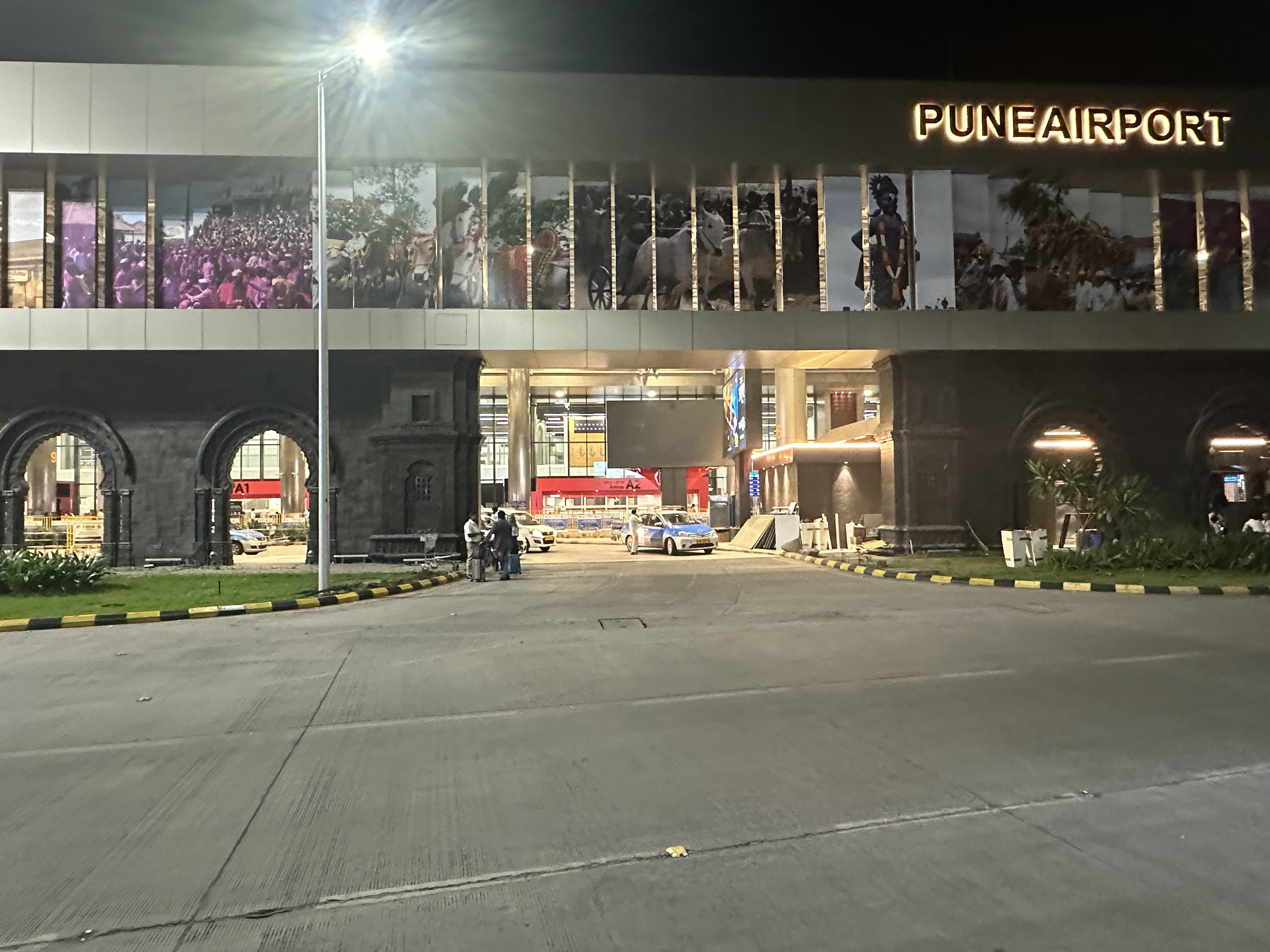
Pune Airport

Pune International Airport at Lohagaon is one of the busiest airports in India. The airport is operated by the Airports Authority of India. It shares its runways with the neighbouring Indian Air Force base. In addition to domestic flights to all major Indian cities, the airport has international direct flights to Dubai, operated by Air India Express, and SpiceJet, and direct flights to Singapore operated by Vistara. Pune International Airport at Lohegaon was ranked third best in the category of 5–15 million passengers by Airport Service Quality in 2018.

A new international airport, Chhatrapati Sambhaji Maharaj International Airport has been proposed, due to the limited capacity of the existing airport. A location in the Chakan-Rajgurunagar area was chosen for the airport, but non-availability of land delayed the project for over a decade. In September 2016 the location was changed to Purandar, about 20 kilometres (12 mi) south-east of the city near the towns of Saswad and Jejuri. Changes in state government, delay or changes called for by the ministry of defence, or the Directorate General of Civil Aviation (DGCA), and local opposition has delayed the project by several years.But with approvals in place from relevant authorities the project is going to be making progress per a statement made by the civil aviation minister in June 2024.

=== Public transport ===
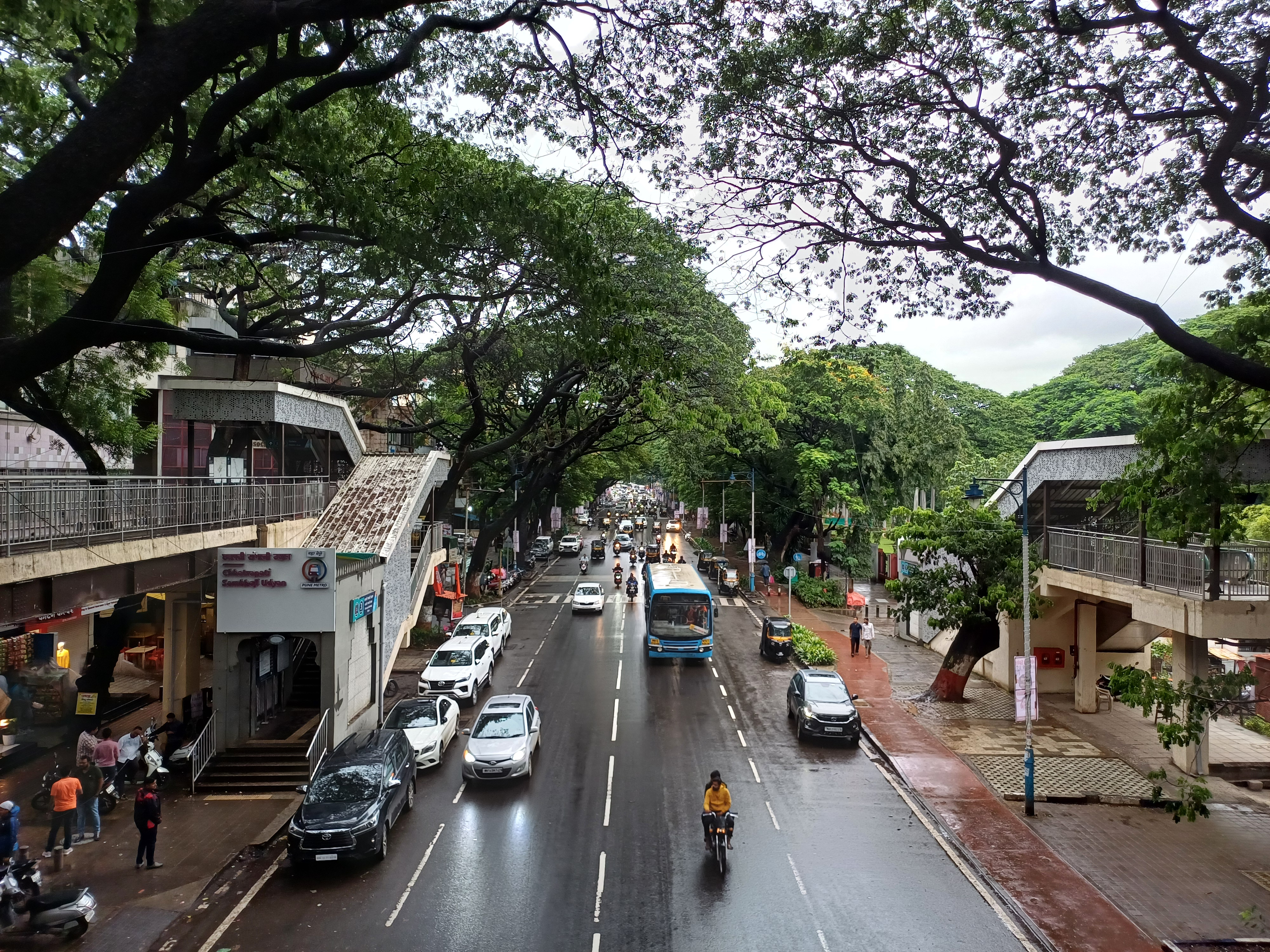
JM Road

Public transport in Pune include two operational lines of the Pune Metro, bus services operated by PMPML, the Pune Suburban Railway and auto rickshaws. Work is underway on an additional, third line of Pune Metro connecting the Hinjewadi IT hub to the District Court Pune station. This line is expected to open to the public by 2025.

==== Metro ====
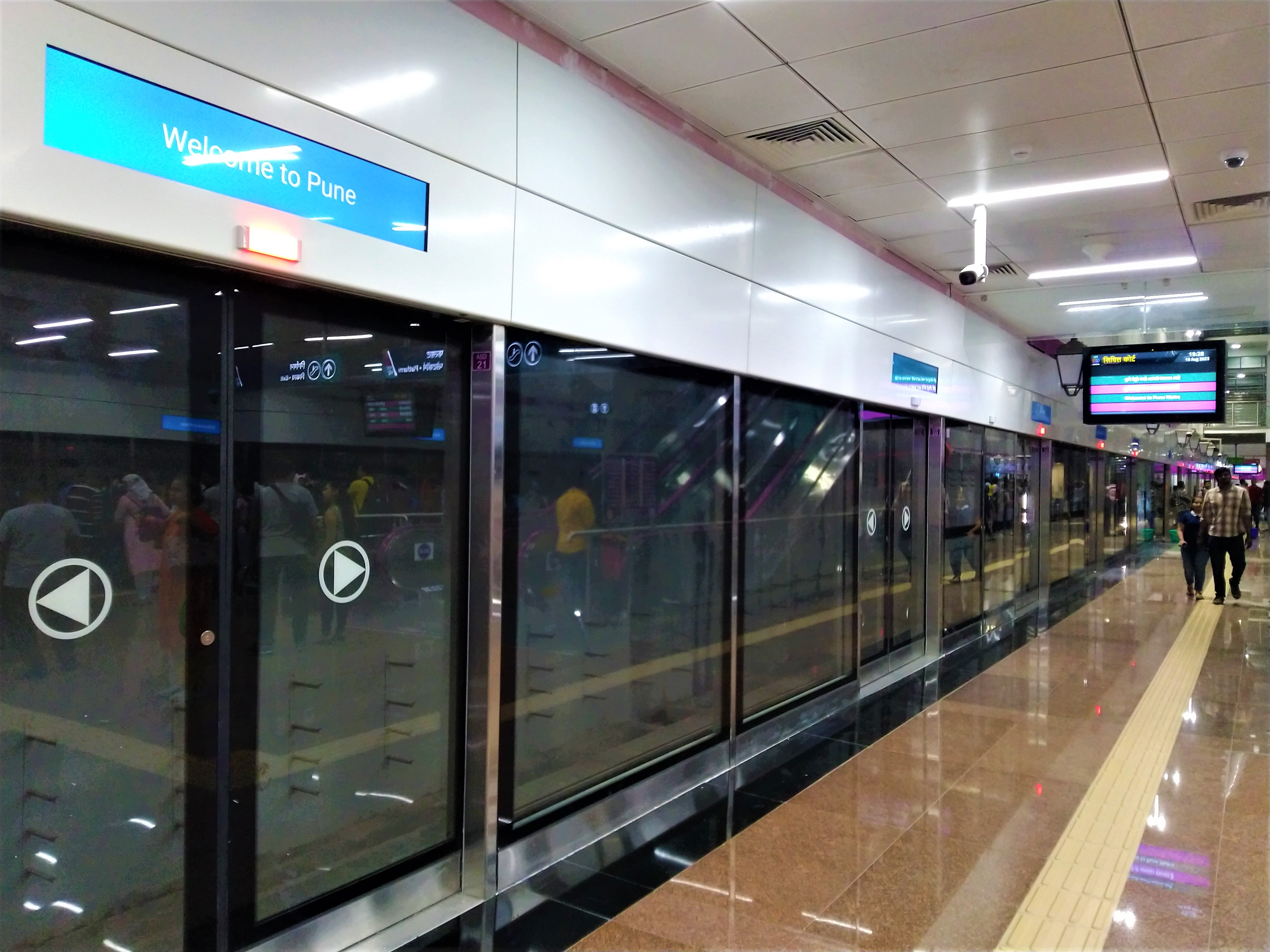
District Court Pune metro station

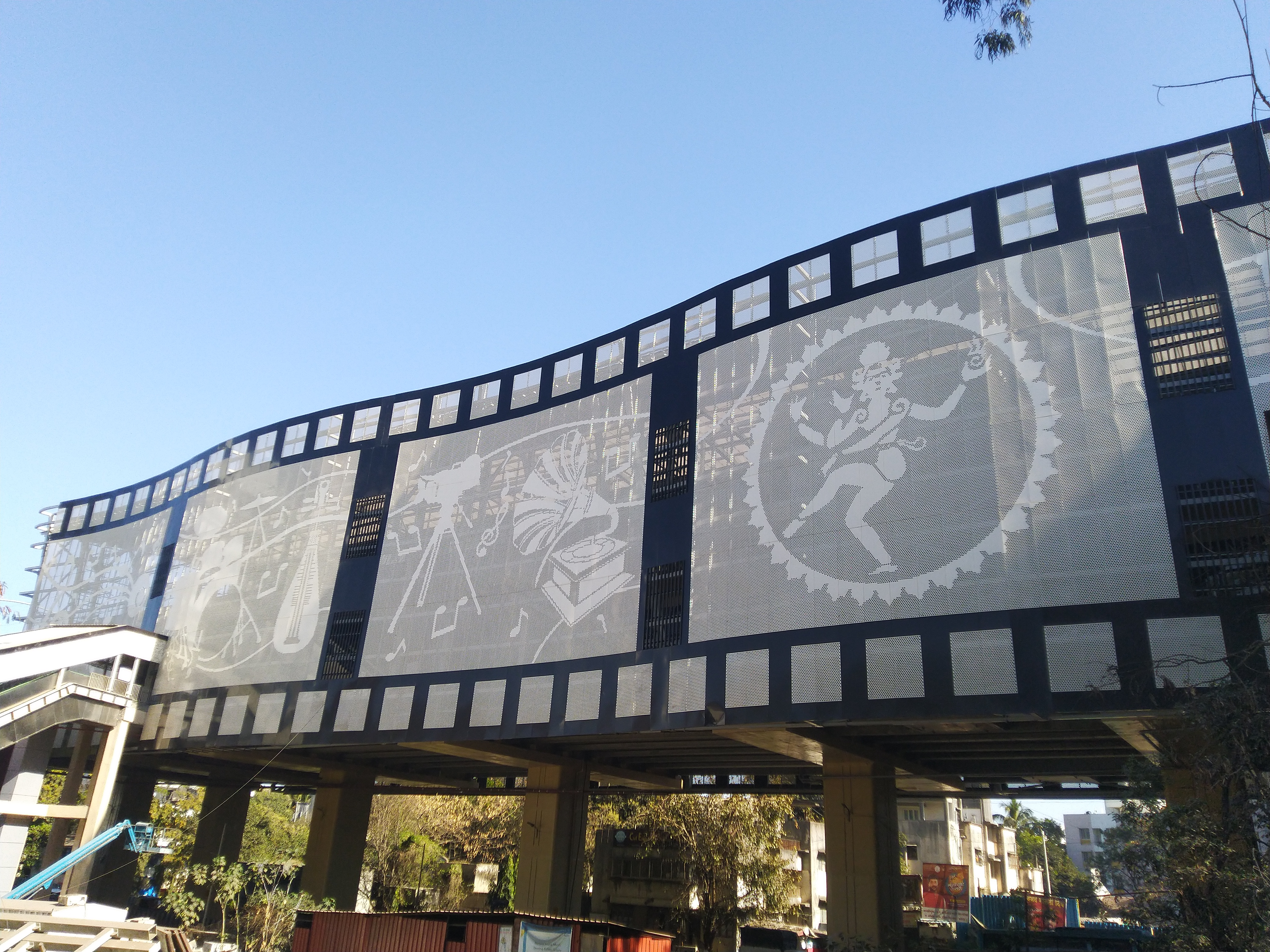
SNDT College metro station

Pune Metro is a mass rapid transit system serving the city. The system comprises two operational lines with a combined operational length of 31.25 km (19.42 mi). Construction for a third line is underway, which on completion would increase the combined operational length to 59.1 km.

The two operation lines are the Purple Line and the Aqua Line. The Purple Line starts from the Pimpri Chinchwad Municipal Corporation metro station and terminates at the Swargate metro station. The Aqua line starts from the Vanaz metro station and ends at the Ramwadi metro station. Both lines pass through the District Court Pune metro station, which as acts as a cross platform interchange.

The presently under construction Pink Line will plough from Megapolis Circle in Hinjawadi till the District Court Pune station. It will see a cross platform interchange at Shivaji Nagar (for the Purple Line) and District Court (for both, the Purple and Aqua lines).

==== Bus service ====
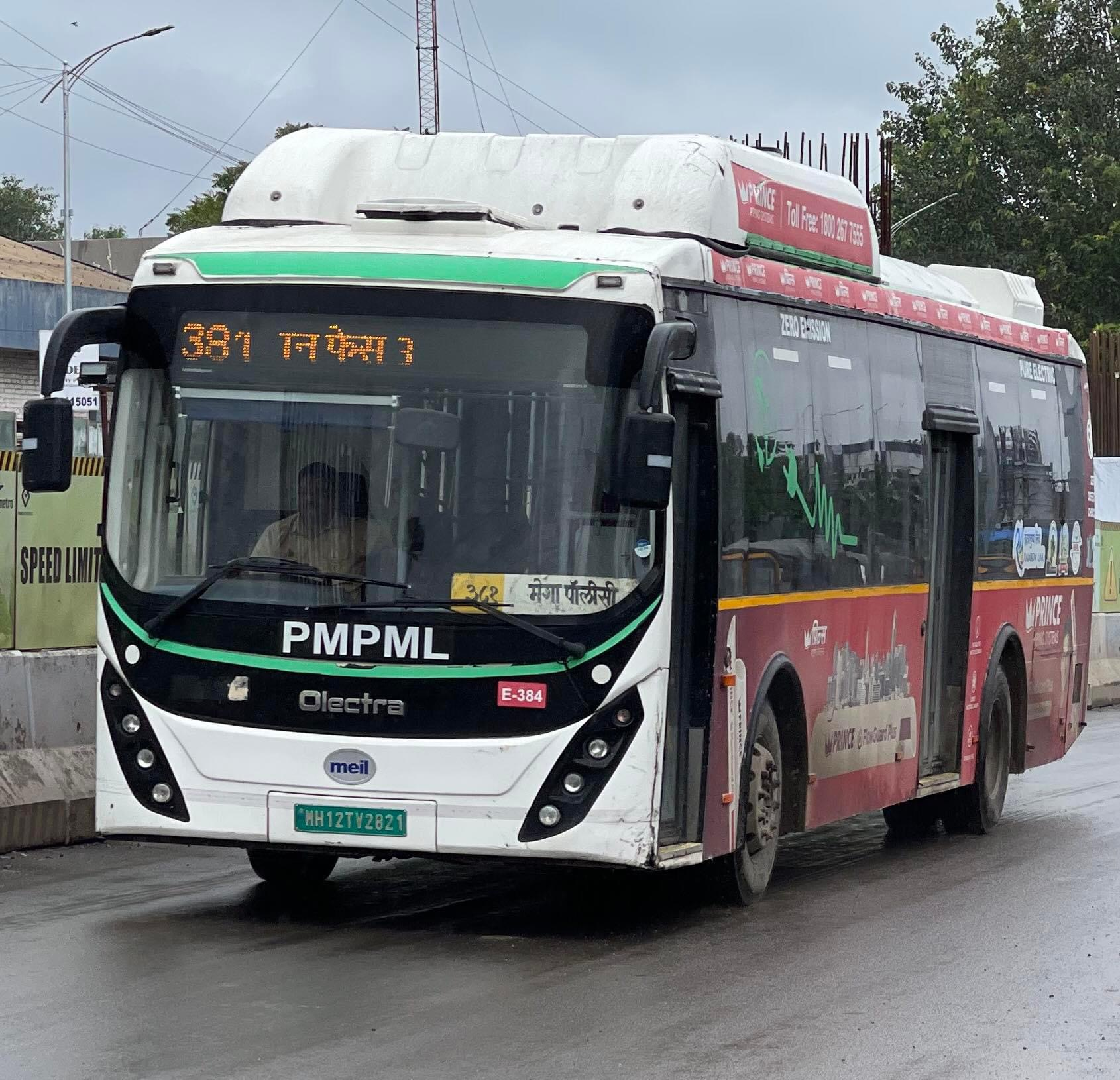
A PMPML Electric bus

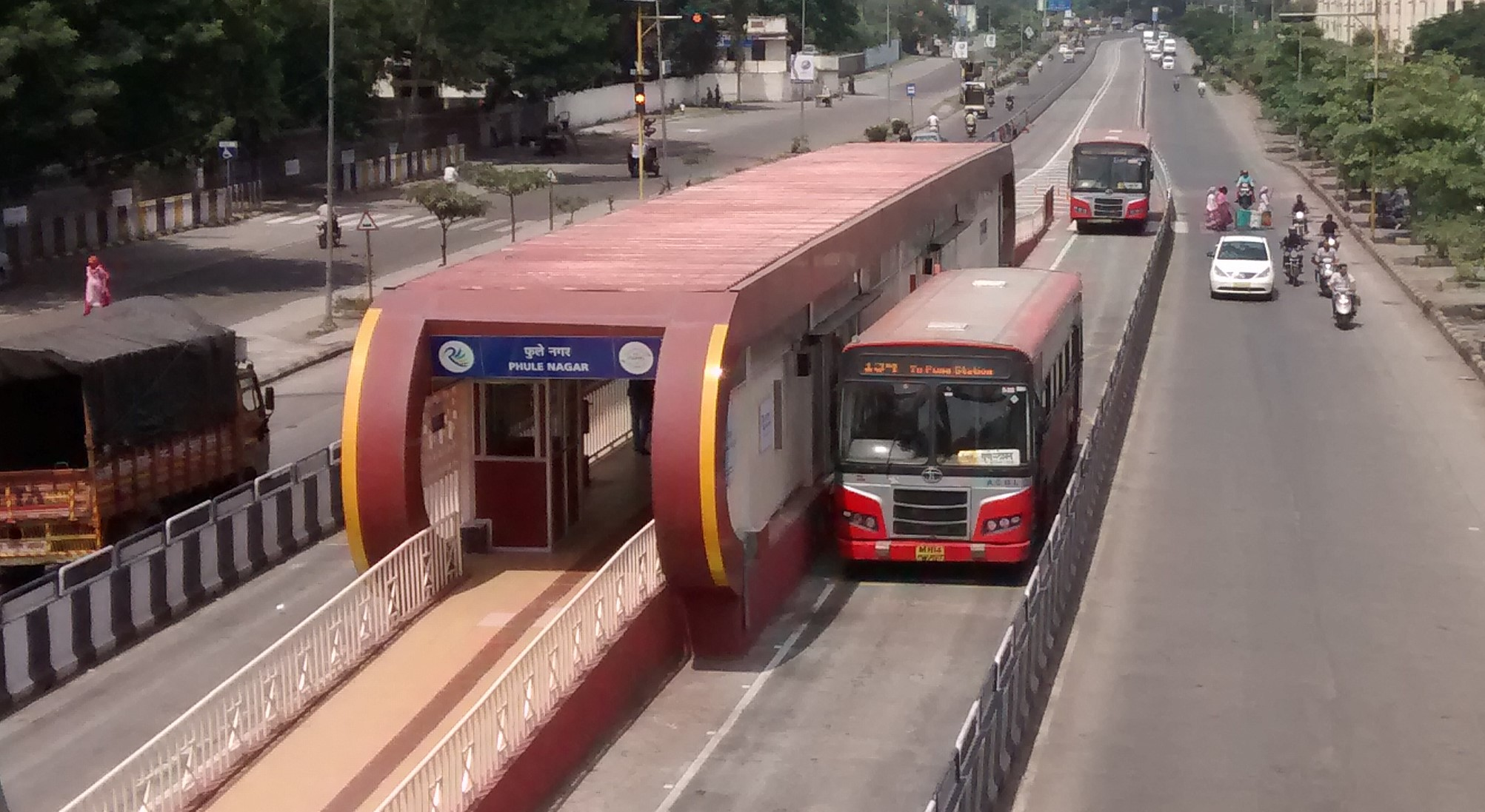
Phule Nagar BRT Station

Public buses within the city and its suburbs are operated by PMPML .In January 2019, Pune became the first Indian city to adopt e-buses and Bhekrai Nagar became the country's first all electric bus depot. As of January 2026, up to 490 electric buses have been deployed across the city.

PMPML operates the Rainbow BRTS system. When launched, it was the first of its kind in India bus rapid transit system in India. The project has turned out to be a failure, receiving little patronage from the local citizenry. As of 2023 only 16 km out of 68 km proposed were completed for the project. Due to the then ongoing metro construction related work and high incidences of accidents, dedicated bus lanes from Yerawda to Vimannagar were removed in 2023.

Maharashtra State Road Transport Corporation runs buses from stations in Wakdewadi, Pune station and Swargate to all major cities and towns in Maharashtra and neighbouring states. Private companies also run buses to major cities throughout India.

==== Rail ====
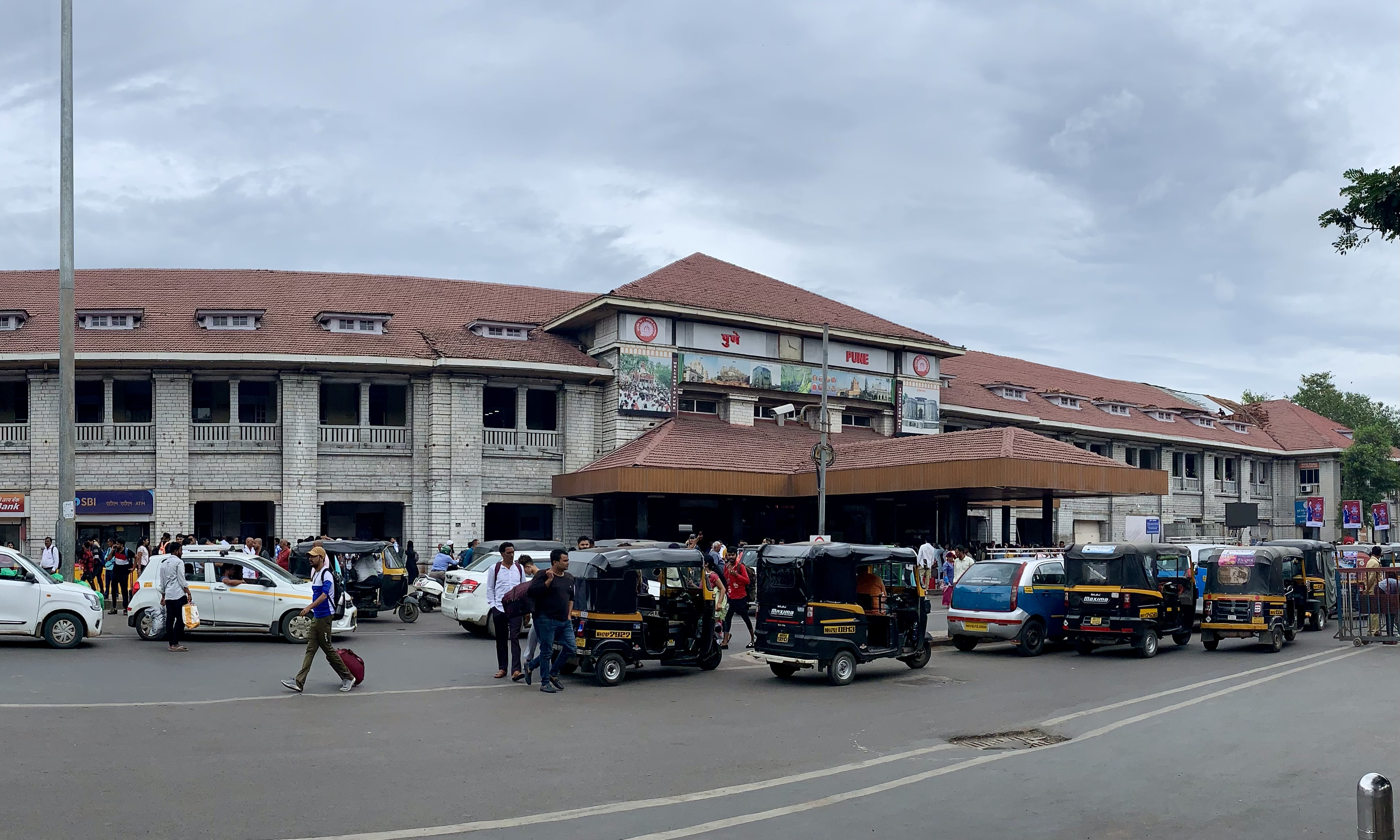
Pune Junction railway station

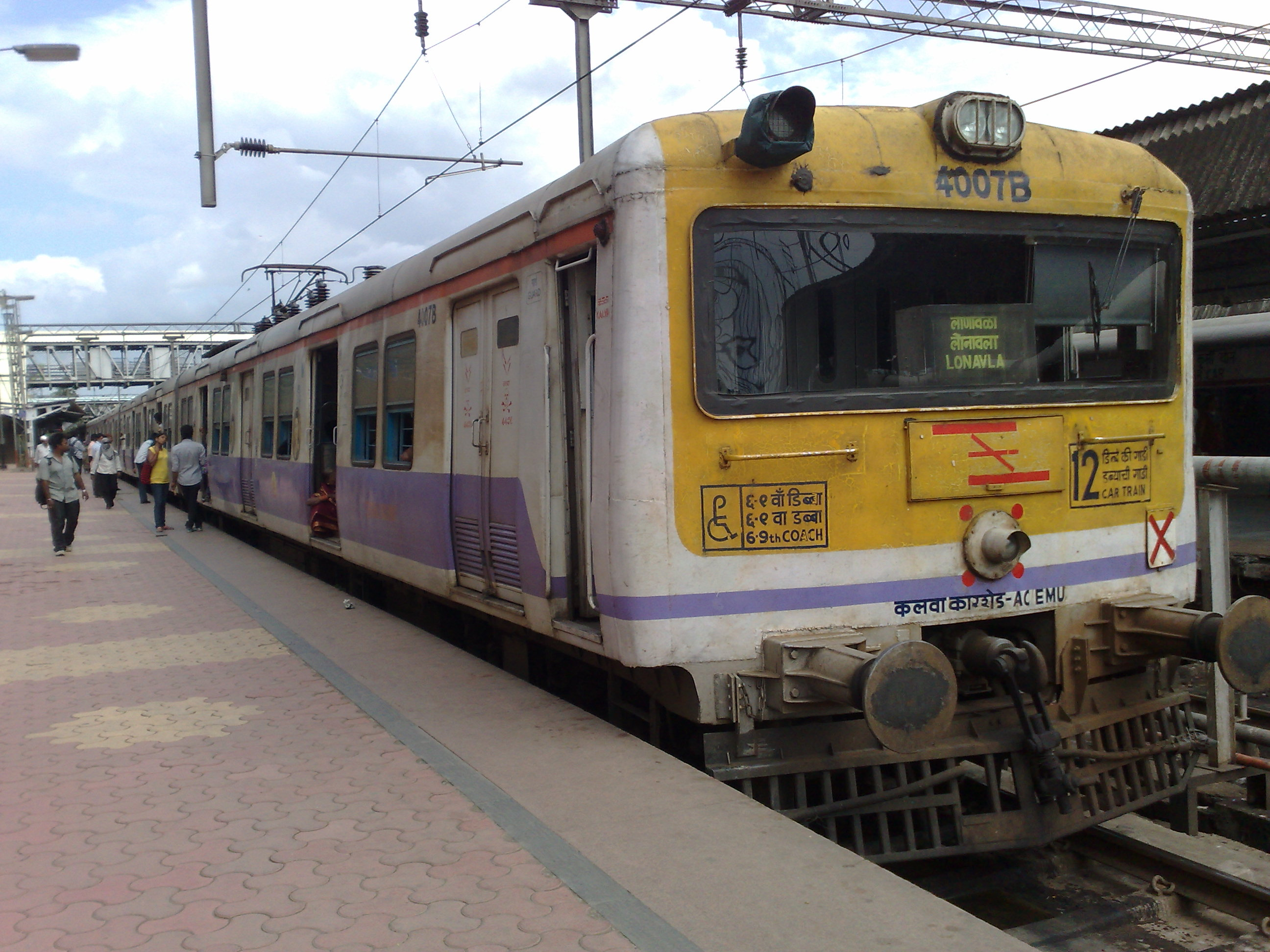
Pune Suburban Railway

The Pune Suburban Railway (popularly called local trains) connects Pune to the industrial city of Pimpri-Chinchwad and the hill station of Lonavala.

Daily express trains connect Pune to Mumbai, Nashik, Ahmedabad, Chennai, Delhi, Hyderabad, Nanded, Miraj-Sangli, Kolhapur Jaipur, Raipur, Nagpur, Visakhapatnam, Thiruvananthapuram, Kochi, Coimbatore, Bangalore, Allahabad, Kanpur, Howrah, Jammu Tawi, Vijayawada, Darbhanga, Goa, Gwalior, Varanasi, Bhubaneswar, Ranchi, Jalgaon, Patna, and Jamshedpur. At Pune, there is a diesel locomotive shed and an electric trip shed. Pune Railway Station is administered by the Pune Railway Division of Central Railways.

=== Road transport ===
Pune is well-connected to other cities by Indian and state highways. National Highway 48 connects it to Mumbai and Bangalore, National Highway 65 connects it to Hyderabad and National Highway 60 connects it to Nashik. State Highway 27 connects Pune to Ahmednagar.

The Mumbai Pune Expressway is India's first six-lane high-speed expressway, and it was built in 2002. Only four-wheeler vehicles are allowed on it. This expressway has reduced travel time between Pune and Mumbai to a little over two hours. Three ring roads are planned around the city.

Major highways:

- Delhi–Chennai (Via Mumbai and Bengaluru) Highway
- Pune–Nashik Highway
- Mumbai–Pune Expressway
- Pune–Hyderabad Highway
- Pune–Ahmednagar Highway
- Pune–Saswad Highway

==== Personal transport ====
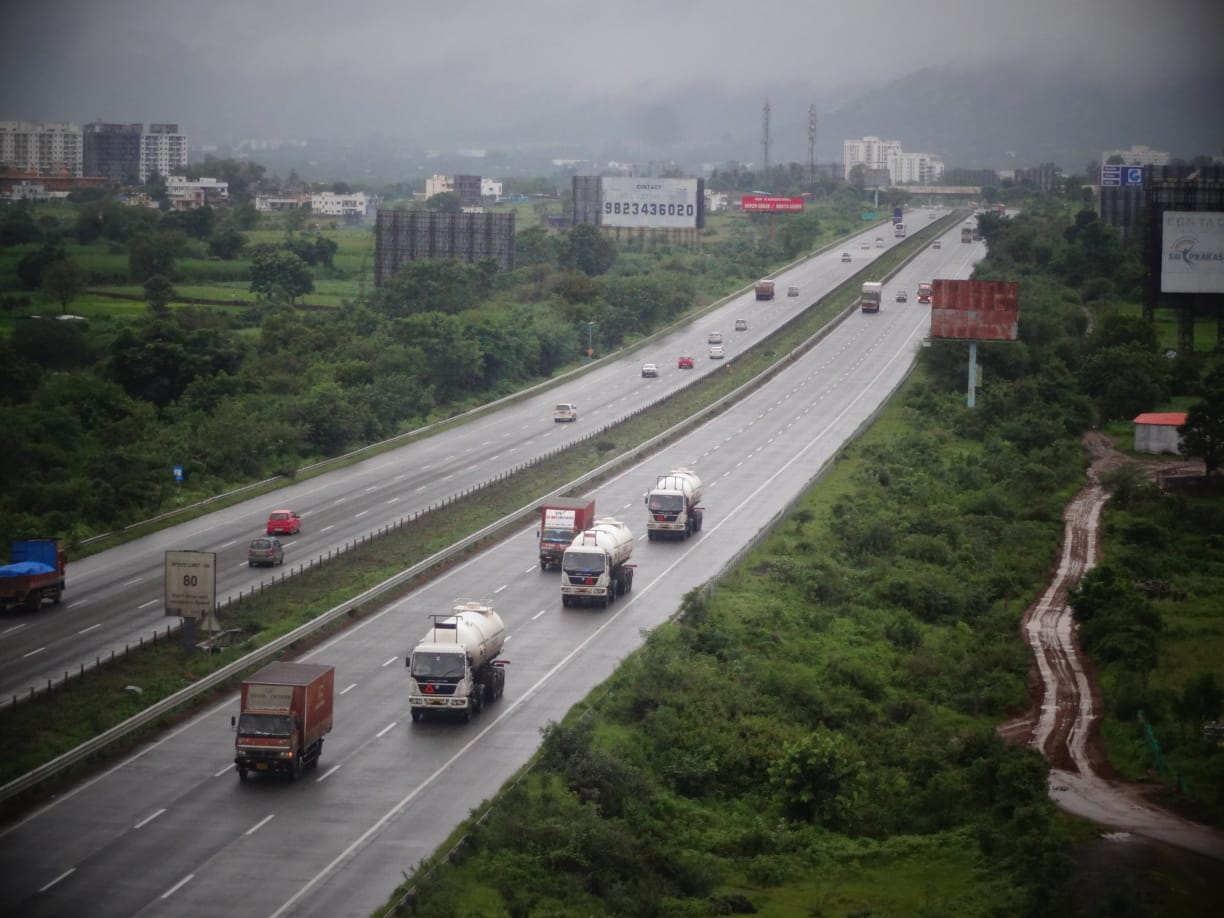
Mumbai Pune Expressway

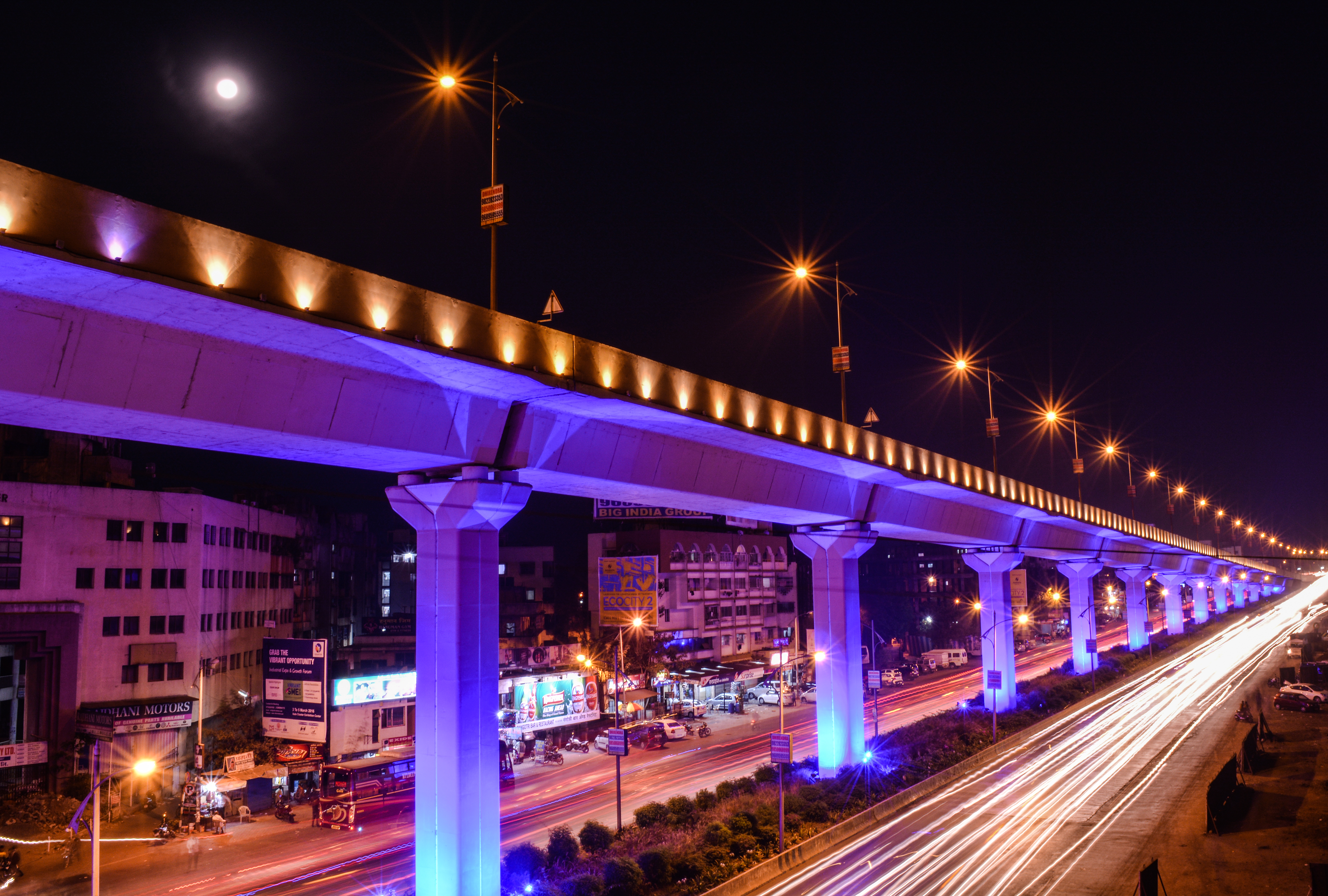
JRD Tata Bridge, Kasarwadi

Once known as the "cycle city of India", Pune has experienced a rapid growth in the number of motorised two wheelers replacing the bicycle. In 2005 the city was reported to have one million two wheelers. The report also stated that the increase in vehicular and industrial activity had led to a 10-fold increase in particulate pollution in some areas of the city. In 2018 the number of vehicles in the city has exceeded its population with 3.62 million total vehicles, 2.70 million being two wheelers. In the fiscal year 2017–18 alone 300,000 new vehicles were registered in the city, two-thirds of them two wheelers.

A revival of cycling in Pune with 130 kilometres (81 mi) of cycle tracks built was attempted as a part of the BRT system under the Jawaharlal Nehru National Urban Renewal Mission in 2004. However, a 2011 report revealed that only 88 kilometres (55 mi) of tracks were actually built and most were unusable at the time of the report. Under the Smart Cities Mission, app based cycle sharing schemes have been launched in the city since late 2017. The PMC has devised the Pune Cycle Plan with 470 kilometres (290 mi) of cycle tracks planned. Cycles are also seen as a possible way of improving last mile connectivity for the metro system.

== Education ==
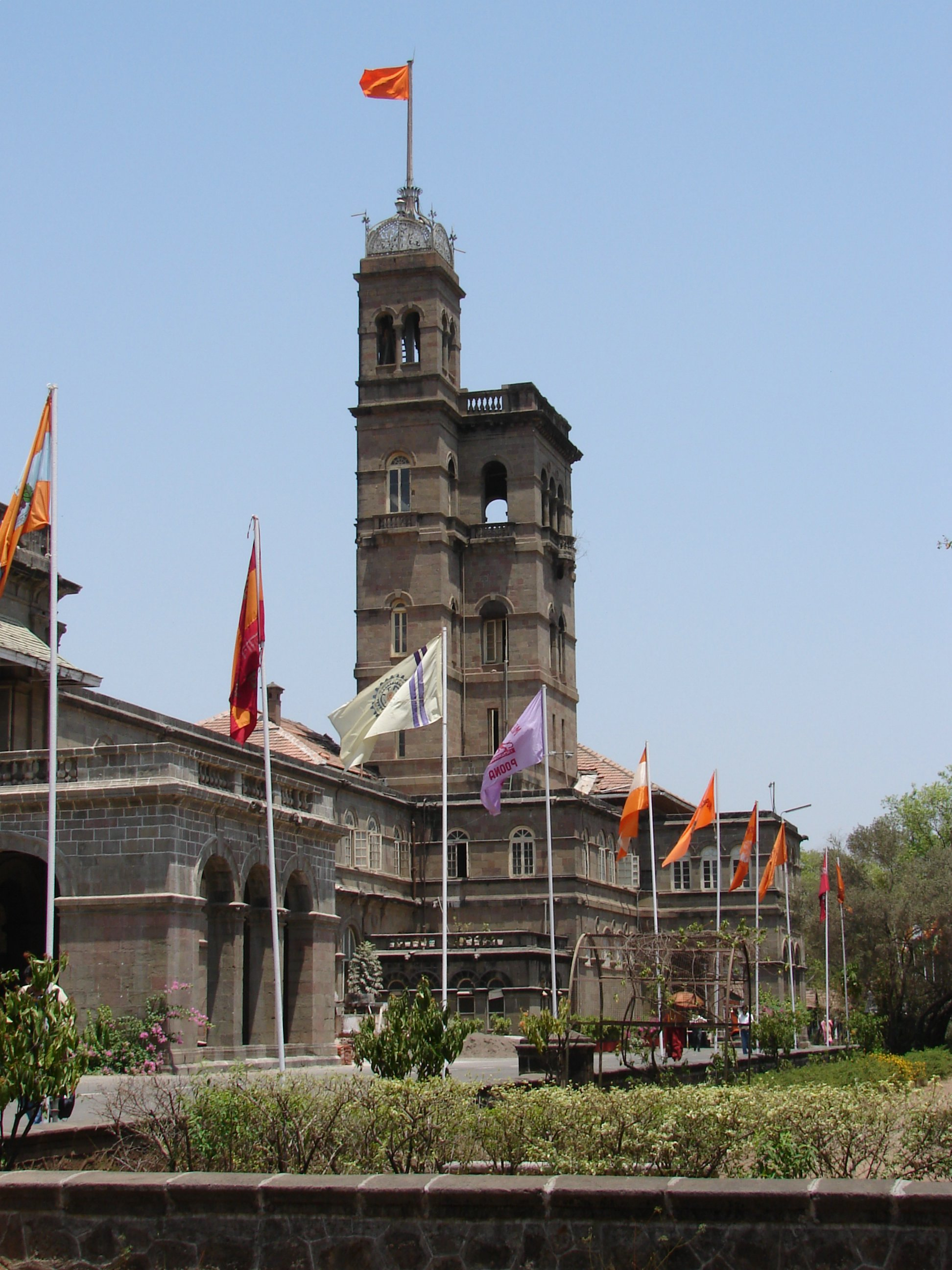
Main building of Pune University

Pune has over a hundred educational institutes and more than nine deemed universities apart from the Savitribai Phule Pune University (SPPU; formerly University of Pune), which is the largest university in the country based on total number of affiliated colleges. Higher education institutes attract international students mainly from the Middle Eastern countries such as Iran, and United Arab Emirates, and also African countries such as Ethiopia and Kenya. Pune is the largest centre for Japanese learning in India. Other languages taught in the city include German, which is taught at the Goethe-Institut, and French, which is taught at Alliance Française. Several colleges in Pune have student exchange programmes with colleges in Europe.

=== Primary and secondary education ===
The PMC runs 297 primary schools and 30 secondary and higher secondary schools. While it is mandatory for the PMC to provide primary education under state law, secondary education is an optional duty. In the rural and suburban areas of the PMR, public primary schools are run by the Pune Zilla Parishad. Private schools are run by education trusts and are required to undergo mandatory inspection by the concerned authorities. Private schools are eligible for financial aid from the state government. Public schools are affiliated to the Maharashtra State Board of Secondary and Higher Secondary Education (State Board). The language of instruction in public schools is primarily Marathi, although the PMC also runs Urdu, English and Kannada medium schools. Along with these languages, private schools also offer instruction in Hindi and Gujarati. Private schools vary in their choice of curriculum and may follow the State Board or one of the two central boards of education, the CBSE or CISCE.

Jnana Prabodhini Prashala, located in Sadashiv Peth, is the first school for intellectually gifted and talented students in India. Additionally, UWC Mahindra College, one of eighteen United World Colleges worldwide and the third is Asia, offering the International Baccalaureate (IB) Diploma Program (DP), is located in the Mulshi valley near Pune.

=== Tertiary education ===
Most colleges in Pune are affiliated to the SPPU (Savitribai Phule Pune University). Nine other universities have also been established in the city. Pune also hosts the Military Intelligence Training School which offers diploma courses in counter intelligence, combat intelligence, aerial imagery and interpretation, among others.

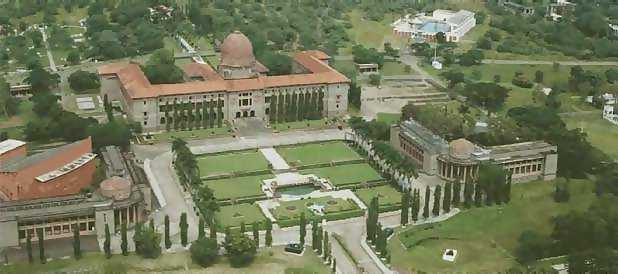
National Defence Academy

The College of Engineering Pune, an autonomous institute of the government of Maharashtra founded in 1854, is the third oldest engineering college in Asia. The Deccan Education Society was founded by local citizens in 1884, including social and political activist Bal Gangadhar Tilak, who was also responsible for founding Fergusson College in 1885. The Indian Law Society's Law College is one of the top ten law schools in India. The Armed Forces Medical College and B. J. Medical College are among the top medical colleges in India. The Armed Forces Medical College consistently ranks among the top five medical colleges in India. The Film and Television Institute of India, one of only three Indian institutions in the global CILECT film school network, is located on Law College Road. The Lalit Kala Kendra is an undergraduate department of Music, Dance and Drama on the SPPU campus that has been operational since 1987. This department features a combination of gurukul and formal education systems. The College of Military Engineering, the Army Institute of Physical Training, and the Institute of Armament Technology are also in Pune. Christ University Pune Lavasa campus, is part of Christ University, Bangalore located in Lavasa.

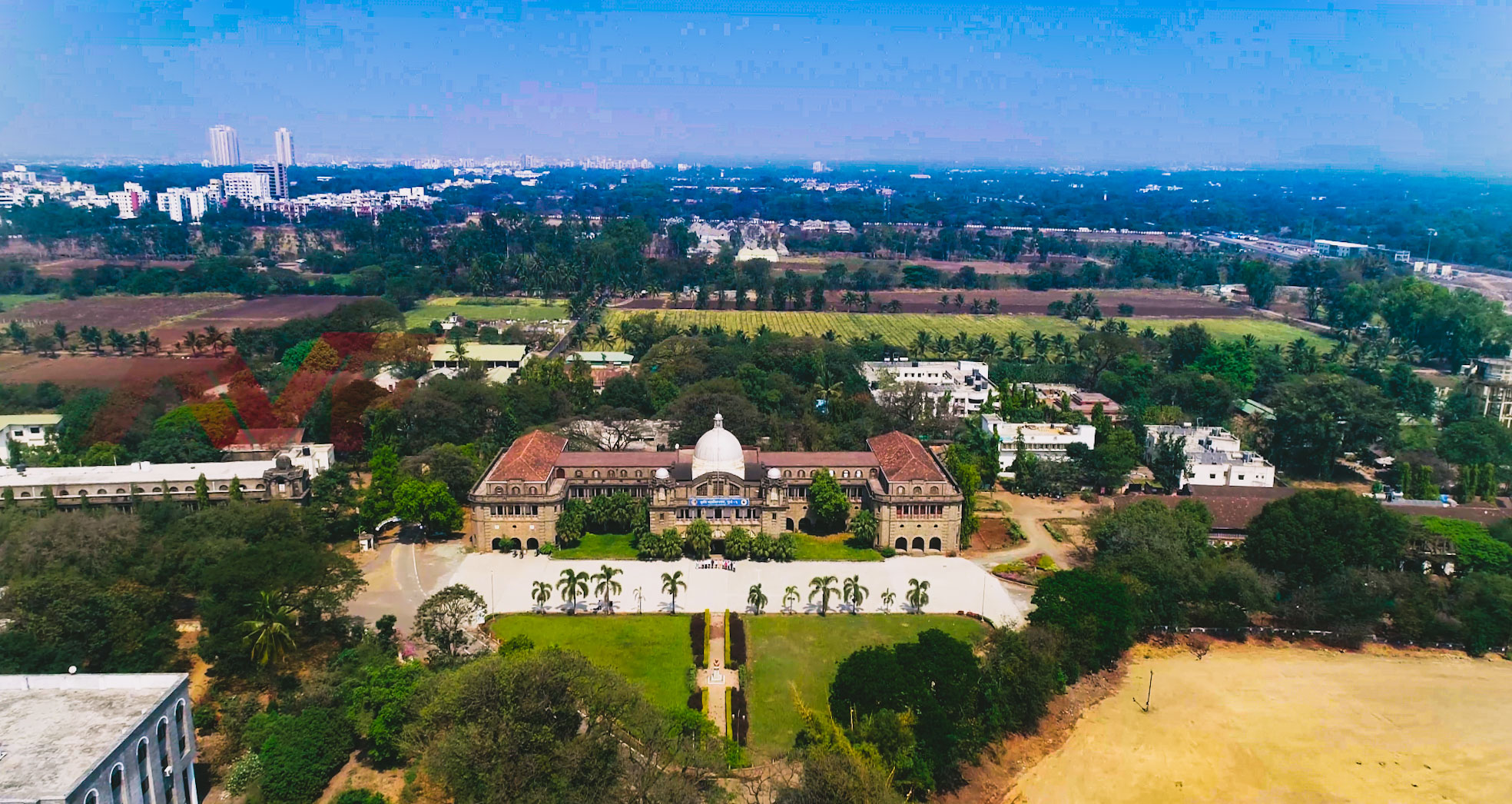
College of Agriculture, Pune

Symbiosis International University operates 33 colleges and institutions in the city, including the Symbiosis Institute of Business Management, the Symbiosis Institute of Management Studies, the Symbiosis Centre for Management and Human Resource Development, the Symbiosis Law School and the Symbiosis Institute of International Business. They are ranked among the top management and law institutes in the country. The Symbiosis Institute of Computer Studies and Research is one of the few colleges in India that promotes open source technology.

=== Research institutes ===
Pune is home to a number of governmental and non-governmental research institutes focusing on a wide range of subject areas from the humanities to the sciences. The Ministry of Defence also runs a number of defence related education, training and research establishments in and around the city. Major research centers include:

- Agharkar Research Institute (ARI)
- Armament Research Development Establishment (ARDE)
- Armed Forces Medical College (India) (AFMC)
- Army Institute of Technology (AIT)
- Automotive Research Association of India (ARAI)
- Bhandarkar Oriental Research Institute (BORI)
- Central Institute of Road Transport (CIRT)
- Central Water and Power Research Station (CW&PRS)
- Centre for Development of Advanced Computing (C-DAC)
- Defence Research and Development Organisation (DRDO)
- Defence Institute of Advanced Technology (DIAT)
- Film and Television Institute of India (FTII)
- Gokhale Institute of Politics and Economics
- High Energy Materials Research Laboratory (HEMRL)
- Indian Institute of Science Education and Research, Pune (IISER, Pune)
- Indian Institute of Tropical Meteorology (IITM)
- Inter-university Centre for Astronomy & Astrophysics (IUCAA)
- National AIDS Research Institute (NARI)
- National Centre for Cell Science (NCCS)
- National Centre for Radio Astrophysics (NCRA)
- National Chemical Laboratory (NCL)
- National Defence Academy (NDA)
- National Informatics Centre (NIC)
- National Institute of Bank Management (NIBM)
- National Institute of Construction Management and Research (NICMAR)
- National Institute of Virology (NIV)
- National School of Leadership (NSL)
- National Insurance Academy (NIA)
- Research & Development Establishment (Engineers) (R&DE(E))
- Tata Research Development and Design Centre (TRDDC)

== Media ==
A number of Marathi-language newspapers from the British era continued publishing decades after independence. These included Kesari, Tarun Bharat, Prabhat and Sakal. Sakal has remained the most popular Marathi daily. Kesari is now only published as an online newspaper. The Mumbai-based Maharashtra Times, Loksatta and Lokmat have all introduced Pune based editions in the last fifteen years. The Mumbai-based popular English newspaper the Indian Express has a Pune edition. Its rival the Times of India introduced a tabloid called Pune Mirror in 2008. Mid-Day, Daily News and Analysis and Sakaal Times are other local English newspapers. The English-language newspaper The Hindu has launched a Pune edition covering local as well as national news. Another English-language online news website Puneri Pages was launched, covering local and national news.

The government owned All India Radio (AIR) has been broadcasting from Pune since 1953. Savitribai Phule Pune University broadcasts programmes focusing on its different departments and student welfare schemes on its own FM radio channel called Vidyavani. A number of commercial FM channels are also received in the city. The city receives almost all of the television channels in India including broadcast, cable and direct-to-home TV.

== Sports ==
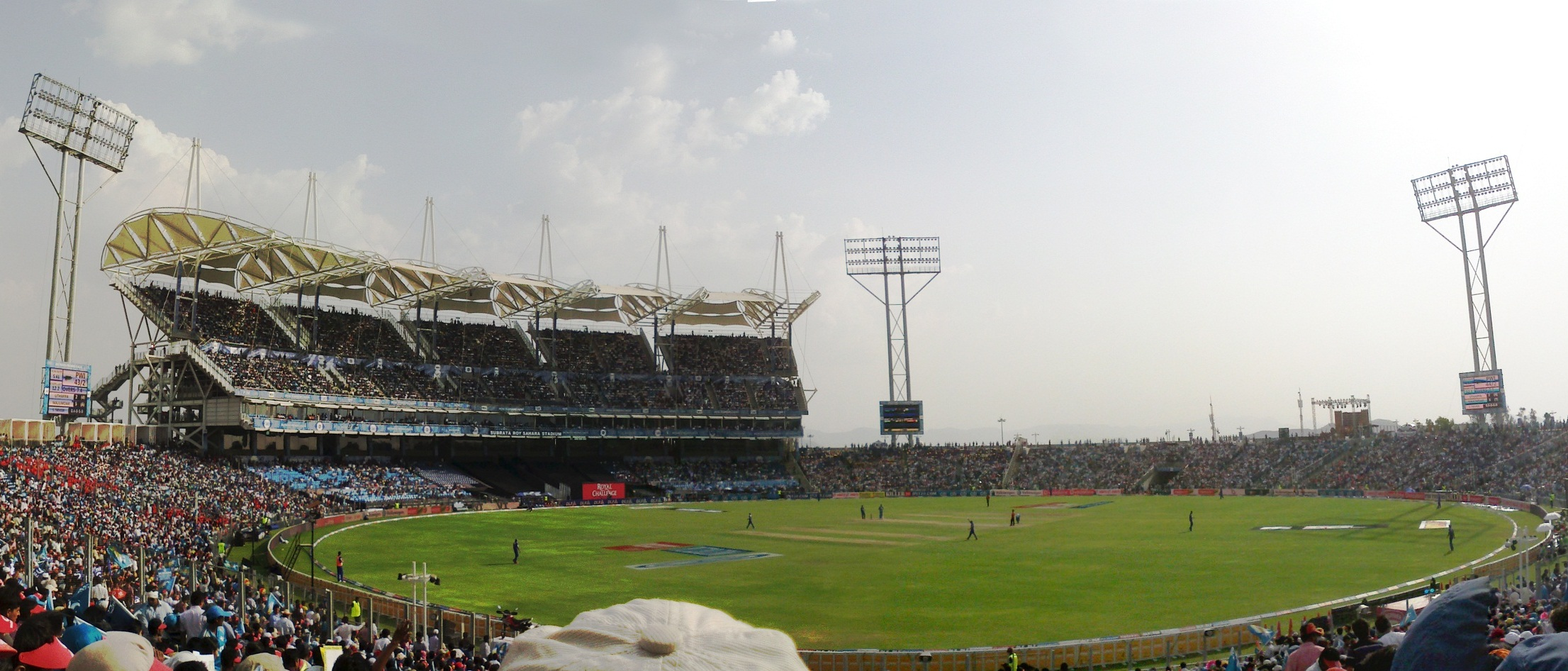
Maharashtra Cricket Association Stadium

Badminton in its modern form originated in Pune. The game of badminton was also known as Poona or Poonah after the then British garrison town of Poona where it was particularly popular and where the first rules for the game were drawn up in 1873. (Games employing shuttlecocks have been played for centuries across Eurasia, but the modern game of badminton developed in the mid-19th century among the British as a variant of the earlier game of battledore and shuttlecock. "Battledore" was an older term for "racquet".)

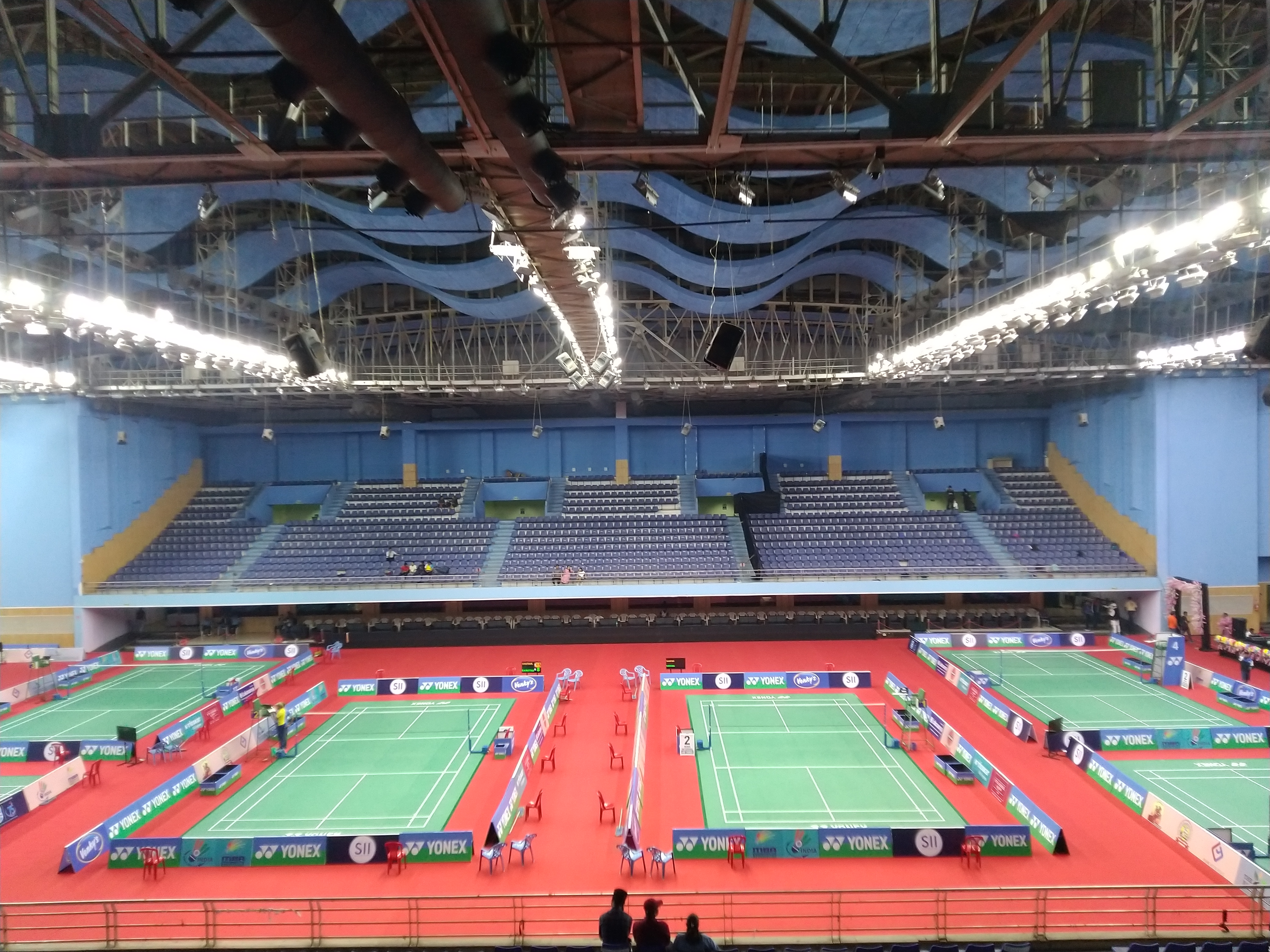
Badminton Arena in Balewadi.

Women's tennis ITF $25K tournament held at Deccan Gymkhana club's tennis courts in 2021. It also hosted men's ITF $15K event. ATP 250 Maharashtra Open was held at Balewadi till 2022. It was India's biggest professional tennis championship and only ATP event of India, where top professional tennis players participated.

Popular games and sports in Pune include cricket, athletics, basketball, badminton, field hockey, football, tennis, kabaddi, paragliding, kho-kho, wrestling, rowing, and chess. The Chhatrapati Shivaji Stadium in Balewadi is the venue for wrestling and other traditional sports. The Royal Connaught Boat Club is one of several boating clubs on the Mula-Mutha river. Pune has basketball courts at the Deccan Gymkhana and at Fergusson College. Pune Skatepark is a skateboarding park built in Sahakarnagar, consisting of an eight-foot bowl in a 3,000 square foot flatground. Other prominent sporting institutions in Pune include the Nehru Stadium, the PYC Hindu Gymkhana, the Poona Golf Club and the Poona Cricket Club. The PYC has a long history of excellence in cricket. It is one of the oldest clubs in India and has produced many great cricketers, including D. B. Deodhar, Vijay Hazare and C. K. Naid.

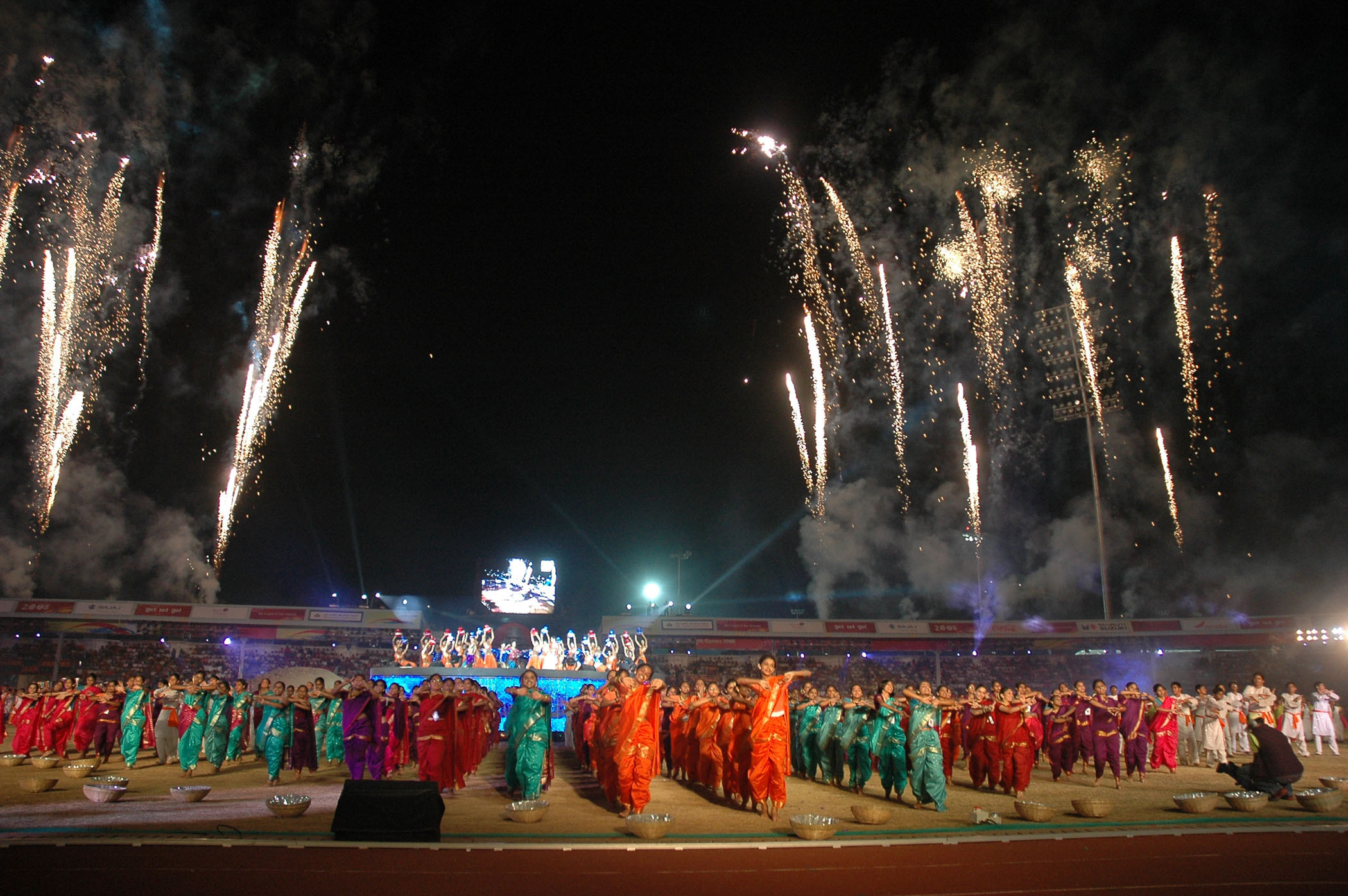
Closing ceremony of the 2008 Commonwealth Youth Games hosted in Pune.

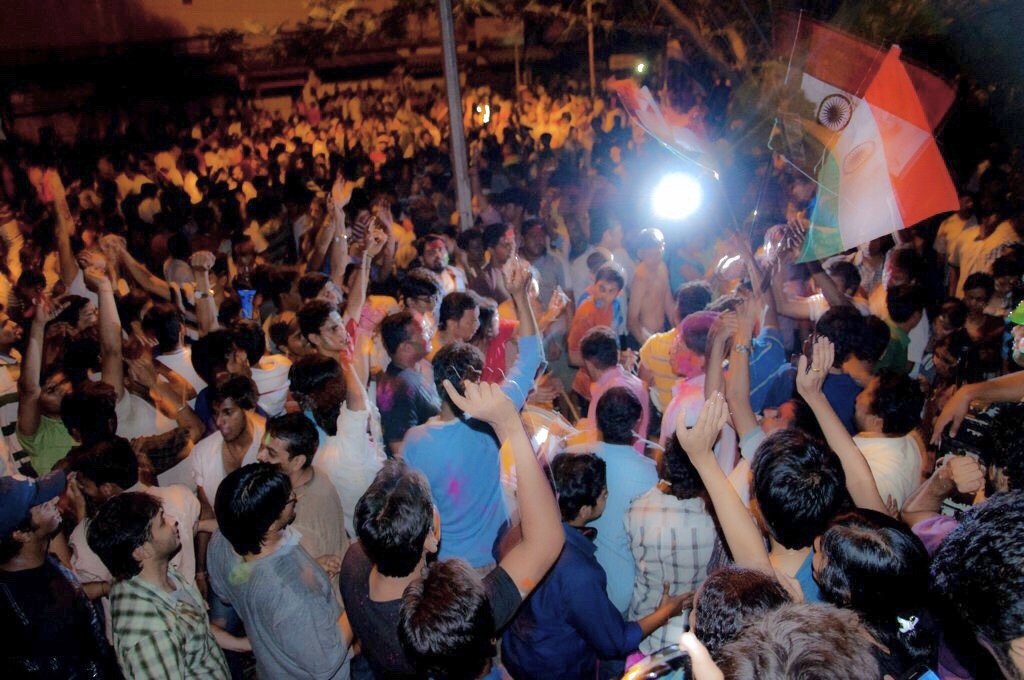
People in Pune celebrating after India won the 2011 Cricket World Cup

The Neharu Stadium has hosted a game of the 1996 Cricket World Cup and five games of the 2023 Cricket World Cup including one of India against Bangladesh.

The Pune International Marathon is an annual marathon conducted in Pune. The National Games of 1994 and the 2008 Commonwealth Youth Games were held in the city at the Balewadi Stadium. The Deccan Gymkhana has hosted Davis Cup matches on several occasions. The 37,000 seating capacity Maharashtra Cricket Association Stadium has hosted international cricket – T20s, One Day Internationals, and a test match. The National Education Foundation organises Enduro3, a cross country adventure race in Pune. It is a two- or three-day event with activities including cycling, trekking, river-crossing and rifle shooting. Pune Race Course was built in 1830 on 118.5 acres (0.480 km^{2}) of land and is managed by the Royal Western India Turf Club. The course has two training tracks and two racing surfaces. The racing season is from July to October and includes the Pune Derby, the RWITC Invitational, the Independence Cup and the Southern Command Cup. The city hosted the 2009 FIVB Men's Junior World Championship.

=== Teams ===
The Maharashtra cricket team and state's women's team owned by Maharashtra Cricket Association represents the state in domestic cricket competitions such as the Ranji, Vijay Hazare Trophy and women's domestic cricket respectively, is based in Pune (headquarter at Gahunje village). Pune Warriors India (2011–2014) and Rising Pune Supergiant (2016–2017) were the two teams based in Pune to play in the Indian Premier League. Poona District Football Association (PDFA) was established in 1972 and currently has more than 100 registered teams. There were two popular football clubs (now defunct) competing in the I-League from the city: Pune FC, and DSK Shivajians FC. FC Pune City was an Indian Super League football club in Pune. Established in 2014, FC Pune City became the only professional football club in India to have teams which participated at all levels of professional football; Senior Team (ISL), U-18 Team (Elite league), U- 16 Team, U-14 Team and the Women's Team. The city is home to the Pune Peshwas, runners-up in the 2015 UBA Pro Basketball League season. Pune also has an American football franchise, called the Pune Marathas, which began playing in the inaugural season of the Elite Football League of India in 2011 and which plays at the Balewadi Stadium.

City-based professional clubs
Club	Sport	League	Stadium	Span
Pune Marathas	American football	EFLI	Deccan Gymkhana Ground	2012–present
Pune FC	Association football	I-League	Shree Shiv Chhatrapati Sports Complex	2007–2016
DSK Shivajians FC	Association football	I-League	Shree Shiv Chhatrapati Sports Complex	1987–2017
Bharat FC	Association football	I-League	Shree Shiv Chhatrapati Sports Complex	2014–2015
FC Pune City	Association football	Indian Super League (ISL)	Shree Shiv Chhatrapati Sports Complex	2014–2019
Pune FC Academy	Association football	Indian Super League (ISL)	Youth League (India)	2011–2016
Pune 7 Aces	Badminton	Premier Badminton League	Shree Shiv Chhatrapati Sports Complex	2016–present
Pune Pistons	Badminton	Indian Badminton League	Shree Shiv Chhatrapati Sports Complex	2016–present
Pune Peshwas	Basketball	UBA	Deccan Gymkhana Ground	2015–present
Maharashtra cricket team	Cricket	Ranji Trophy	Maharashtra Cricket Association Stadium	1934–present
Pune Warriors India	Cricket	Indian Premier League (IPL)	Maharashtra Cricket Association Stadium	2011–2014
Rising Pune Supergiant	Cricket	Indian Premier League (IPL)	Maharashtra Cricket Association Stadium	2016–2017
Puneri Bappa	Cricket	Maharashtra Premier League (MPL)	Maharashtra Cricket Association Stadium	2023–present
Veer Marathi	Cricket	Celebrity Cricket League (CCL)	Maharashtra Cricket Association Stadium	2013–2015
Maratha Warriors	Hockey	Premier Hockey League (PHL)	Mahindra Hockey Stadium	2005–2008
Puneri Paltan	Kabaddi	Pro Kabaddi League	Shree Shiv Chhatrapati Sports Complex	2014–present
Pune Marathas	Tennis	Champions Tennis League	Shree Shiv Chhatrapati Sports Complex	2014–2015

== International relations ==
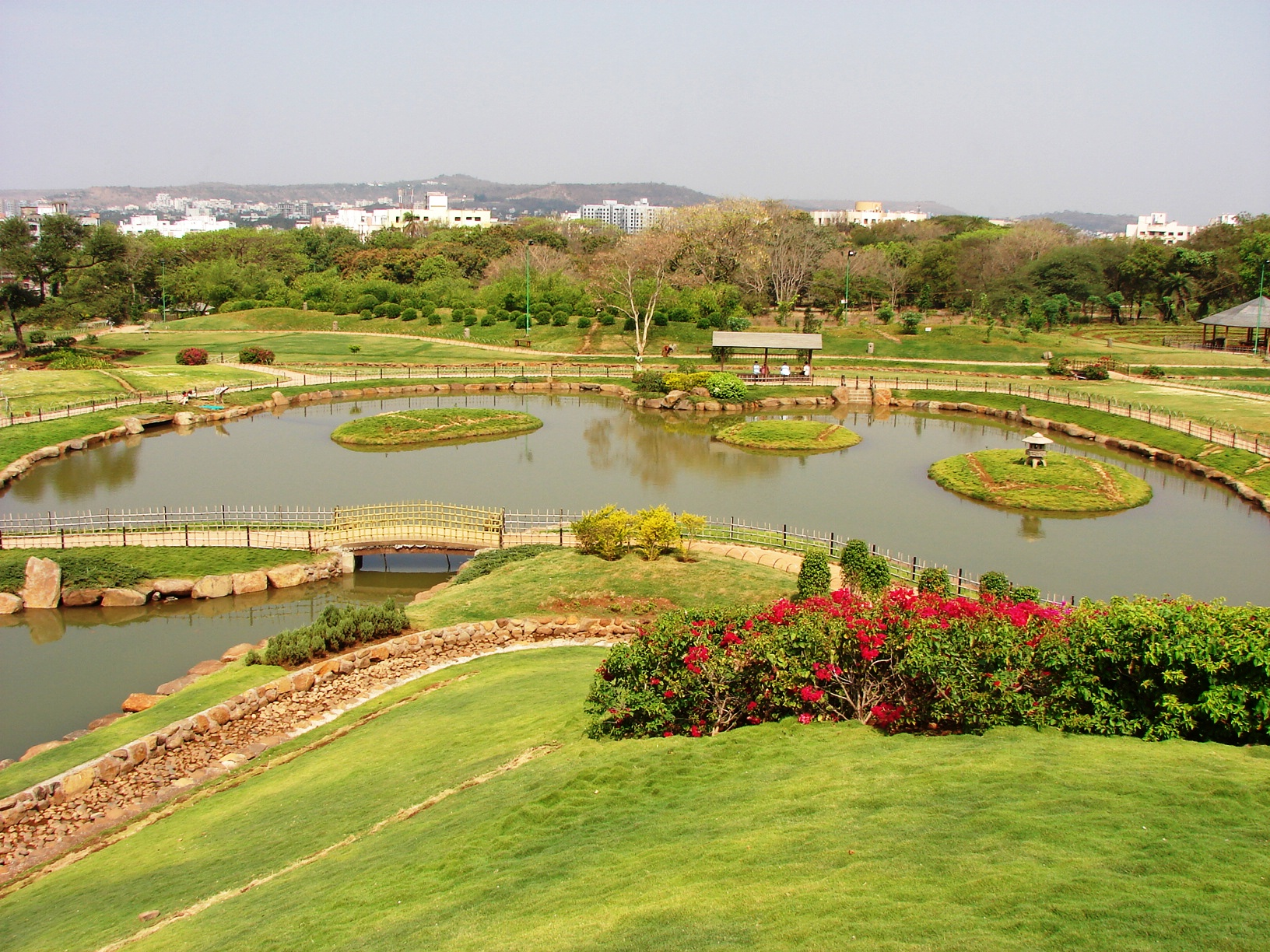
Pune-Okayama Friendship Garden

Twin towns and sister cities

- San Jose, California, United States (1992)
- Vacoas-Phoenix, Mauritius
- Austin, Texas, United States – since 2018
- Fairbanks, Alaska, United States
- Matteson, Illinois, United States
- Kawasaki, Japan
- Tromsø, Norway

Informal relationship

- Bremen, Germany
- Okayama, Japan

== See also ==
- List of tallest buildings in Pune
- List of people from Pune
  - Poonawalla
