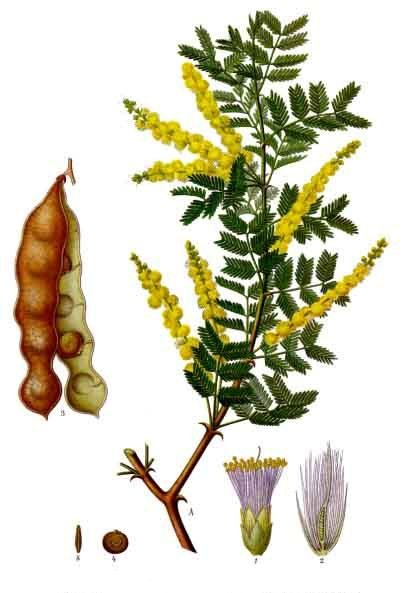

Scientific classification
- Kingdom: Plantae
- Clade: Tracheophytes
- Clade: Angiosperms
- Clade: Eudicots
- Clade: Rosids
- Order: Fabales
- Family: Fabaceae
- Subfamily: Caesalpinioideae
- Clade: Mimosoid clade
- Genus: Senegalia
- Species: S. senegal

Binomial name
- Senegalia senegal (L.) Britton

Synonyms
- Acacia circummarginata Chiov.; Acacia cufodontii Chiov.; Acacia glaucophylla sensu Brenan; Acacia kinionge sensu Brenan; Acacia oxyosprion Chiov.; Acacia rupestris Boiss.; Acacia senegal (L.) Willd.; Acacia senegal subsp. modesta (Wall.) Roberty; Acacia senegal subsp. senegalensis Roberty; Acacia somalensis sensu Brenan; Acacia sp. 1 F. White; Acacia spinosa Marloth & Engl.; Acacia thomasii sensu Brenan; Acacia volkii Suess.; Mimosa senegal L.

= Senegalia senegal =

Species of deciduous tree

Senegalia senegal (also known as Acacia senegal) is a small thorny deciduous tree from the genus Senegalia, which is known by several common names, including gum acacia, gum arabic tree, Sudan gum and Sudan gum arabic. In parts of India, it is known as kher, khor, or kumatiya. It is native to semi-desert regions of Sub-Saharan Africa, as well as Oman, Pakistan, and west coastal India. It grows to a height of 5–12 metres (16-40'), with a trunk up to 30 cm (1') in diameter. Sudan is the source of the world's highest quality gum arabic, known locally as hashab gum in contrast to the related, but inferior, gum arabic from red acacia, known as talah gum.

== Uses ==
=== Gum arabic ===
The tree is of great economic importance for the gum arabic it produces which is used as a food additive, in crafts, and as a cosmetic. The gum is drained from cuts in the bark, and an individual tree will yield 200 to 300 grams (7 to 10 oz). Eighty percent of the world's gum arabic is produced in Sudan. The Chauhatan area of Barmer district in Rajasthan is also famous for gum production, this is called कुम्मट (Kummat) in local language there.

=== Forage ===
New foliage is very useful as forage. Leaves and pods of S. senegal are browsed by domestic and wild ruminants.

=== Agriculture ===
Like other legume species, S. senegal fixes nitrogen within Rhizobia or nitrogen-fixing bacteria living in root nodules. This nitrogen fixation enriches the poor soils where it is grown, allowing for the rotation of other crops in naturally nutrient-poor regions.

=== Traditional uses ===
It has been reportedly used for its astringent properties, to treat bleeding, bronchitis, cough, diarrhea, dysentery, catarrh, gonorrhea, leprosy, typhoid fever and upper respiratory tract infections.

=== Rope ===
Roots near the surface of the ground are quite useful in making all kinds of very strong ropes and cords. The tree bark is also used to make rope.

=== Wood ===
The wood of S. senegal can be used to make handles for tools, and parts for weaving looms. It is also valued as firewood and can be used to produce charcoal.

=== Chemistry ===
S. senegal contains hentriacontane, a solid, long-chain alkane hydrocarbon. The leaf also contains the psychoactive alkaloid dimethyltryptamine.

Senegalia senegal
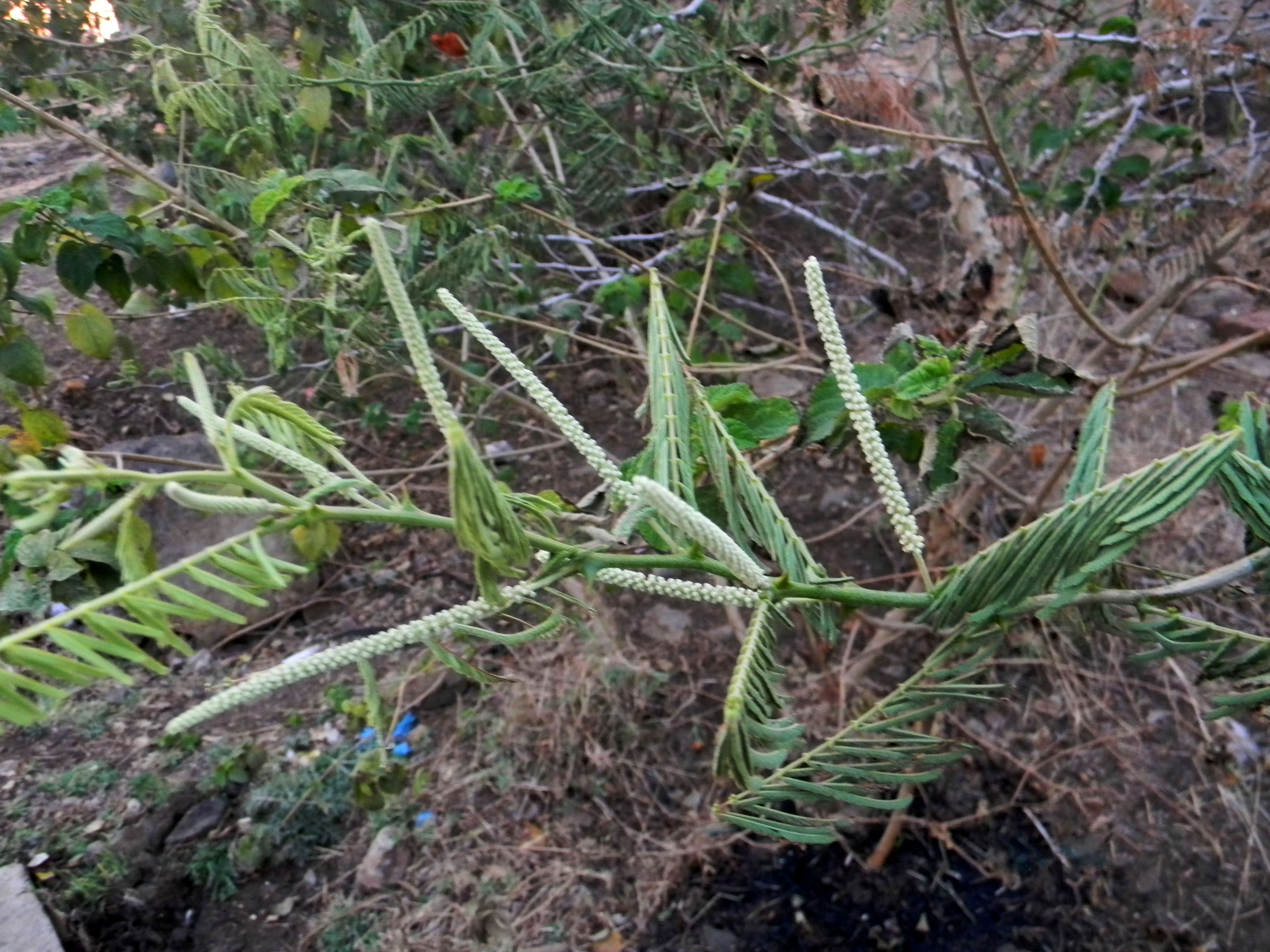
A Gum acacia tree photographed at Taljai Hills, Pune

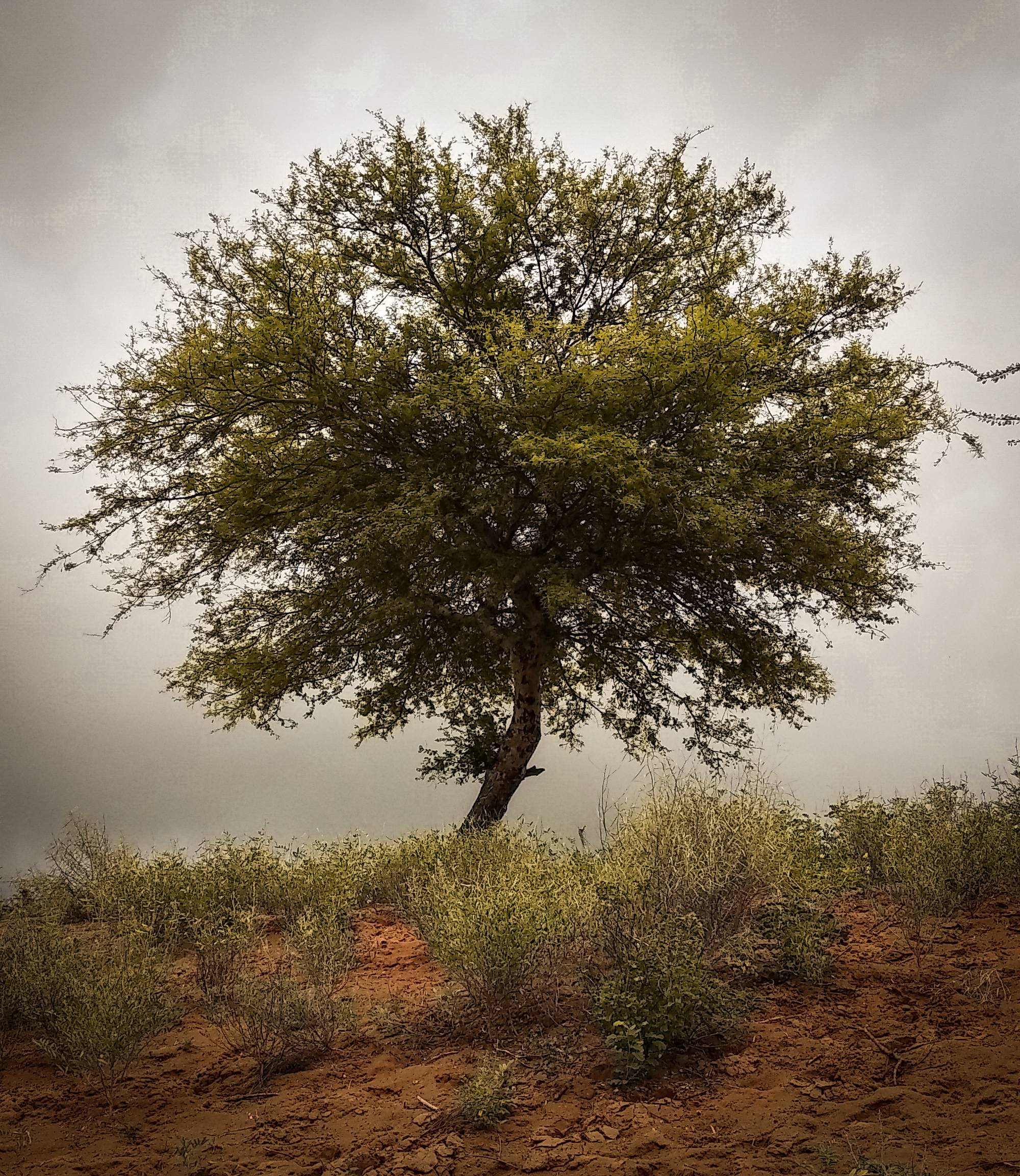
Senegalia Senegal (Kummat) tree in Jodhpur, Thadiya village

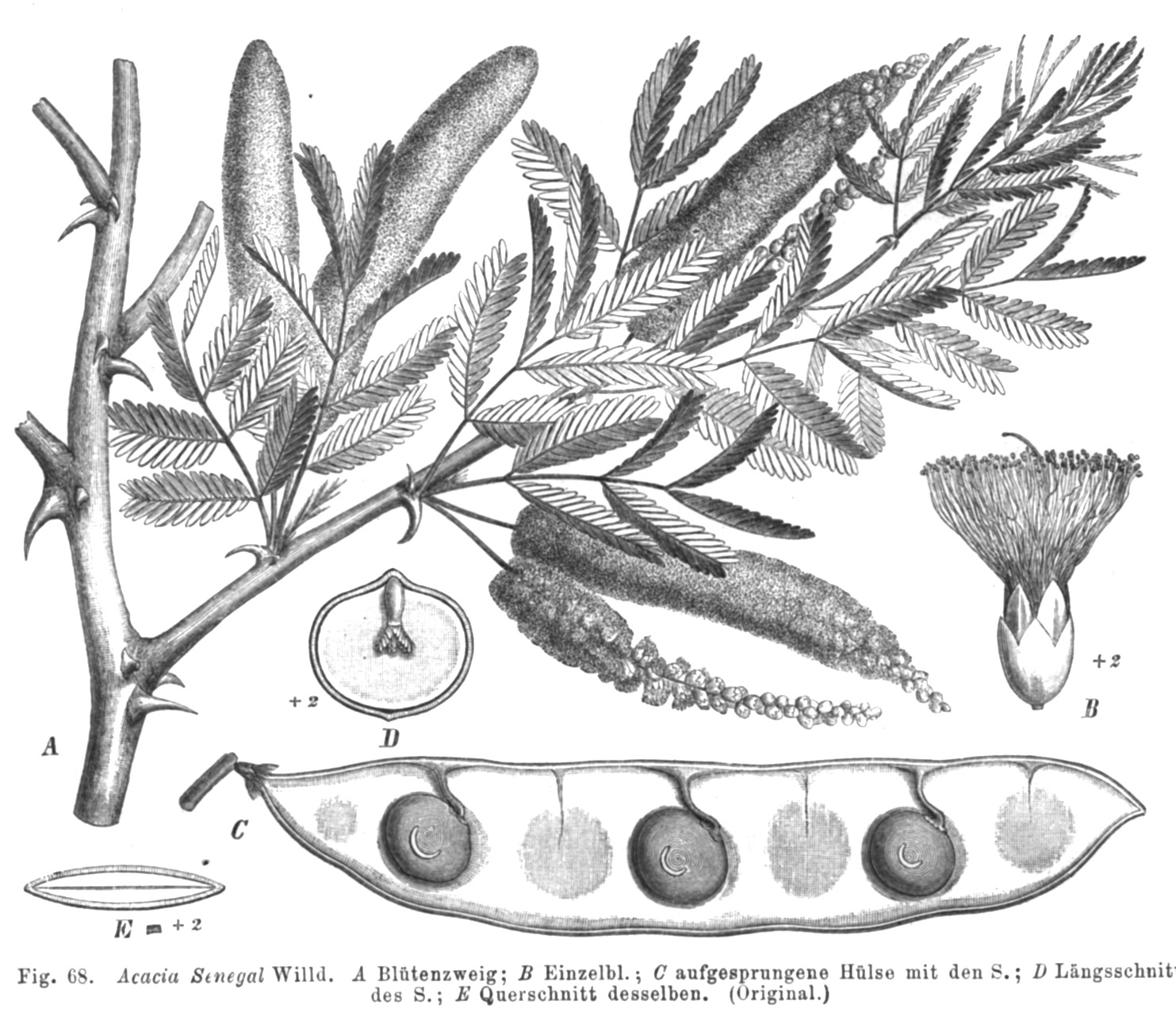
Senegalia senegal

== See also ==
- List of Acacia species known to contain psychoactive alkaloids
- List of psychoactive plants
