= Mangalwar Peth =

Mangalwar Peth is an old neighbourhood in the Pune Central of city of Pune. It was settled in 1662 when Mughal Subahdar Shaista Khan came to Pune to defeat Shivaji. At the time this area was known as Astapura. This Peth is bordered by Kasba Peth and Somwar Peth and also New Mangalwar Peth, Mali. Mangalwar Peth is located between Nagzari Odha and Manik Odha. Areas of the Peth suffered severe damage during the Panshet dam floods of 1961. The Kamla Nehru hospital are located in this area along with Atal Bihari Vajpayee Medical College of Pune Municipal Corporation. Mangalwar Peth is also famous for the Gogawale Swami Samarth Math Pune at House No- 49, Mangalwar Peth, Baburaoji Sonawane Path, Pune-411011

Mangalwar Peth, Pune, Maharashtra 411011

Borders at East- Manik Odha & New Mangalwar Peth & Mali, West- Nagzari Odha & Kasba Peth, North- Manik Odha & New Mangalwar Peth & Mali, South- Somwar Peth.

Body- Pune Municipal Corporation.

Ward Office- Bhavani Peth Kshetriya Karyalaya.

Assembly Constituency- Pune Cantonment Assembly Constituency 214

Parliamentary Constituency- Pune Lok Sabha Constituency.

Pincode- 411011

Post Office- Mangalwar Peth.

Major Landmarks- Kamla Nehru Hospital, Atal Bihari Vajpayee Medical College, Baburao Sanas School, Gogawale Swami Samarth Math, Parge Chowk, Prabodankar Thakre Chowk, Todkar Hospital.

Major Roads- Baburaoji Sonawane Path, TH Jawale Path, Kamal Nehru Hospital Road, Part of Barane Road.

Bridges/Pool on Nagzari odha- Kagdi Pool, Siddheshwar Pool connecting Kasba Peth.

Bridges/Pool on Manik Odha- Bhim Nagar Pool, Barane Road Pool, Sadanand Nagar Pool Connecting New Mangalwar Peth & Mali.
