= Nana Peth, Pune =

Area in Pune, Maharashtra, India

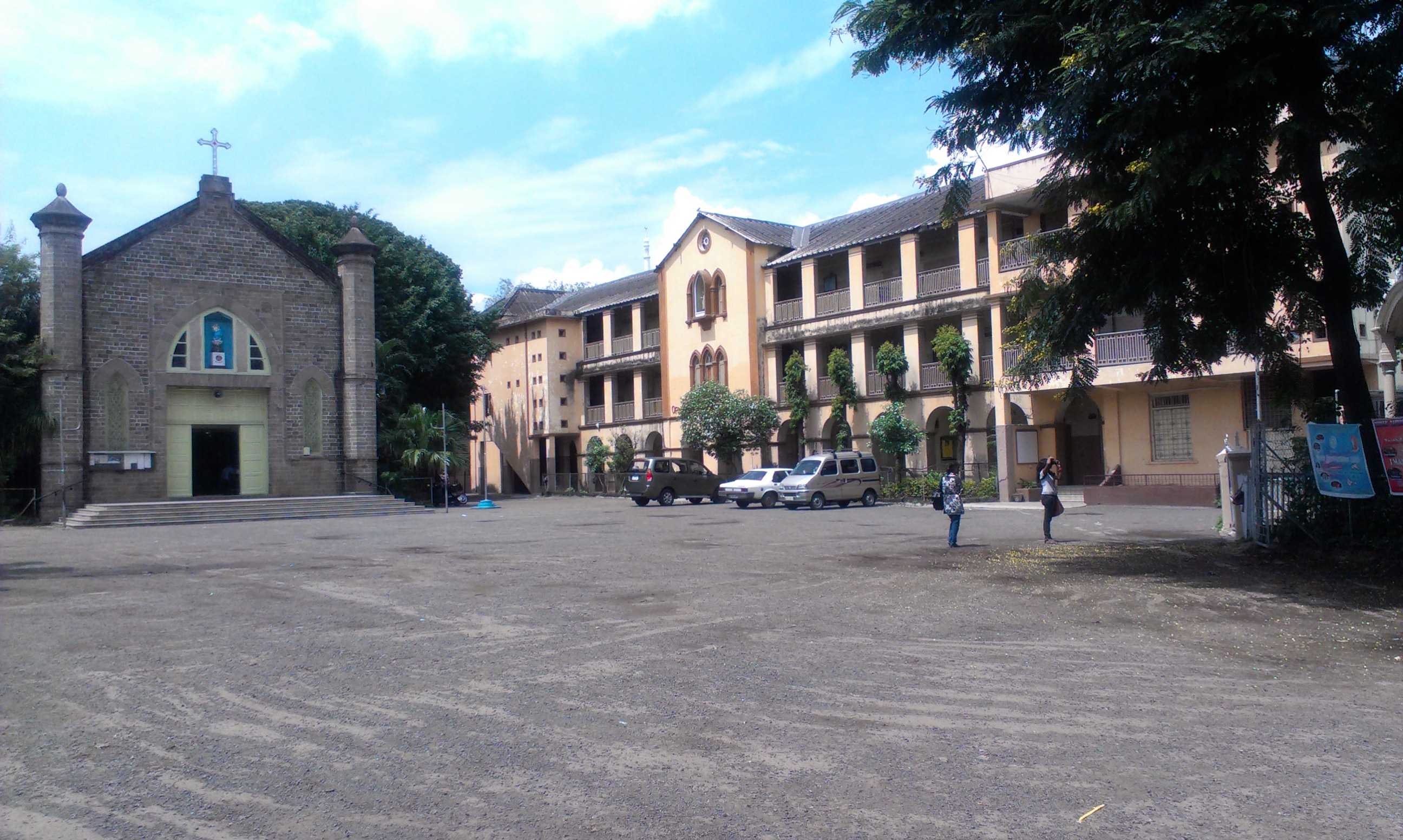
Ornellas High School At 433, Swami Bodhraj Road, Quarter Gate Chowk, Nana Peth, Pune-411 011

Nana Peth is an old neighbourhood in the Pune Central of City of Pune. The name is derived from the name of Nana Phadanvis. The Peth is bordered by Rasta Peth, Bhavani Peth, Ganesh Peth, and Saddar Bazar (Old Modikhana) Pune Camp. Nana Peth is located between Nagzari Odha and Manik Odha.

The Nana Peth is famous for its multi cultural & multi religion identity as this Peth is residence for many people from different religion and culture, Religions such as Zoroastrians, Muslims, Hindus, Christians, Jews and Cultures Such as Irani/Persian, Pastuni, Arabian, Sindhi, Balochi, Marathi, Gujarati, Punjabi, Rajasthani, Kashmiri.

Nana Peth is known for automobile spare parts shops and second hand vehicle market, along with many wholesale shops. there are also famous religious places such as Sardar Sorabji Ratanji Patel Agiyari, Nivdungya Vithoba Mandir, Manu shah Masjid, Pensionwala Masjid, Chand tara Masjid, Dakshinmukhi Maruti Mandir, Achanak Maruti Mandir, Ganjicha Maruti.

Beautiful Antique Bungalows and heritage houses of Padamjee Park, Ma Parvez Road, Ardeshir Irani Path, RS Kudale Road, Irvin Road, Pandita Ramabai Road, Tej Parwani Road takes Nana Peth towards a colonial era. The main attraction of Ardeshir Baug of Poona Parsi Panchayat is the Fisher's GYM. The People of residing in Nana Peth are demonym as Nana Pethi.

Nana Peth, Pune, Maharashtra 411002/411011

Borders- At East- Manik Odha and Pune Camp, At West- Nagzari Odha and Ganesh Peth, At North- Rasta Peth, At South- Bhavani Peth.

Body- Pune Municipal Corporation.

Ward Office- Bhavani Peth Kshetriya Karyalaya.

Assembly Constituency- Pune Cantonment Assembly Constituency 214

Parliamentary Constituency- Pune Lok Sabha Constituency.

Pin code- 411002/411011

Post Office- Nana Peth

Major Landmarks- Kadar Bhai Chowk, Quarter Gate Chowk, Saint Kabir Chowk, Ashok Chowk, Aruna Chowk, Nana Chawdi Chowk, Hind Mata Chowk, Pimpri Chowk, SD Camp Chowk, AD Camp Chowk, 1009 Gadi Adda, Shiv shakti Chowk, Padamjee Park, Nishant Talkies.

Major Schools- Ornelas High School, Shantabai Ladkat E-Learning School, City World School, Ambedkar College.

Major Hospitals- Hope Hospital, Kirad Hospital, Matruseva Hospital, Mamasaheb Badade Dawakhana 558 Nana Peth Pune.

Major Roads- Laxmi Road, Swami Bodhraj Road, Pandita Ramabai Road, Irvin Road, RS Kudale Road, Ardeshir Irani Path, Ma Parvez Road, Padamjee Park Lane No-1 Dilema Path, Padamjee Park Lane No-2 Pamnani Path, Padamjee Park Lane No-3 Dada Chelaram Path, Nityananda Road, Dr.Choitram Path, Tej Parwani Road, Waghmare Guruji Path, BKT Bhosale Marg, Jawaharlal Nehru Road, Timber Market Road, Vaidyanath Nanal Shashtri Marg, Mamasaheb Badade Road, Vithalrao Kangle Road, Raghunath Dinaji Pawar Path, Dokey Maruti Marg, Vasantrao Babulal Bhandari Road, Padmashali Bhavanarushi Path, Narayan SB Marg, Pahilwan Pratap Singh Pardeshi Path.

Bridges/Pul on Nagzari Odha- (1) Laxmi Road Pul, (2) Ashok Chowk Pul.

Bridges/Pul on Manik Odha- (1) Sachwani Pul (Sachapir Dargah Pul), (2) Parsi Pul (Ardeshir Baug Pul), (3) Gulrukh Pul (Gadi Adda Pul)
