= Bhosari =

- Neighborhood
- Location in Maharashtra, India
- Coordinates: 18°33′37.5″N 73°50′09.69″E
- Country: India
- State: Maharashtra
- District: Pune
- City: Pimpri-Chinchwad

Area
  - Total: 20.16 km^{2} (7.78 sq mi)
- Elevation: 585 m (1,919 ft)

Population (2020)
  - Total: 256,316
  - Density: 12,710/km^{2} (32,930/sq mi)
- Demonym: Bhosarikar

Languages
  - Official: Marathi
- Time zone: UTC+5:30 (IST)
- 40192PIN: 411039
- Area code: 91-20-XXXX-XXXX
- Vehicle registration: MH 14
- City: Pune

Bhosari (IAST: Bhosarī), historically known as Bhojapur, is a neighborhood in the city of Pimpri-Chinchwad, India. It is well known for its cultural and sports activities like Wrestling and Kabaddi.

The area is also recognized as one of the oldest settlements in Pimpri-Chinchwad, with archaeological findings indicating its historical significance. Today, Bhosari has developed into a major industrial hub, housing the Maharashtra Industrial Development Corporation (MIDC) area that supports numerous small, medium, and large-scale industries.

== History ==
Bhosari village has a history dating to Gautam Buddha's era. It is said to have been under the rule of Bhoja tribe during the late Vedic Age. It is said that king Bhoja established a capital here and named it Bhojapura (lit. city of Bhoja).

Bhosari was called Bheusari (Sanskrit: भेऊसरी) during the Rashtrakuta rule in the 8th century. A land grant copperplate inscription dated 758 CE describes Krishna I gifting the village of Bopkhelugram (present day Bopkhel) to Pugadibhatta, mentioning Bheusari to the north of the village.

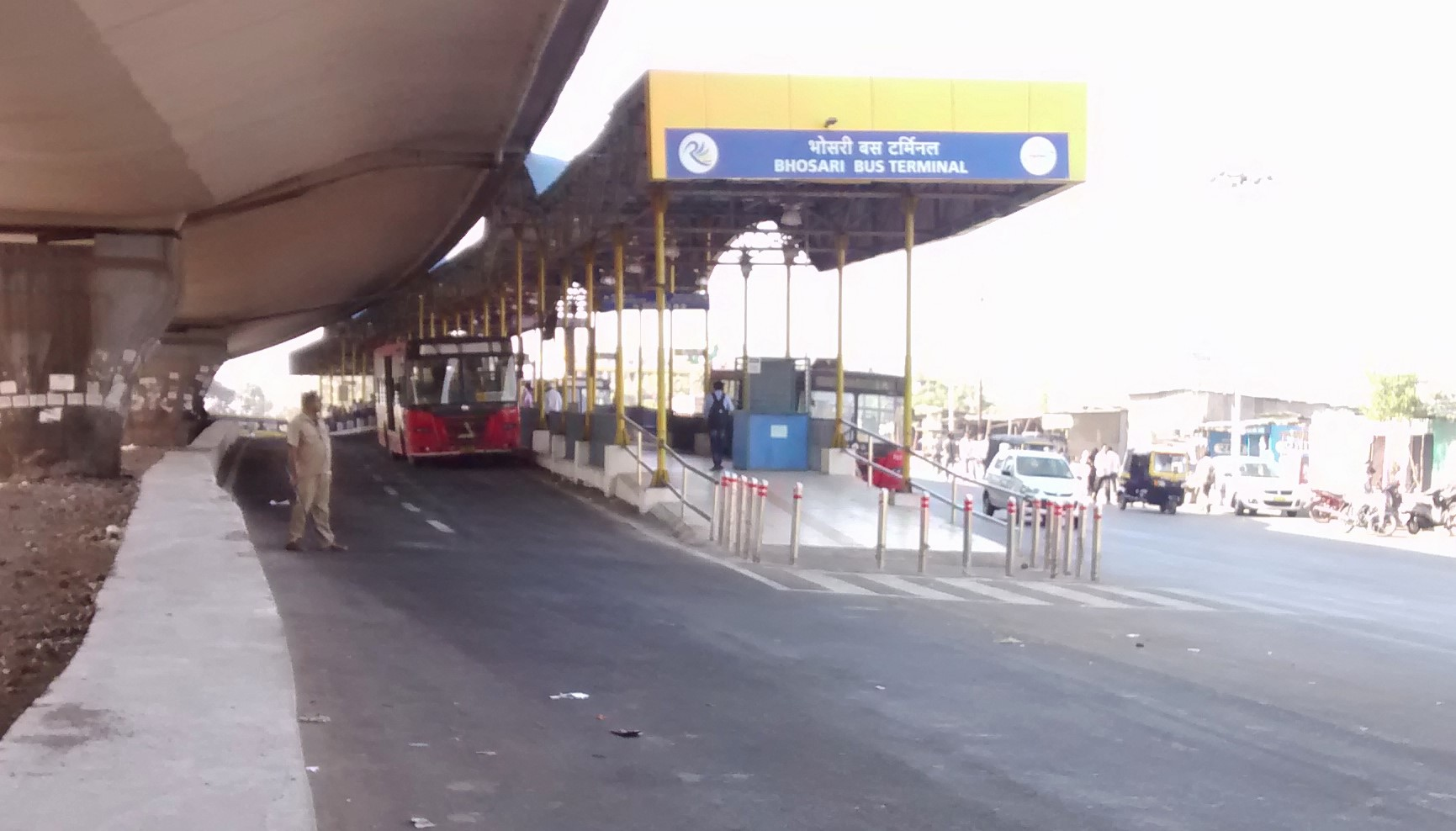
Bhosari PMPML Bus Stop

Bhosari Maharashtra Industrial Development Corporation is the largest industrial area in this region containing big companies like Tata Motors, Philips, Thermax, and Century Enka.

The Marutrao Landge International Wrestling Training Center opened in Bhosari in 2023.

== Geography and Climate ==
Bhosari is situated at a height of 530 meters (1,740 ft) above sea level. Similar to Pimpri-Chinchwad, Bhosari has a tropical wet and dry (Köppen Aw) climate, closely bordering upon a hot semi-arid climate (Köppen BSh).

Bhosari is located about 10 km (6.2 mi) east of Pimpri-Chinchwad city center, and is traversed by National Highway 60 connecting Pune to Dhule via Nashik.
