= Yerwada Mental Hospital =

- Government of India

Geography
- Location: R N G Road, Vishrantwadi, Phulenagar, Near RTO Office, Yerawada, Pune 411006, Maharashtra, India
- Coordinates: 18°33′54″N 73°52′46″E

Organisation
- Care system: Public

Services
- Beds: 1,590

Links
- Lists: Hospitals in India
- Other links: Mental Healthcare in India

Regional Mental Hospital (also known as Yerwada Mental Hospital) is a psychiatric hospital located in the Indian state of Maharashtra. It is one of the largest mental hospitals in Asia.

== Controversy and criticisms ==
=== Bribery by official ===
In December 2004, Times of India reported that a psychiatrist working for Yerwada Mental Hospital had bribed a person associated with the Director General of Police. It was alleged that Govind Vaidya issued fitness certificates for bribes. This was captured by an undercover operation held in July 2000. To stall the investigation, he then bribed an official Rs. 30,000 (500 US$). The raid by the police department into his house resulted in the seizure of Rs. 274,000 (4500 $US).

=== Poor condition and quality of care ===
The quality of care offered by the hospital is poor. The compound has a 100-year-old drainage system and has erratic water supply. This led to some defecating patients to wipe with their clothes. The quality of uniform worn by the patients are also poor.

=== Alleged rape by staff ===
In October 2013, it was reported that a female patient who had been involuntarily committed into the institution was raped by hospital staff. Four individuals were arrested. The director of the hospital refuted the allegations. The patient was taken into care by a non-governmental organization shortly after she filed the complaint.

=== Mental illness among long-term staff ===
In October 2013, Daily News & Analysis reported that some staff who worked at the hospital for a long period developed mental illness such as schizophrenia and psychosis. These individuals were kept under the care of the hospital psychiatrists. A representative from the hospital also stated that monthly check-ups were being conducted to prevent the occurrence of mental illness among staff members. An independent psychiatrist commented that the demand to show empathy to their patients can result in burnout within a couple of years. This was bad in the name of hospital, even though it is one of the largest hospital in Asia .

== See also ==
- Pune
- List of hospitals in India
- Healthcare in India
