= Taljai Hills =

Hill in Pune, Maharashtra

Taljai
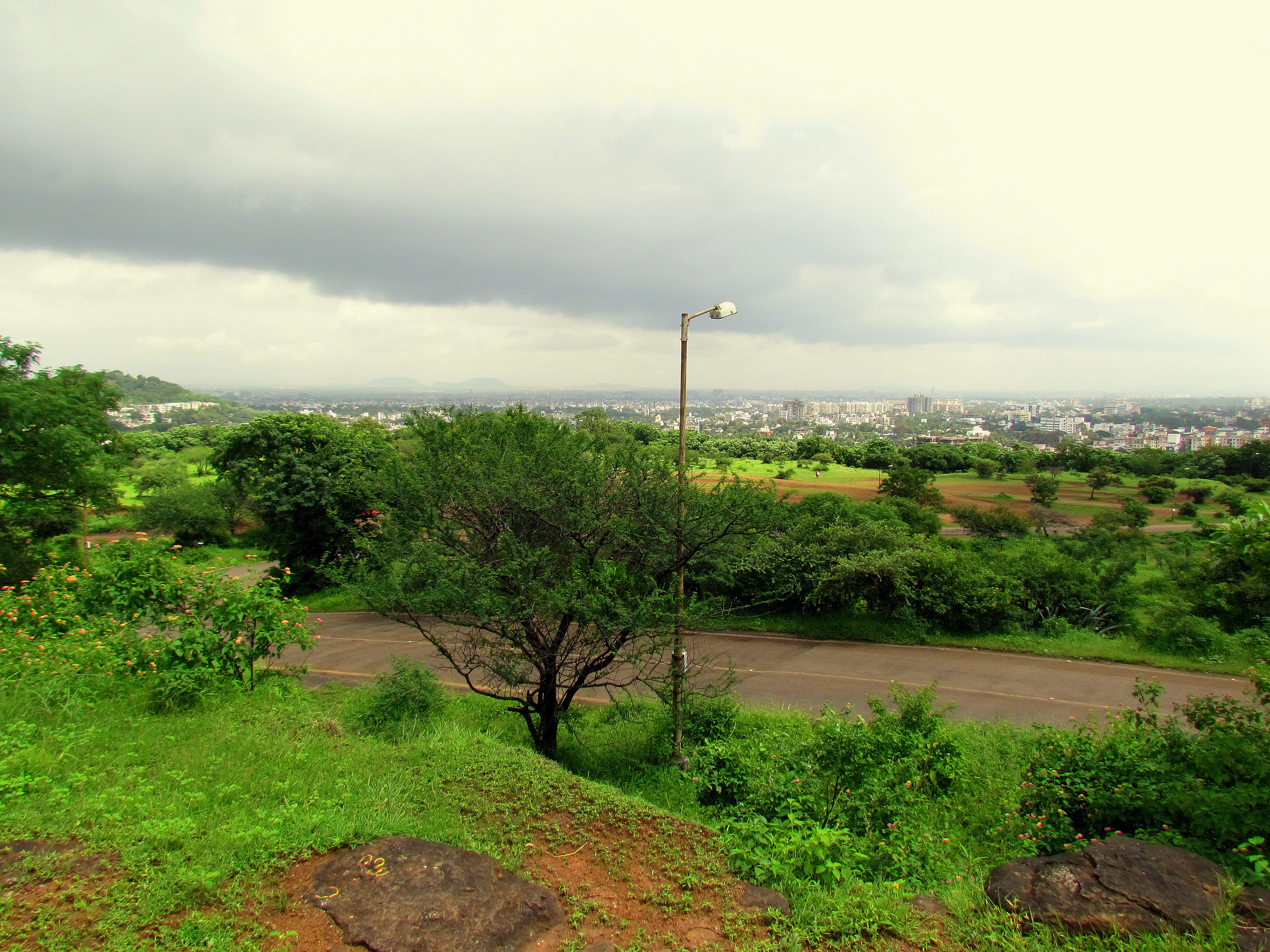
- View of Pune taken from the top of the hill of Taljai

Highest point
- Elevation: 2,000 ft (610 m)
- Coordinates: 18.4754554°N 73.8279674°E

Geography
- Location within Maharashtra
- Location: Pune, Maharashtra, India
- Parent range: Western Ghats

Climbing
- Easiest route: Through the Shivaji Maratha College campus

Taljai is a hill located in the heart of Pune, India that has been designated as a wildlife reserve. The road to this hill passes through the Shivaji Maratha College campus with a picturesque mountain path, with sharp turns. Near the entrance of the forest is a temple to the hill's namesake Taljai mata; a Hindu goddess.

The reserve attracts migratory birds and is home to peacocks. The location is therefore popular with amateur bird watchers and ornithologists. A recent study concluded that the lake at Taljai is dying due to dumping of plastic waste, facing issues to maintain its original form due to urbanization. Several organisations are running campaigns to raise the issue. The park is open for visitors from 5:00 to10:00 in the mornings and from 4:30 to 7:00 in the evenings. Vehicles are prohibited in the area.
