= Kasba Peth, Pune =

Neighbourhood in Pune, India

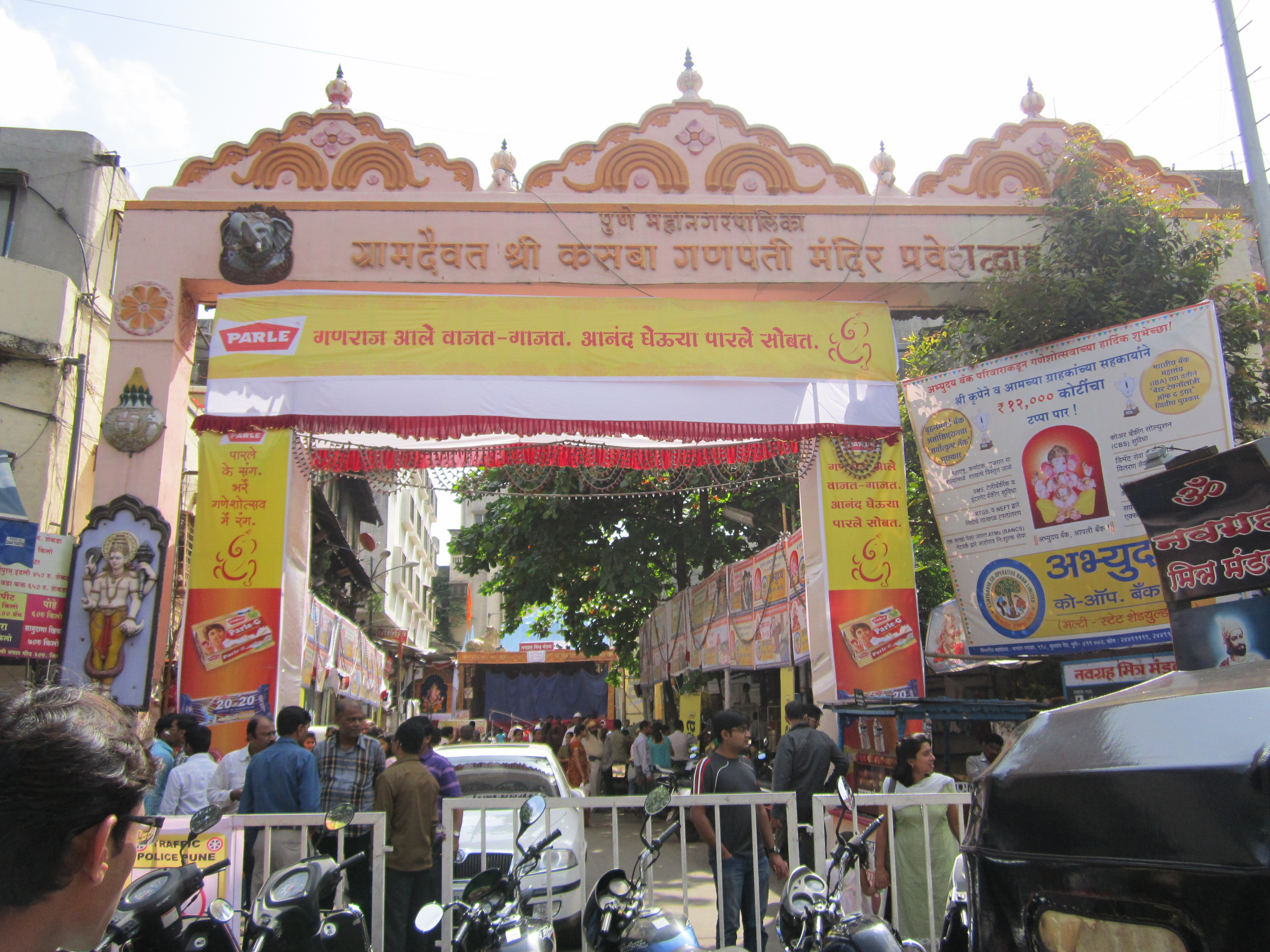
Entrance to Kasba Ganpati temple

Kasba Peth is the oldest peth or area in Pune, India. It is adjacent to the historic Shaniwar Wada palace-fort. Kasba Peth was the first Peth to be established sometime during the 5th century. It is called the "Heart of Pune City". In the history of Pune, the city was once known as "Kasbe Pune".

Kasba Ganapati is the Gram Devta of Pune. It was built during Shivaji's reign. Lal Mahal, the fortified residence of Shivaji, was situated in Kasba Peth. Today, its replica can be seen adjacent to Shaniwarwada. Being the oldest part of the City, old residential complexes, "Wada (house)", exist here. Shitole wada, Mujumdar Wada and many other historic wada's are located here. Kasba Peth is primarily a residential area. A wide variety of shops surround Kasba Peth (Tambat Ali, Shimpi Ali, Vyavahar Ali, Bhoi Ali, etc.). It is well known for the Kumbhar Wada (area of earthen potmakers) and the Tambat Ali (area of brass/copper utensil manufacturers).

== History ==
=== Ancient history ===
In 2003, an accidental discovery of artefacts from the Satvahana period in the Kasba peth area of Pune has put the origin of settled life in the area to the early part of the first millennium. Traditional accounts state that the temples of Puneshwar and Narayaneshwar were turned into the Sufi shrines of Dhakta Shaikh Salla Dargah and Thorla Shaikh Salla Dargah respectively during early Islamic rule in the 1300s. According to legend, some children had brought cows to the area to graze, and found an idol of Ganapati. Then, they colored this idol and started worshipping it. Shivaji's mother Jijabai also visited the temple often.This is where the Kasba Ganpati Temple is located today.

== Business and Amenities ==
=== Places of worship ===
==== Hindu temples ====
- Kasba Ganapati Temple: This is the village deity of Pune.
- Tvashta Kasar Devi Temple: This goddess is considered as the goddess of Kasar society.
- Trimbakeshwar Temple
- Puneshwar Maruti Temple
- Gavkos Maruti Temple
- Kedareshwar Temple
- Baloba Munjoba Temple
- Kalbhairavnath Temple
- Gundacha Ganpati

==== Shaikh Sallah Dargah ====
The 14th century shrines, which came to be known as the Dhakta Shaikh Salla Dargah and the Thorla Shaikh Salla Dargah, have been among the more popular religious places in Pune over the centuries.

=== Businesses ===
The part of the Peth near the Mutha river is known as Kumbhar Wada, where kumbhar, or potters, reside. Skilled metal craftsmen (known as Tambat) known for crafting utensils out of brass and copper also reside there. There is also a tailor's lane in the peth.

=== Places of interest ===
- Lal Mahal
- Sardar Shitole Wada
- Sardar Mujumdar Wada
