= Narayaneshwar =

Temple in India

Narayaneshwar Mahadev Mandir and Puneshwar were two temples in Pune demolished under the rule of the Delhi Sultanate led by Nizamuddin and other religious preachers. Two of these preachers were later buried there. The dargah built over the Narayaneshwar temple is now the 'Thorla (Senior) Sheikh Salla dargah' and is located on the bank of the Mutha River, not far from the Shaniwar Wada.

The temple remains one of the earliest named temples, after Pataleshwar Caves in the city of Pune, although it does not exist in its original form now.
