= Shaniwar Wada =

Historical fortification in the city of Pune, India

Coordinates: 18°31′8.67″N 73°51′19.62″E

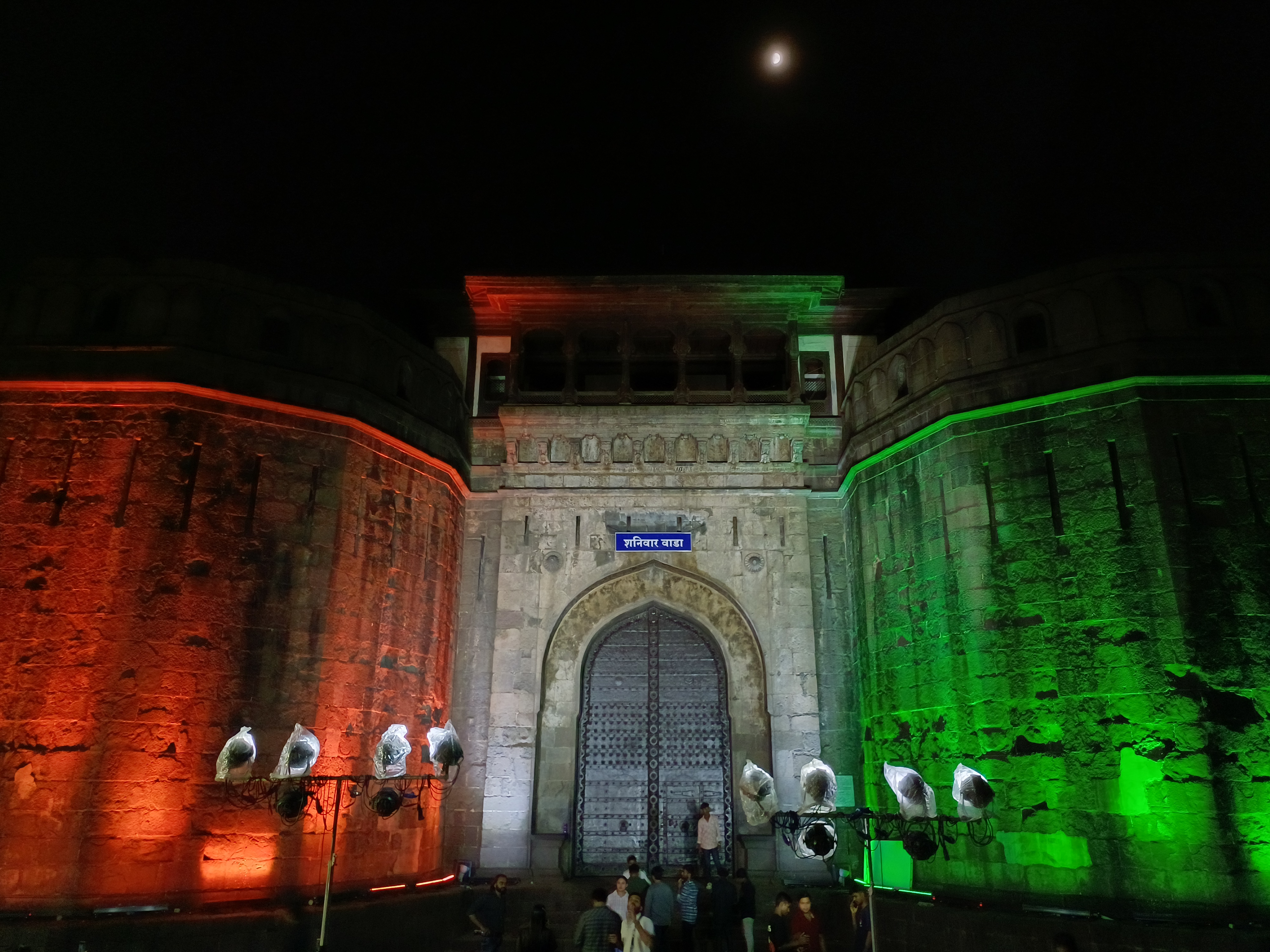
- Shaniwar Wada illuminated in Indian tricolour
- Interactive map of Shaniwar Wada
- Location: Pune, India

History
- Built: 22 January 1732; 294 years ago

Site notes
- Architectural style: Maratha architecture
- Owner: Maratha Confederacy (1732–1818); East India Company (1818–1858); British India (1858–1947); Union of India (1947–1950); Republic of India (1950–present)

Shaniwar Wada is a historical fortification in the city of Pune, India. Built in 1732, it was the seat of the Peshwas of the Maratha Confederacy until 1818. The fort itself was largely destroyed in 1828 by an unexplained fire, but the surviving structures are now maintained as a tourist site.

== History ==
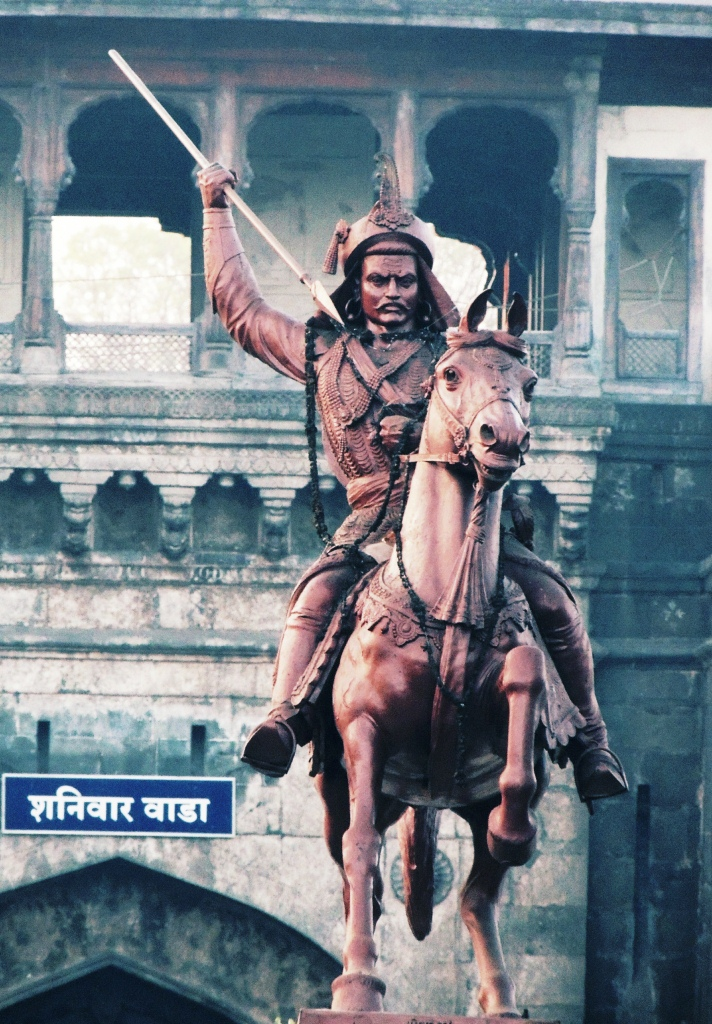
An equestrian statue of Peshwa Baji Rao I, Prime Minister of the Maratha Empire, in the Shaniwar Wada complex. He was the first resident of the fortified palace.

The Shaniwar Wada was normally the seven-story capital building of the Peshwas of the Maratha Empire. It was supposed to be made entirely of stone. However, after the completion of the base floor or the first story, the people of Satara (the national capital) complained to the Chhatrapati Shahu saying that a stone monument can be sanctioned and built only by the Chhatrapati himself and not the Peshwas. Following this, an official letter was written to the Peshwas stating that the remaining building had to be made of brick and not stone.

By 1758, at least a thousand people lived in the fort. In 1773, Narayanrao, who was the tenth and ruling Peshwa then, was murdered by guards on orders of his uncle Raghunathrao and aunt Anandibai. A popular legend has it that Narayanrao's ghost still calls for help on full moon nights. Various people, working around the area, have allegedly reported the cries of "Kaka mala vachava" (Uncle, save me) by Narayanrao Peshwa after his death. The book, Assassination of the Peshwa, written in English and Marathi, covers this incident in detail.

In June 1818, the Peshwa, Bajirao II, abdicated his Gaadi (throne) to Sir John Malcolm of the British East India Company and went into political exile at Bithoor, near Kanpur in present-day Uttar Pradesh, India. On 27 February 1828, a great fire started inside the palace complex. The conflagration raged for seven days. Only the heavy granite ramparts, strong teak gateways and deep foundations and ruins of the buildings within the fort survived.

According to Haricharitramrutsagar, a biographical text of Bhagwan Swaminarayan, he had visited Shaniwarwada on the insistence of Bajirao II in 1799.

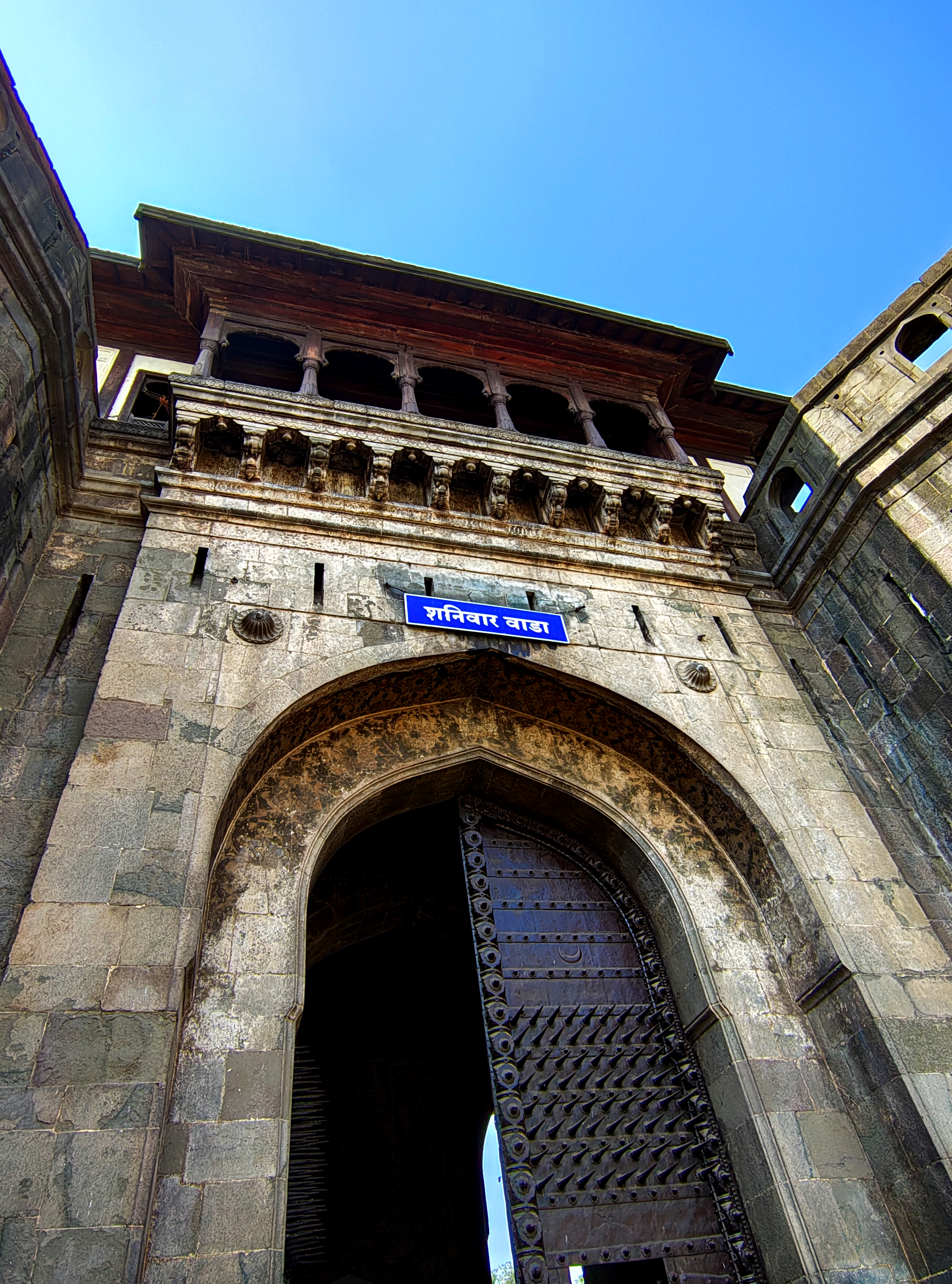
Shaniwar Wada Main Entrance

== Construction ==
The imposing walls of the Shaniwar Wada, in an 1860 photograph

Peshwa Baji Rao I, prime minister to Chattrapati Shahu, laid the ceremonial foundation of his own residence on Saturday, 10 January 1730. It was named Shaniwar Wada from the Marathi words Shaniwar (Saturday) and Wada (a general term for any residence complex). Teak was imported from the jungles of Junnar, stone was brought from the nearby quarries of Chinchwad, and Lime (mineral) was brought from the lime-belts of Jejuri. Shaniwarwada was completed in 1732, at a total cost of Rs. 16,110, a very large sum at that time.

The opening ceremony was performed according to religious customs, on 22 January 1732, another Saturday chosen for being a particularly auspicious day.

Later the Peshwas made several additions, including the fortification walls, with bastions and gates; court halls and other buildings; fountains and reservoirs. Currently, the perimeter fortification wall has five gateways and nine bastion towers, enclosing a garden complex with the foundations of the original buildings. It is situated near the Mula-Mutha River, in Kasba Peth.

== Fort complex ==
=== Gates ===
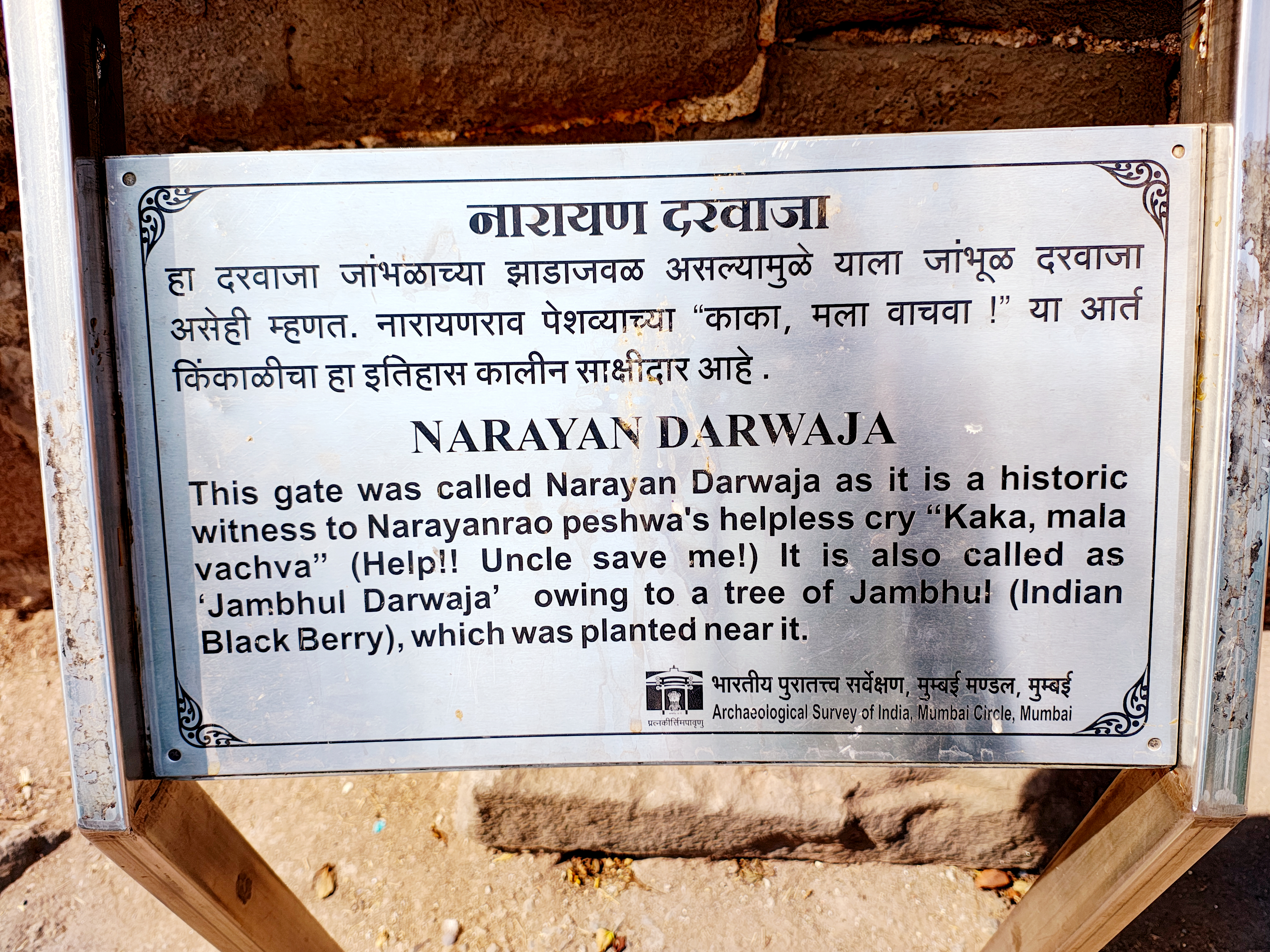
Narayan Gate Information Plaque, Shaniwar Wada

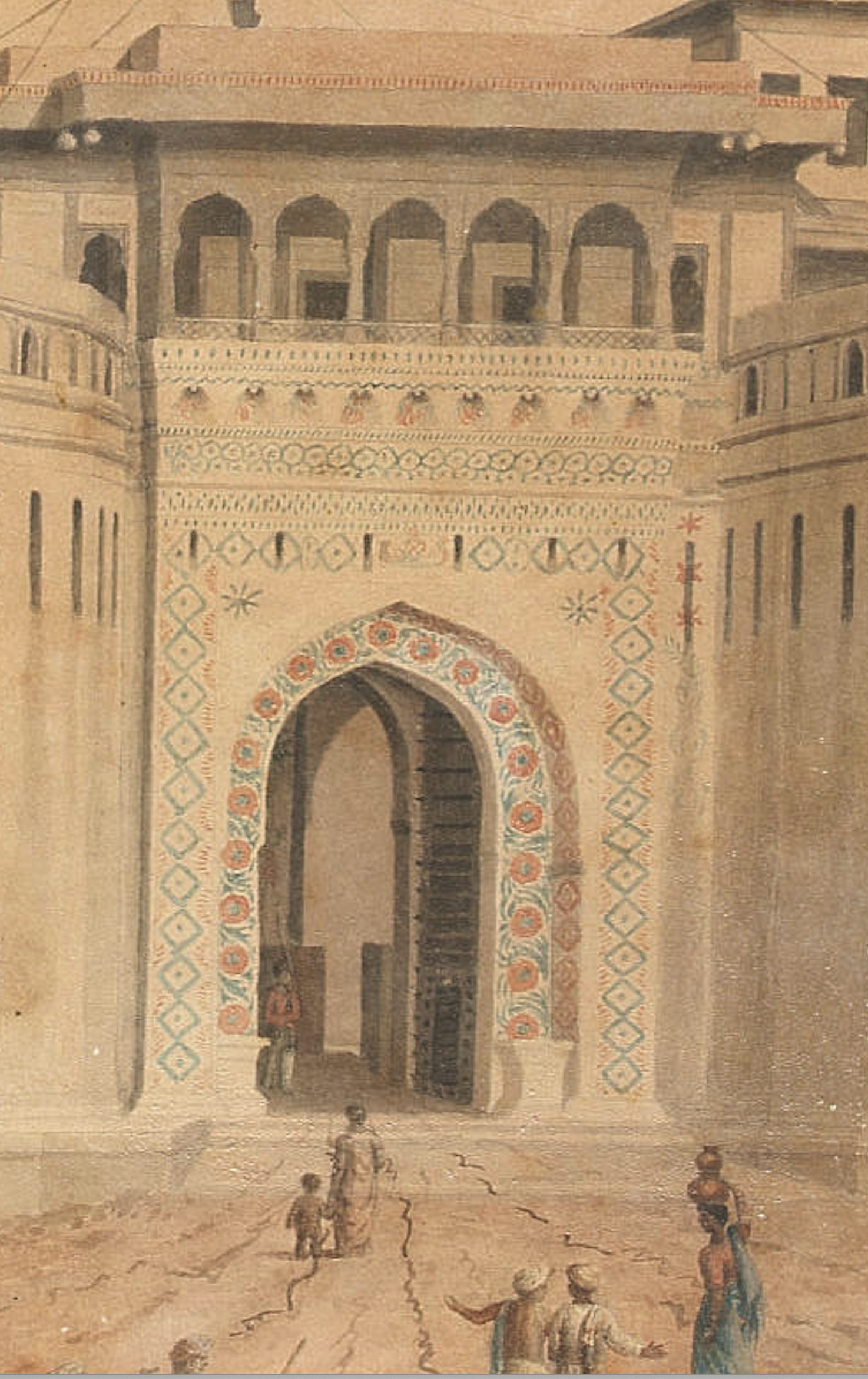
Shaniwar Wada palace's Delhi Gate or Delhi Darwaza, with its original decorations,1820

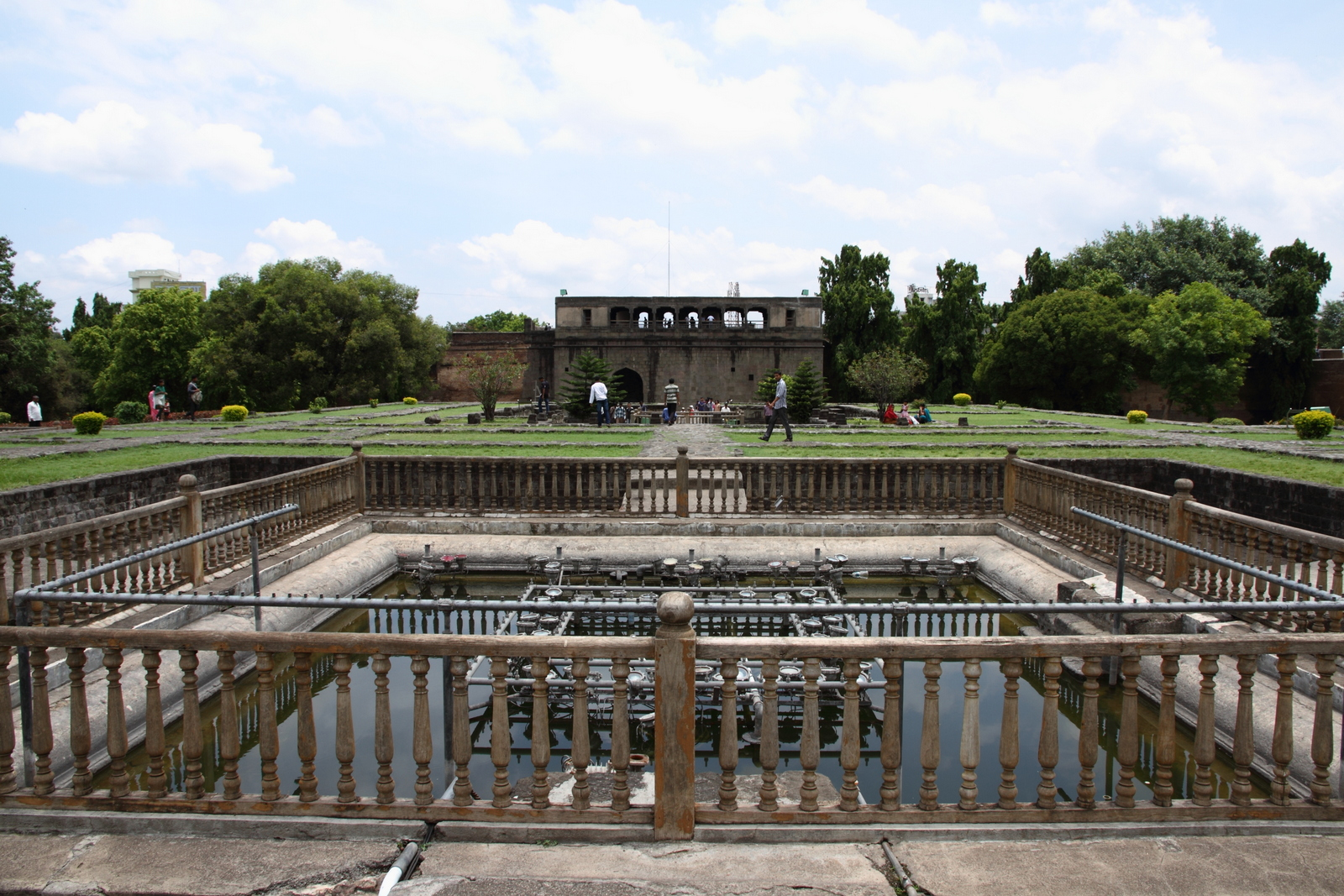
Shaniwar Wada palace fountain, the Hazari Karanje

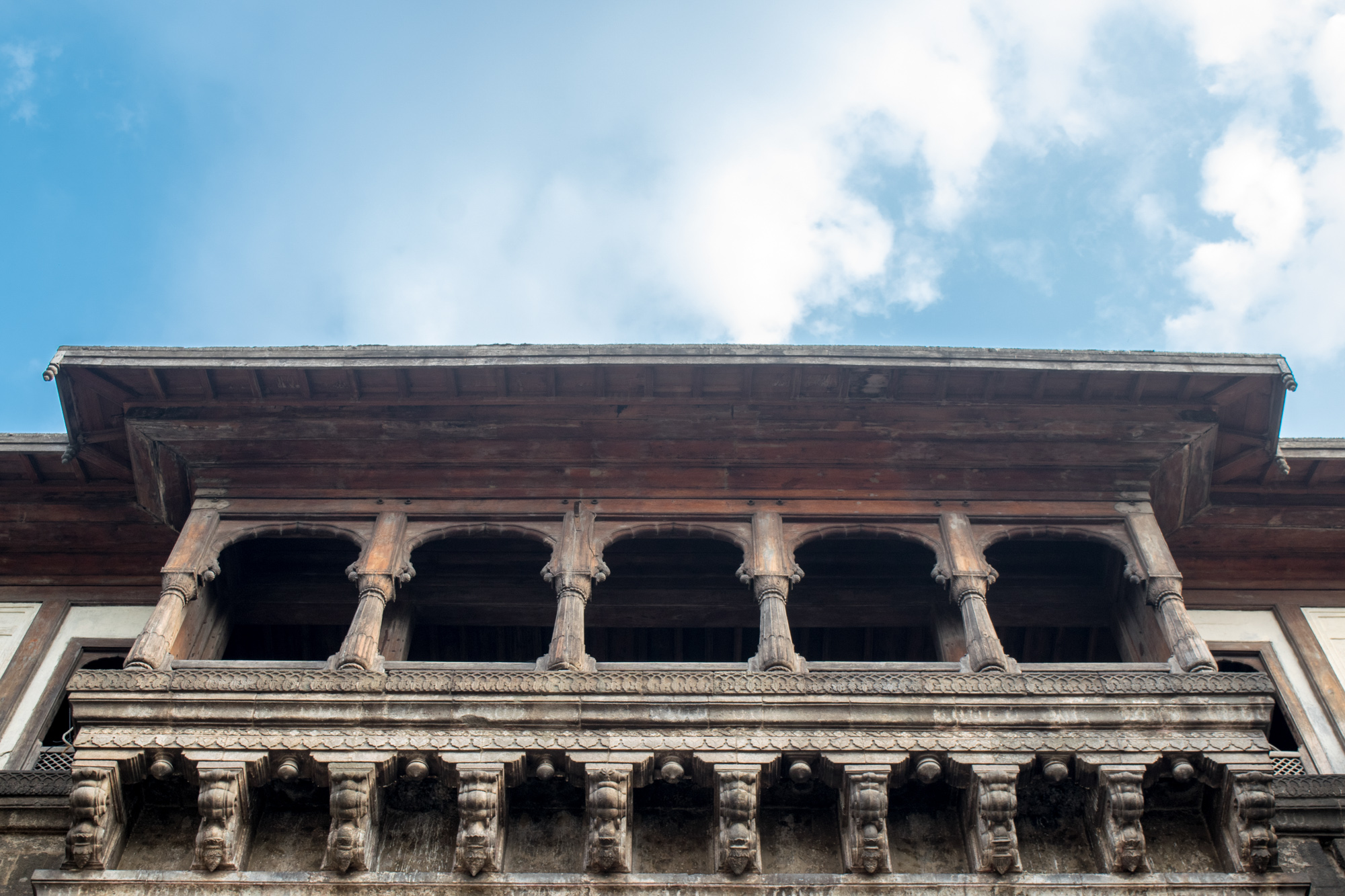
Jharokhas at the Shaniwar wada.

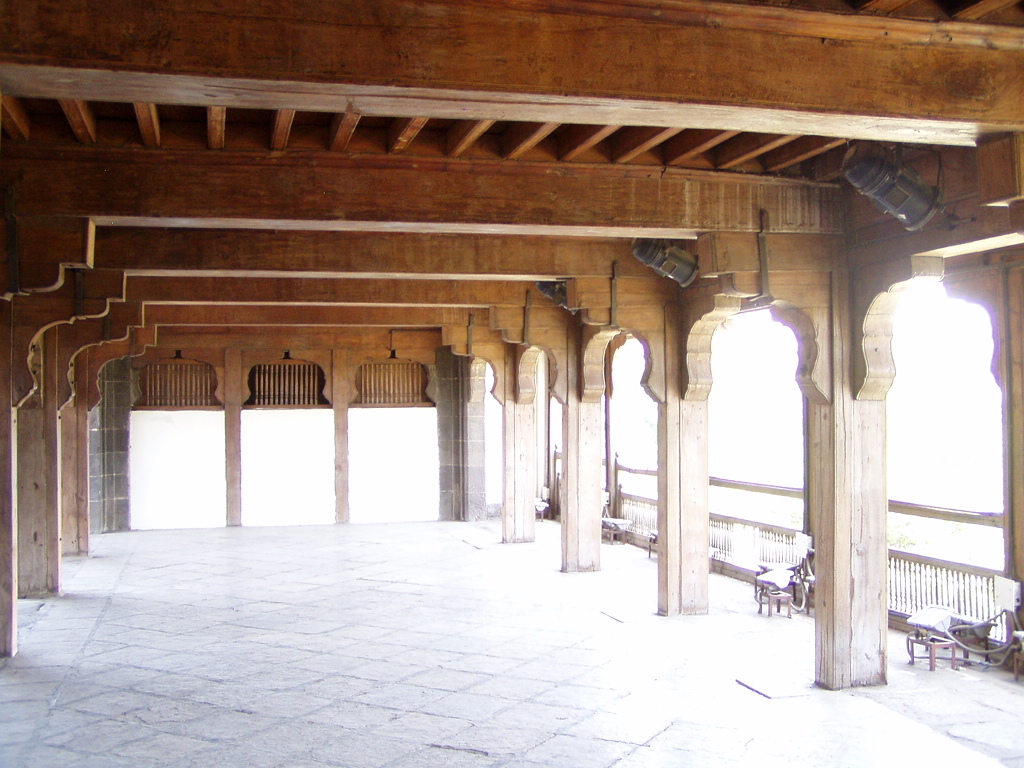
A hall in the first floor above dilli darwaja (Delhi Gate)

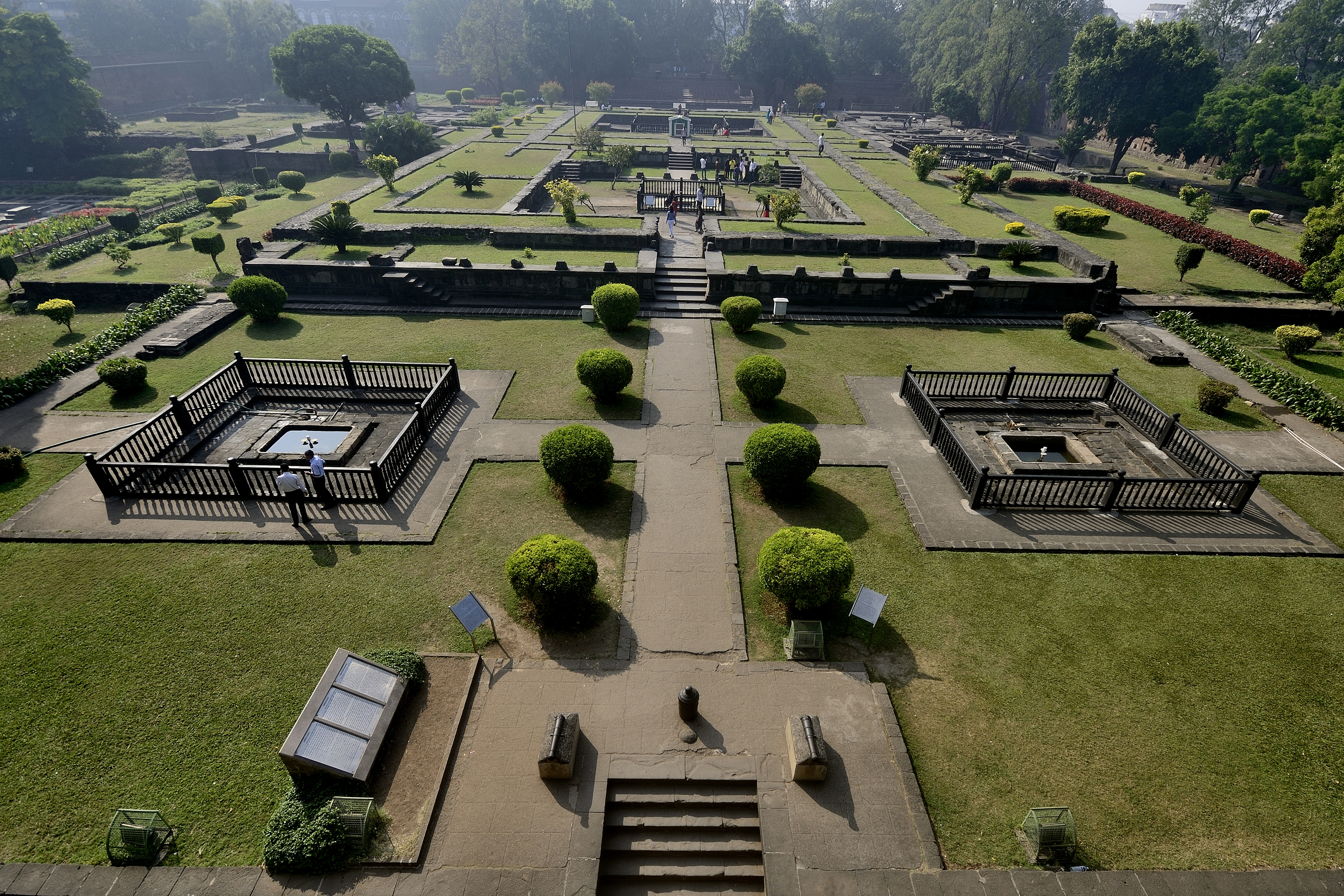
Gardens of Shaniwar Wada

Shaniwar Wada has five gates:

- Delhi Darwaza

The Delhi Darwaza is the main gate of the complex, and faces north towards Delhi. In fact, Shaniwar Wada is the only fort structure in India to have its main gate facing Delhi, the medieval imperial capital of Mughal Empire. Even Chhatrapati Shahu is said to have considered the north-facing fort an indication of Baji Rao's ambitions against the Mughal Empire, and suggested that the main gate should be made of chhaatiiche, maatiche naahi! (Marathi for "of the chests of brave soldiers, not made of mud").

The strongly built Delhi Darwaza gatehouse has massive doors, large enough to admit elephants outfitted with howdahs (seating canopies). To discourage elephants charging the gates, each pane of the gate has seventy-two sharp twelve-inch steel spikes arranged in a nine by eight grid, at approximately the height of the forehead of a battle-elephant. Each pane was also fortified with steel cross members, and borders were bolted with steel bolts having sharpened cone heads. The bastions flanking the gatehouse has arrow-loops and machicolation chutes through which boiling oil could be poured onto offending raiders. The right pane has a small man-sized door for usual entries and exits, too small to allow an army to enter rapidly. Shaniwar Wada was built by a contractor from Rajasthan known as 'Kumawat' of the Rajput Sub-caste, after completing construction they were given the name 'Naik' by the Peshwa.

Even if the main gates were to be forced open, a charging army would need to turn sharply right, then sharply left, to pass through the gateway and into the central complex. This would provide a defending army with another chance to attack the incoming army, and to launch a counterattack to recapture the gateway.

As the ceremonial gate of the fort, military campaigns would set out from and be received back here, with appropriate religious ceremonies.

- Mastani Darwaza (Mastani's Gate) or Aliibahadur Darwaja, facing north

This gate was the entrance leading to Bajirao I's wife Mastani's palace and was used by her while travelling out of the palace's perimeter wall.

- Khidki Darwaza (Window Gate), facing east

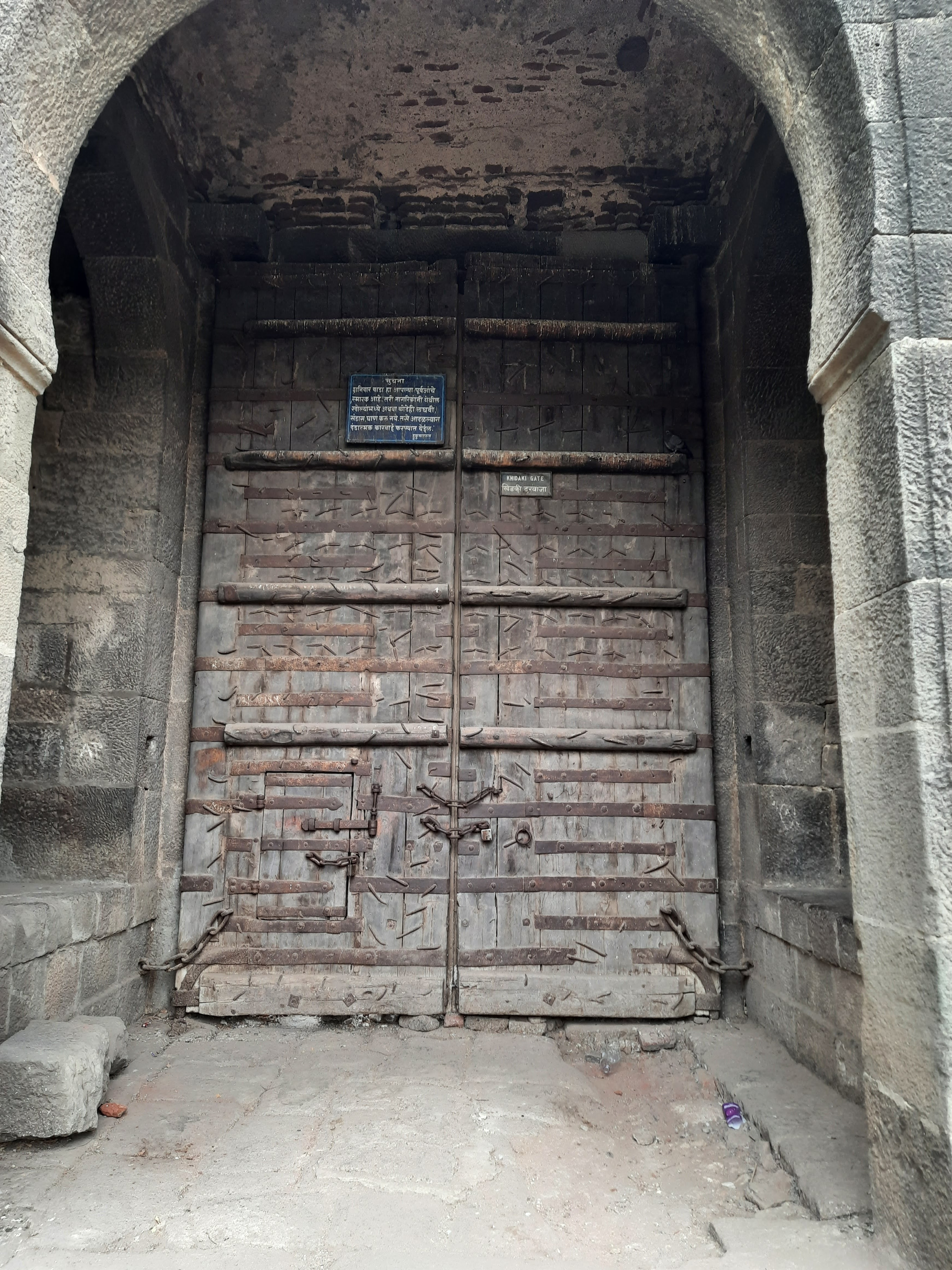
Khidki Darwaja (Window Gate)

The Khidki Darwaja is named for an armoured window it contains.

- Ganesh Darwaza (Ganesh Gate), facing south-east

Named for the Ganesh Rang Mahal, which used to stand near this door. It was used by ladies at the fort to visit the nearby Kasba Ganapati temple.

- Jambhul Darwaza or Narayan Darwaja (Narayan's Gate), facing south

This gate was used by concubines to enter and leave the fort. It obtained its second name after Narayanrao Peshwa's corpse was removed from the fort for cremation through this gate. He is said to have been assassinated at this gate.

=== Palaces ===
The important buildings in the palace includes the Thorlya Rayancha Diwankhana (Marathi: the court reception hall of the eldest royal, meaning Baji Rao I), Naachacha Diwankhana (Dance Hall), and Juna Arsa Mahal (Old Mirror Hall).

Since the buildings were destroyed in the fire of 1828, only descriptions of the living areas of the fort are available. All the state halls in the buildings are said to have doorways with exquisitely carved teak arches, with ornamental teardrop teak pillars shaped like Suru (cypress tree) trunks supporting the ceilings, which were covered with beautiful teak tracery, carved creepers and flowers. Exquisite glass chandeliers hung from the ceilings. The floors were made of highly polished marble, arranged in a mosaic pattern and adorned with rich Persian rugs. The walls contained paintings with scenes from the Hindu epics, the Ramayana and the Mahabharata.

The buildings are said to have been designed and constructed by well-known artisans, including Shivaram Krishna Khasgiwale, Devaji Sutar, Kondaji Sutar, Morarji Patharwat Bhojraja (an inlay-work expert from Jaipur) and Ragho (a painter).

It is said that the Shaniwarwada complex was seven storeys high. On the top floor was the residence of the Peshwa which was called Meghadambari. It is said that the spire of Jñāneśvar temple at Alandi, 17 km away, could be seen from there.

=== The Fountain ===
The complex had an impressive lotus-shaped fountain: the Hazari Karanje (Fountain of a thousand jets). It was constructed for the pleasure of the infant Peshwa Sawai Madhavrao. It was designed as a sixteen petal lotus; each petal had sixteen jets with an eighty-foot arch. It was the most complicated and intricate fountain of its time.

Shrimant Anandrao Rudrajirao Dhulap-More (an admiral of Maratha navy in 18th century) who visited the Shaniwarwada in 1791 described it as "very magnificent. A hundred dancers can dance here at a time. In one corner is a marble Ganapati statue and the palace is flanked by a fountain and a flower garden.".

== Popular culture ==
- In 2008, Shaniwar Wada was featured on The Amazing Race Asia 3. In the game show, one participant from each team of two had to find the correct pheta (turban) from among those worn by 50 men within the Wada.
- It was featured in 2014 Marathi historical drama Rama Madhav.
- Shaniwar Wada featured in the 2015 Hindi historical film Bajirao Mastani.
- Shaniwar Wada featured in the 2019 Hindi historical film Panipat.
- Shaniwar Wada featured in 2019 Marathi TV Series Swamini on Colors Marathi where grand set of Shaniwar wada was constructed in Mumbai Film City.

== Gallery ==
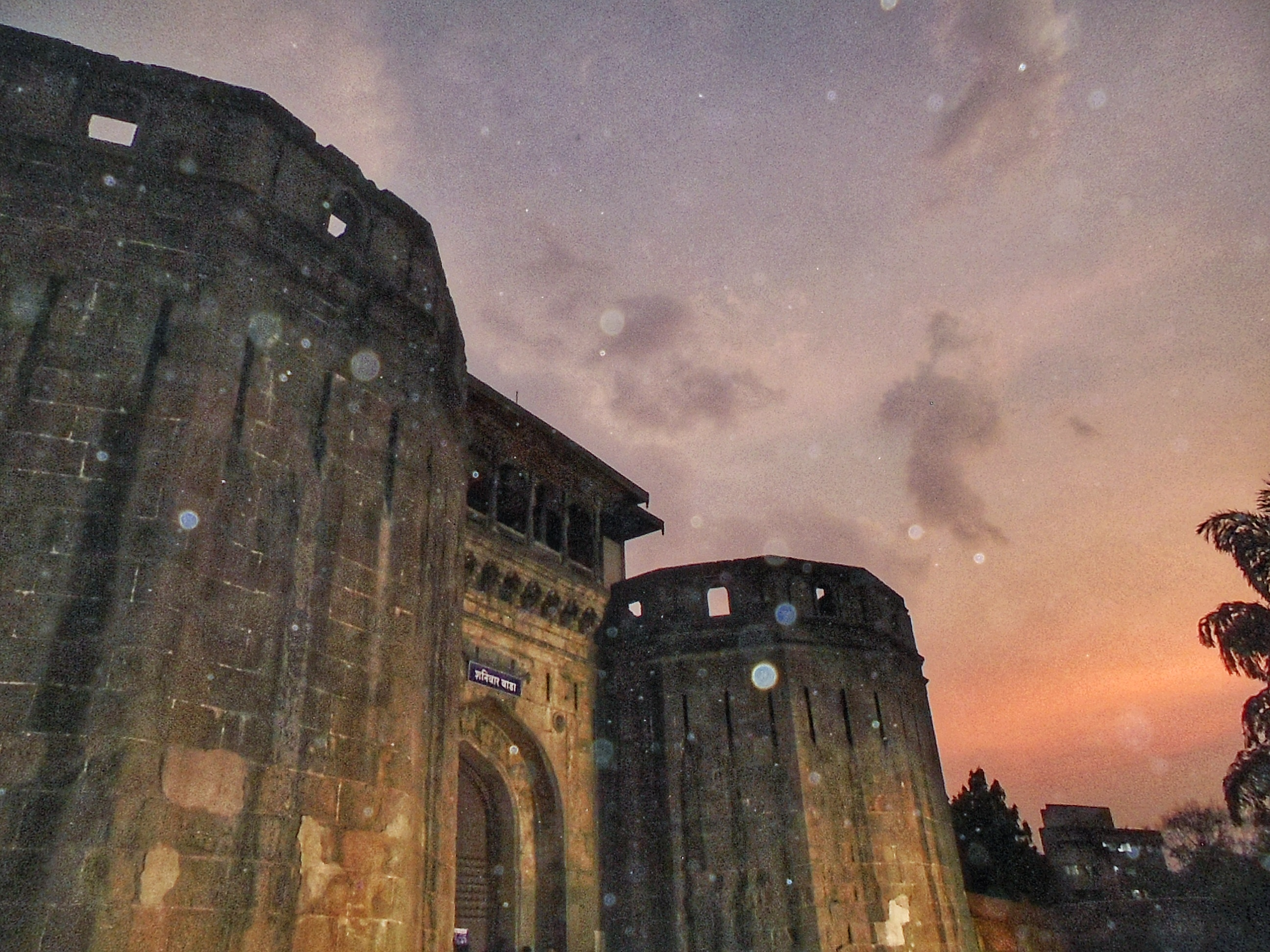
Shaniwar Wada during sunset

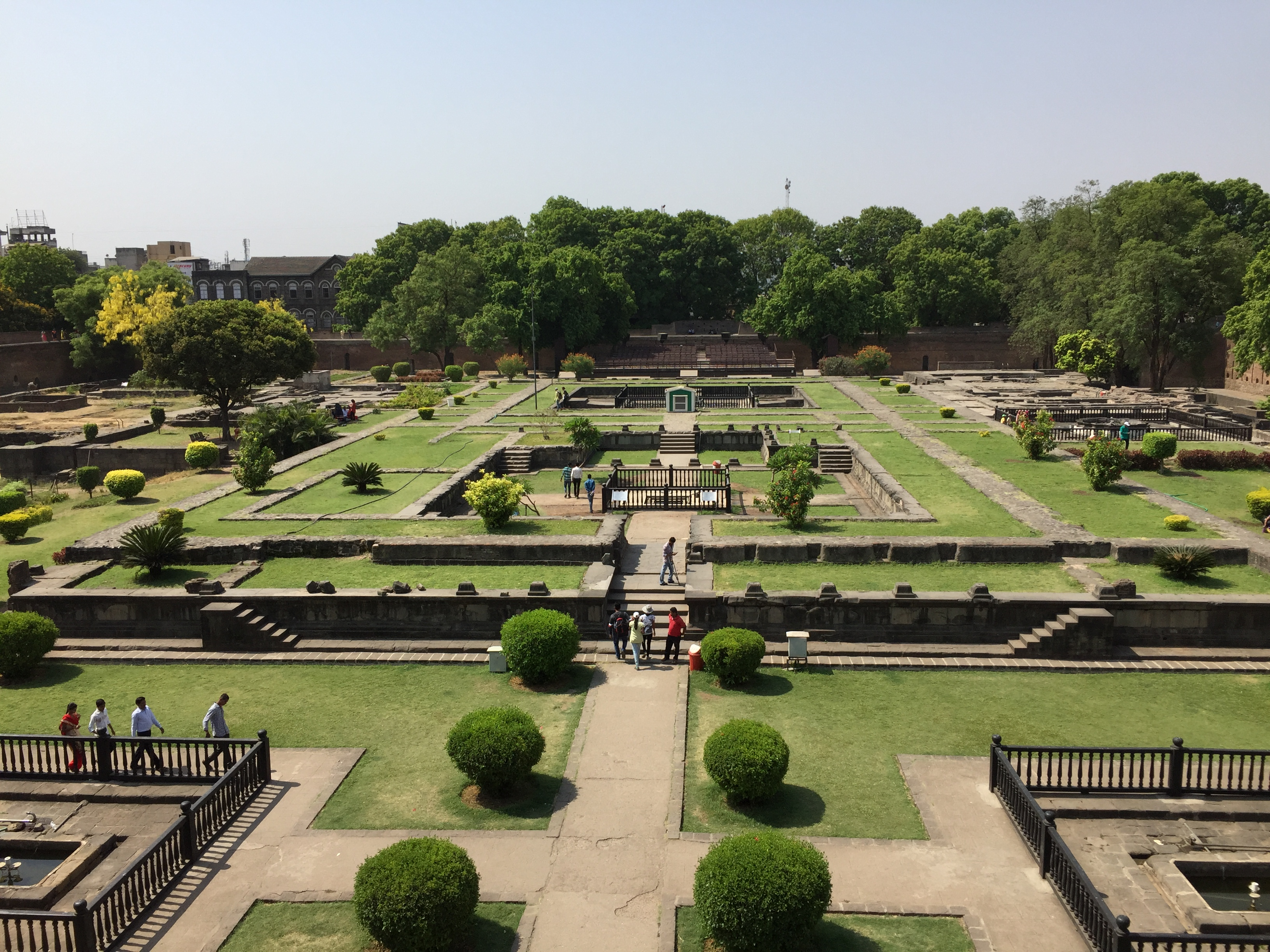
Inside Shaniwar Wada

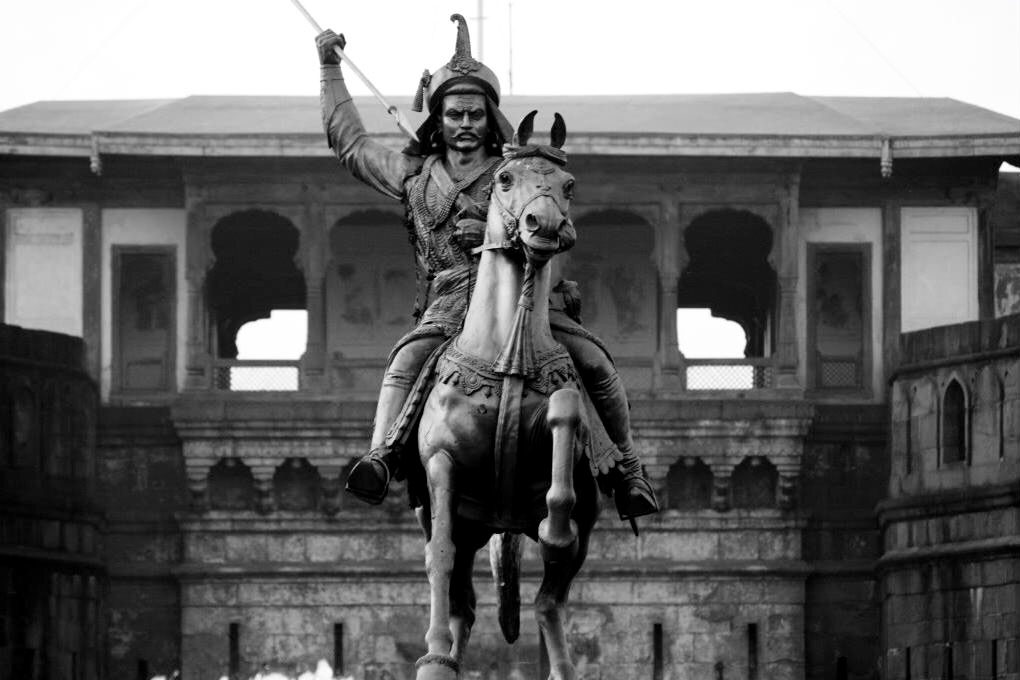
Statue of Bajirao I

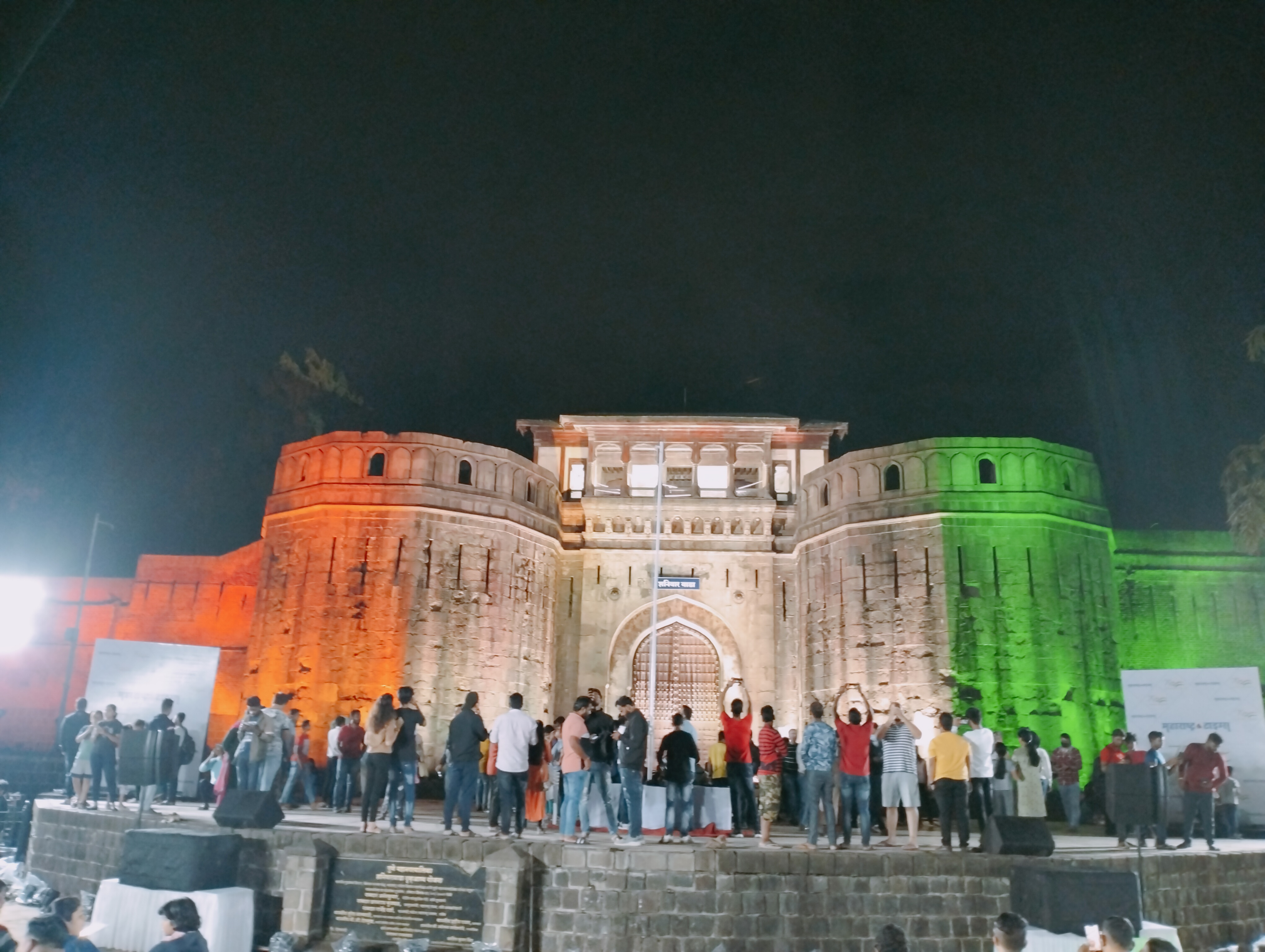
Wada during Indian Independence Day celebrations.

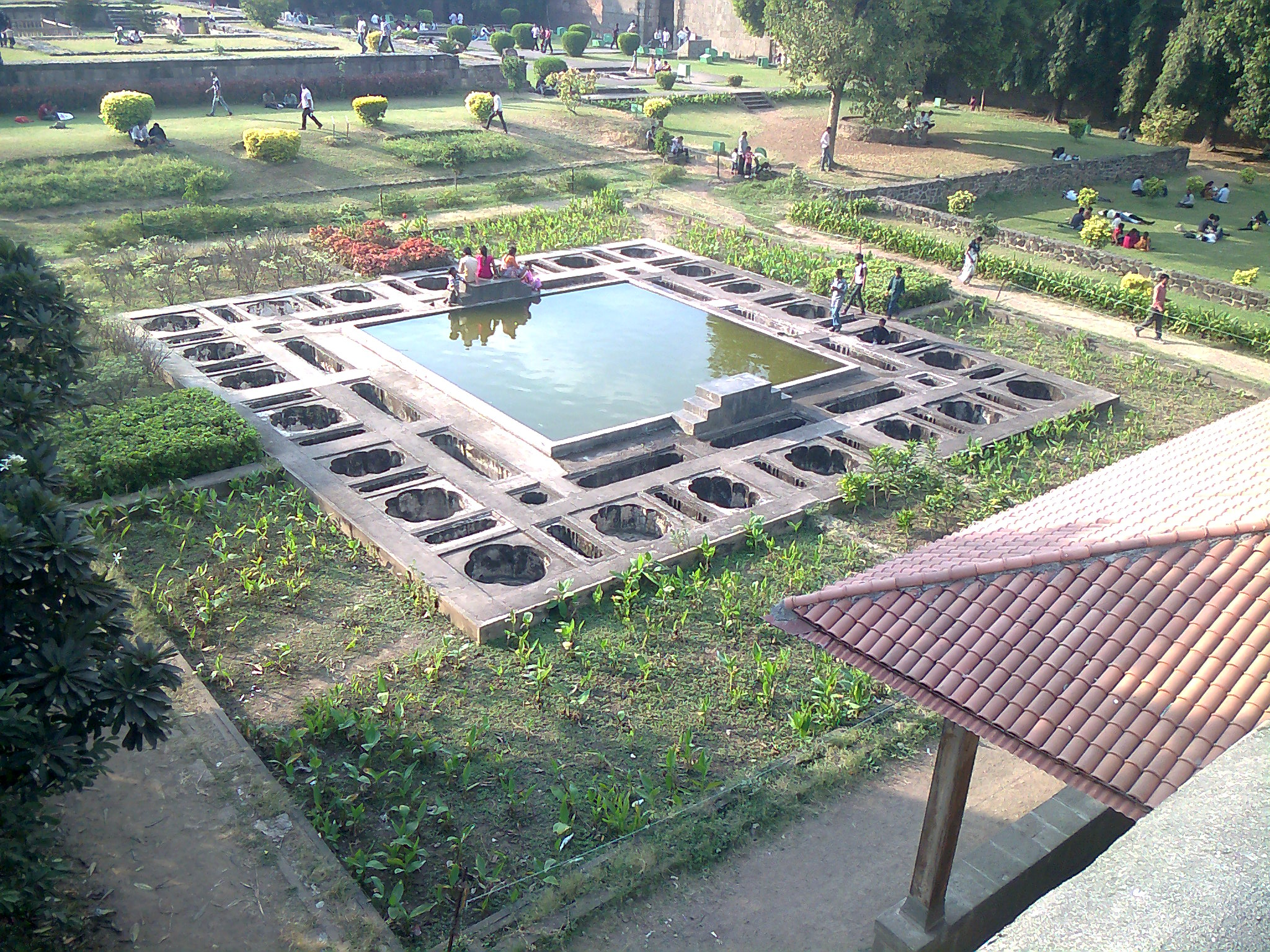
Water Storage Space

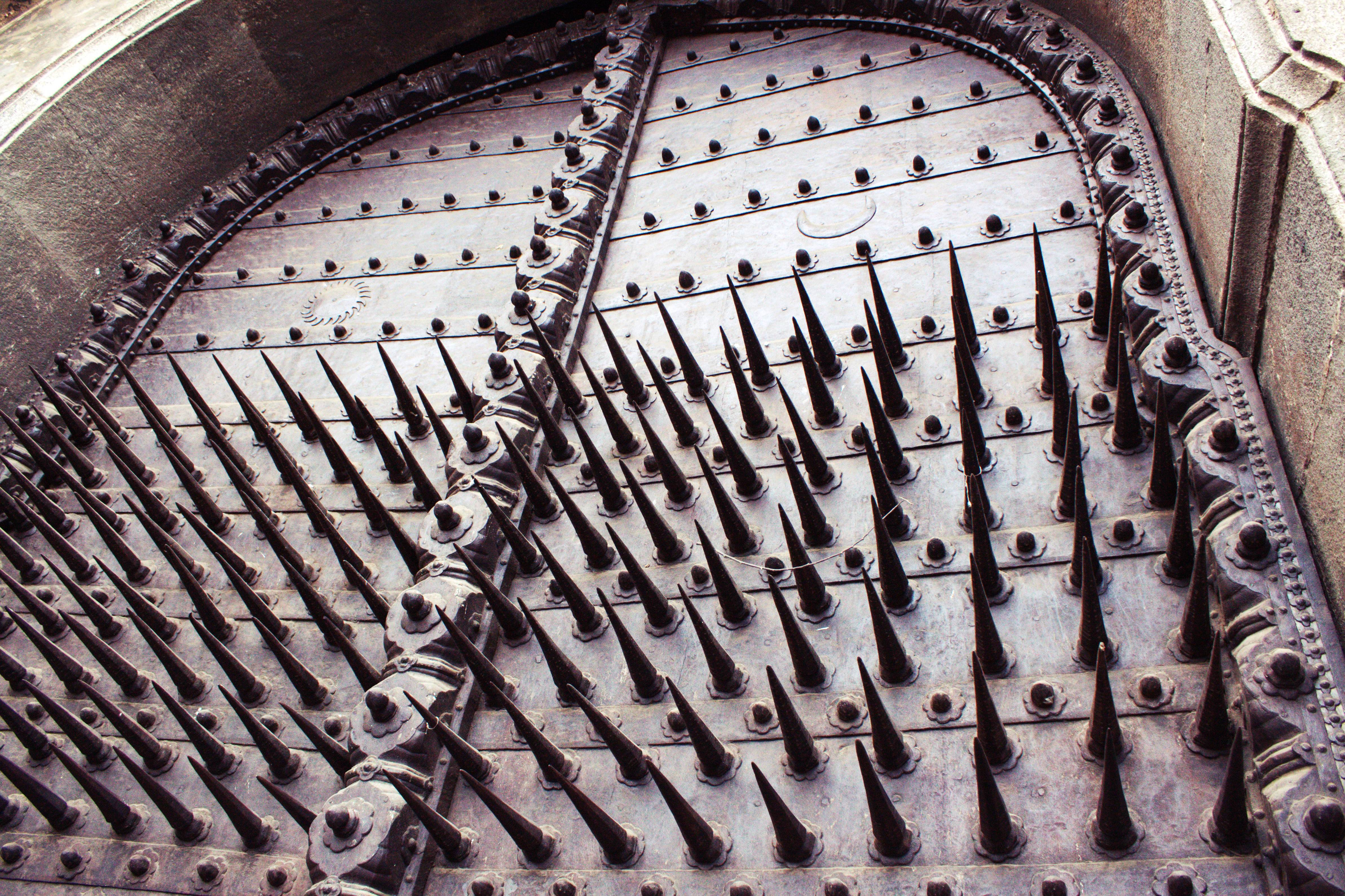
Pointed main gates.

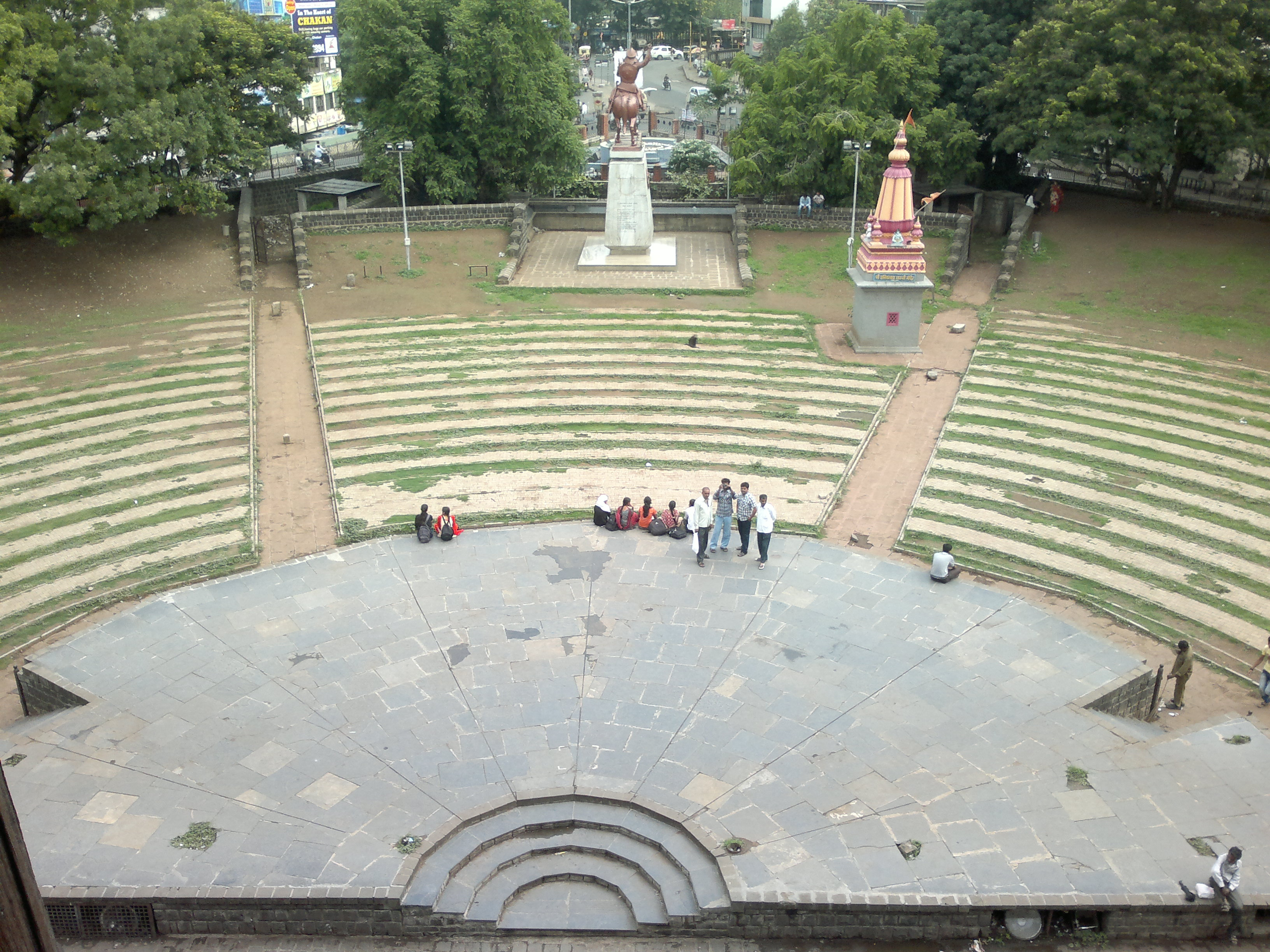
Top view of entrance to wada

== See also ==
- New Palace, Kolhapur of the Bhonsle Chhatrapatis
- Laxmi Vilas Palace, Vadodara of the Gaekwads
- Jai Vilas Palace, Gwalior of the Scindias
- Bhor Rajwada of Pant Sachivs
- Rajwada, Indore of Holkars
- Thanjavur Maratha palace of the Bhonsles
- List of forts in Maharashtra
