= Puneshwar =

Temple in Pune, Maharashtra, India

Punyeshwar Mahadev Mandir
- Location in Pune, Maharashtra, India

Religion
- Affiliation: Hinduism
- Deity: Shiva

Location
- Location: Pune
- State: Maharashtra
- Country: India
- Coordinates: 18°31′23.55″N 73°51′30.76″E

Punyeshwar Mahadev Mandir was a Shiva temple along the bank of the Mutha river in Pune. Along with Puneshwar there existed another temple named Narayaneshwar. In the late thirteenth century Puneshwar temple was pulled down and converted into a dargah now called Dhakta (Younger) Sheikh Salla Dargah, which stands in its place to this day. The Narayaneshwar was also converted into the Senior Sheikh Salla dargah around the same time. In 2006, a wall along the river collapsed leading to finding of old artefacts of the Puneshwar temple under the dargah.

The temple remains one of the earliest named temples, after Pataleshwar Caves in the city of Pune, although it does not exist in its original form now.

The city of Pune is named after Puneshwar temple.
