= Kasba Ganapati =

Hindu Temple

Kasba Ganapati Temple
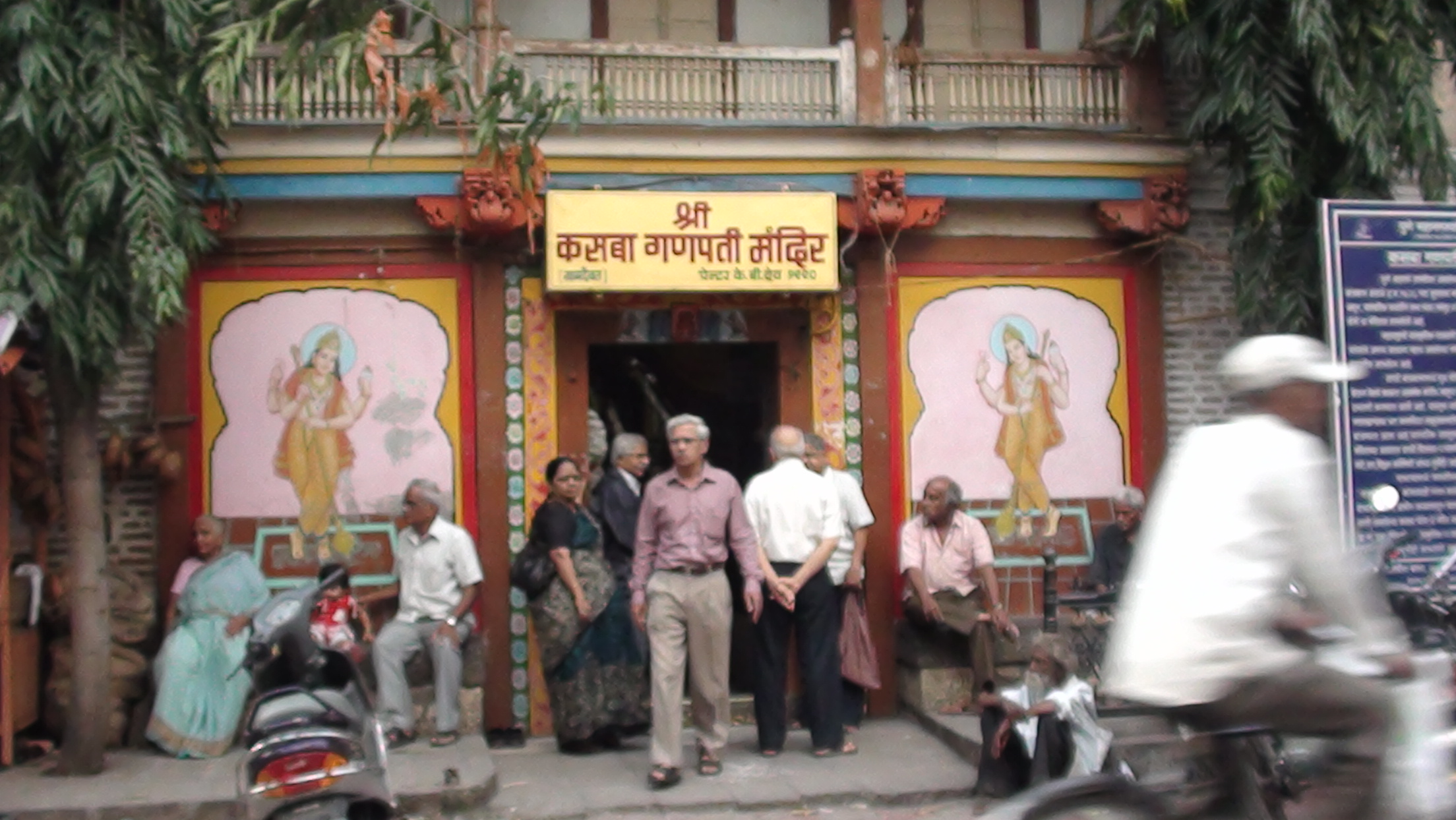

- Location in Maharashtra

Religion
- Affiliation: Hinduism
- District: Pune
- Deity: Ganesh

Location
- State: Maharashtra
- Country: India
- Coordinates: 18°31′08″N 73°51′25″E

The Kasba Ganapati refers to both a particular murti of the god Ganapati in Pune, India, as well as to the temple built around the murti. The Kasba Ganapati is the presiding deity (gramadevata) of Pune. Kasba Ganpati is considered the first Manacha Ganpati, or most revered Ganpati, in Pune, Maharashtra. The idol was established in 1893 and is located in the Kasba Peth area of Pune, an ancient part of the city. It is patronized by Ganapati Bapurao Bebhan Durbar and is considered the presiding deity of Pune. The idol is said to be self-made and was originally the size of a grain of rice, but is now larger due to a layer of red sandalwood.

== History ==
The temple was commissioned by Jijausaheb, after Dadoji Konddeo reported to her that a murti of Ganpati had been found in Pune. The murti's status as the premier murti in Pune was decided by Bal Gangadhar Tilak.

In the year 1630, the Maratha Aristocrat and wife of Sardar Shahaji Bhosale, Jijaubaisaheb Bhosale arrived in Pune with her then infant son, Chhatrapati Shivaji maharaj, the founder of Maratha Empire. Around this time, along with other seven families, the Thakar Family migrated to Pune from the village of Indi, Bijapur district in present-day state of Karnataka. Shri Vinayak Bhatt Thakar also carried his Family deity, Lord Gajanan along with him. All these families settled near River bank around the current place of Kasba Ganapati Temple which was close to the residence of Jijabai. Jijabai perceived this as an auspicious moment and promptly decided to build a temple, which is popularly known as the Kasba Ganpati Mandir.

Since then, Pune is also known as the city of Ganesh. The Peshwas were ardent followers of Lord Ganesh. During their regime Shaniwarwada witnessed grand celebrations for Lord Ganesh.

In 1893, Bal Gangadhar Tilak, the Indian Nationalist Leader, initiated the now famous Ganesh Festival. His intention was to gather people sharing similar ideas and exchange thoughts to deal with the British ruler. He started celebrating Ganesh Festival from his own house called Kesari Wada. Due to his personal popularity and initiative, Ganesh Festival became a public festival soon afterwards.

There was rivalry among the various mandals regarding the privilege of immersing the murti first on the last day of the Ganpati festival. Bal Gangadhar Tilak resolved the rivalry and declared the privilege of first immersion to Shri Kasba Ganpati, as it is the local deity of Pune.

== Annual Ganesh Festival ==
Visarjan of the idol

Until 1925, Shri Kasba Ganpati Mandal celebrated the festival within the premises of the temple and from 1926 it has been celebrated in an enclosed mandap. Presently, the ten days of the festival is a platform for local artists to display their talents through various cultural programs thus allowing a large number of devotees to participate in the celebrations. On the last day, Shri Kasba Ganpati plays the leading role during the immersion procession.
