= Urse =

Village in Maharashtra

- village
- Location in Maharashtra, India Urse (India)
- Coordinates: 19.8704597°N 72.8781322°E
- Country: India
- State: Maharashtra
- District: Palghar
- Taluka: Dahanu
- Elevation: 154 m (505 ft)

Population (2011)
  - Total: 1,095
- Time zone: UTC+5:30 (IST)
- 2011 census code: 551704

Urse is a village in the Palghar district of Maharashtra, India. It is located in the Dahanu taluka.

== Demographics ==
According to the 2011 census of India, Urse has 225 households. The effective literacy rate (i.e. the literacy rate of population excluding children aged 6 and below) is 68.48%.

Demographics (2011 Census)
	Total	Male	Female
Population	1095	585	510
Children aged below 6 years	137	77	60
Scheduled caste	1	1	0
Scheduled tribe	632	349	283
Literates	656	387	269
Workers (all)	617	311	306
Main workers (total)	282	154	128
Main workers: Cultivators	129	71	58
Main workers: Agricultural labourers	75	40	35
Main workers: Household industry workers	32	16	16
Main workers: Other	46	27	19
Marginal workers (total)	335	157	178
Marginal workers: Cultivators	148	66	82
Marginal workers: Agricultural labourers	33	14	19
Marginal workers: Household industry workers	47	18	29
Marginal workers: Others	107	59	48
Non-workers	478	274	204
