= Baramati Assembly constituency =

Constituency of the Maharashtra legislative assembly in India

Coordinates: 18°9′22.65″N 74°34′49.04″E

- Constituency No. 201 for the Maharashtra Legislative Assembly

Constituency details
- Country: India
- Region: Western India
- State: Maharashtra
- District: Pune
- Lok Sabha constituency: Baramati
- Established: 1951
- Total electors: 381,157
- Reservation: None

Member of Legislative Assembly
- 15th Maharashtra Legislative Assembly
- Incumbent Sunetra Pawar
- Party: NCP
- Alliance: NDA
- Preceded by: Ajit Pawar

Baramati Assembly constituency is one of the 288 Vidhan Sabha (legislative assembly) constituencies of Maharashtra state in western India. It is one of the 21 constituencies located in the Pune district.

Baramati is part of the Baramati Lok Sabha constituency along with five other Vidhan Sabha constituencies in the Pune district, namely, Daund, Indapur, Purandar, Bhor

== Members of the Legislative Assembly ==
Year	Member	Party
1952	Gulabrao Dadasaheb Mulik	Indian National Congress
1957	Nanasaheb Bapuji Jagtap	Peasants and Workers Party of India
1957	Sambhaji Bandoba Londhe	Scheduled Castes Federation
1962	Malatibai Madhavrao Shirole	Indian National Congress
1967	Sharad Pawar	Indian National Congress
1972	Sharad Pawar	Indian National Congress
1978	Sharad Pawar	Indian National Congress
1980	Sharad Pawar	Indian National Congress (U)
1985	Sharad Pawar	Indian Congress (Socialist)
1990	Sharad Pawar	Indian National Congress
1991^	Ajit Pawar	Indian National Congress
1995	Ajit Pawar	Indian National Congress
1999	Ajit Pawar	Nationalist Congress Party
2004	Ajit Pawar	Nationalist Congress Party
2009	Ajit Pawar	Nationalist Congress Party
2014	Ajit Pawar	Nationalist Congress Party
2019	Ajit Pawar	Nationalist Congress Party
2024	Ajit Pawar	Nationalist Congress Party
2026^	Sunetra Pawar	Nationalist Congress Party

^ denotes by-election

== Election results ==
Vote share of winning candidates
2026	97.81%
2024	66.32%
2019	83.80%
2014	66.45%
2009	68.26%
2004	69.07%
1999	69.72%
1995	71.91%
1991	90.43%
1990	86.89%
1985	58.66%
1980	66.80%
1978	59.96%
1972	75.50%
1967	63.10%
1962	46.86%
1957	33.81%
1952	59.02%

=== 2026 by-election ===
2026 Maharashtra Legislative Assembly by-election: Baramati
Party	Candidate	Votes	%	±%
NCP	Sunetra Ajit Pawar	218,969	97.81	▲31.49
Others	2 Other Parties	1,105	0.50	N/A
Independent	20 Independent Candidates	3,028	1.35	N/A
NOTA	None of the Above	774	0.35	▲0.06
Margin of victory		2,18,034	97.39	▲25.53
Turnout		2,23,878		
NCP hold		Swing		

=== Assembly Election 2024 ===
2024 Maharashtra Legislative Assembly election : Baramati
Party	Candidate	Votes	%	±%
NCP	Ajit Pawar	181,132	66.32	New
NCP-SP	Yogendra Srinivas Pawar	80,233	29.38	New
BPSP	Anurag Adinath Khalate	2,768	1.01	New
VBA	Mangaldas Tukaram Nikalje	1,584	0.60	New
NOTA	None of the above	779	0.29	▼0.39
Margin of victory		100,899	36.94	▼33.85
Turnout		273,895	71.86	▲3.04
Total valid votes		273,116		
Registered electors		381,157		▲11.36
NCP gain from NCP		Swing	▼17.48	

=== Assembly Election 2019 ===
2019 Maharashtra Legislative Assembly election : Baramati
Party	Candidate	Votes	%	±%
NCP	Ajit Pawar	195,641	83.80	▲17.35
BJP	Gopichand Padalkar	30,376	13.01	▼13.82
VBA	Gophane Avinash Shahaji	3,111	1.33	New
BSP	Ashok Ajinath Mane	1,421	0.61	▼0.87
NOTA	None of the above	1,579	0.68	▼0.03
Margin of victory		165,265	70.79	▲31.17
Turnout		235,539	68.82	▼4.87
Total valid votes		233,461		
Registered electors		342,270		▲10.41
NCP hold		Swing	▲17.35	

=== Assembly Election 2014 ===
2014 Maharashtra Legislative Assembly election : Baramati
Party	Candidate	Votes	%	±%
NCP	Ajit Pawar	150,588	66.45	▼1.81
BJP	Prabhakar Dadaram Gawade	60,797	26.83	New
SS	Adv. Rajendra Dattatraya Kale	4,086	1.80	▼8.62
INC	Adv. Akash Vijayrao More	4,013	1.77	New
BSP	Anil Haribhau Potre	3,349	1.48	▼1.73
NOTA	None of the above	1,619	0.71	New
Margin of victory		89,791	39.62	▼14.96
Turnout		228,429	73.69	▲8.87
Total valid votes		226,611		
Registered electors		309,993		▲6.70
NCP hold		Swing	▼1.81	

=== Assembly Election 2009 ===
2009 Maharashtra Legislative Assembly election : Baramati
Party	Candidate	Votes	%	±%
NCP	Ajit Pawar	128,544	68.26	▼0.81
Independent	Taware Ranjankumar Shankarrao	25,747	13.67	New
SS	Ad. Kale Rajendra Dattatraya	19,627	10.42	▼11.20
RSPS	Dasharath Nana Raut	6,042	3.21	▼0.41
BSP	Kaluram Vinayak Choudhari	6,037	3.21	▲0.40
Independent	Jarad Vitthal Dnyandev	1,262	0.67	New
Margin of victory		102,797	54.58	▲7.13
Turnout		188,334	64.82	▼1.85
Total valid votes		188,325		
Registered electors		290,528		▲38.80
NCP hold		Swing	▼0.81	

=== Assembly Election 2004 ===
2004 Maharashtra Legislative Assembly election : Baramati
Party	Candidate	Votes	%	±%
NCP	Ajit Pawar	96,302	69.07	▼0.65
SS	Popatrao Mansingrao Tupe	30,145	21.62	New
RSPS	Atole Sopanrao Tukaram	5,043	3.62	New
BSP	Kaluram Vinayak Choudhari	3,917	2.81	New
Independent	Shivaji Jaysing Kokare	2,740	1.97	New
Margin of victory		66,157	47.45	▲6.86
Turnout		139,555	66.67	▼10.41
Total valid votes		139,421		
Registered electors		209,320		▲23.87
NCP hold		Swing	▼0.65	

=== Assembly Election 1999 ===
1999 Maharashtra Legislative Assembly election : Baramati
Party	Candidate	Votes	%	±%
NCP	Ajit Pawar	86,507	69.72	New
Independent	Taware Chandrarao Krishnarao	36,141	29.13	New
ABS	Kakade Arunrao Bhagavanrao	765	0.62	New
Margin of victory		50,366	40.59	▼20.19
Turnout		130,243	77.08	▼4.16
Total valid votes		124,086		
Registered electors		168,978		▲4.19
NCP gain from INC		Swing	▼2.19	

=== Assembly Election 1995 ===
1995 Maharashtra Legislative Assembly election : Baramati
Party	Candidate	Votes	%	±%
INC	Ajit Pawar	91,493	71.91	▼18.52
Independent	Kakade Ratanrao Bhagwanrao	14,158	11.13	New
Independent	Bhagat Madhukar Jotiba	8,103	6.37	New
SS	Sunil Dattatraya Shinde	6,567	5.16	New
Independent	Masal Manikrao Sambhaji	1,828	1.44	New
Independent	Gavade Kisan Bapurao	1,602	1.26	New
Independent	Kokare Shivaji Sambhaji	1,050	0.83	New
Independent	Waghmode Rambhau Narayan	858	0.67	New
Margin of victory		77,335	60.78	▼21.07
Turnout		131,757	81.24	
Total valid votes		127,236		
Registered electors		162,185		
INC hold		Swing	▼18.52	

=== Assembly By-election 1991 ===
1991 Maharashtra Legislative Assembly by-election : Baramati
Party	Candidate	Votes	%	±%
INC	Ajit Pawar	96,032	90.43	▲3.54
BJP	K. H. Khanderao	9,117	8.59	New
Margin of victory		86,915	81.85	▲6.75
Total valid votes		106,194		
INC hold		Swing	▲3.54	

=== Assembly Election 1990 ===
1990 Maharashtra Legislative Assembly election : Baramati
Party	Candidate	Votes	%	±%
INC	Sharad Pawar	102,066	86.89	▲48.00
Independent	Chopade Marutrao Dhondiba	13,843	11.78	New
Margin of victory		88,223	75.10	▲55.33
Turnout		118,950	74.62	▲0.96
Total valid votes		117,472		
Registered electors		159,402		▲26.70
INC gain from IC(S)		Swing	▲28.23	

=== Assembly Election 1985 ===
1985 Maharashtra Legislative Assembly election : Baramati
Party	Candidate	Votes	%	±%
IC(S)	Sharad Pawar	53,545	58.66	New
INC	Kakade Shahajiraje Mugutrao	35,501	38.89	New
Independent	Kokare Hanumant Khanderao	892	0.98	New
Margin of victory		18,044	19.77	▼14.74
Turnout		92,674	73.66	▲2.65
Total valid votes		91,277		
Registered electors		125,809		▲6.55
IC(S) gain from INC(U)		Swing	▼8.14	

=== Assembly Election 1980 ===
1980 Maharashtra Legislative Assembly election : Baramati
Party	Candidate	Votes	%	±%
INC(U)	Sharad Pawar	54,919	66.80	New
INC(I)	Chopade Marutrao Dhondiba	26,550	32.30	New
Margin of victory		28,369	34.51	▲12.02
Turnout		83,846	71.01	▼9.39
Total valid votes		82,208		
Registered electors		118,074		▲11.76
INC(U) gain from INC		Swing	▲6.84	

=== Assembly Election 1978 ===
1978 Maharashtra Legislative Assembly election : Baramati
Party	Candidate	Votes	%	±%
INC	Sharad Pawar	49,685	59.96	▼15.54
JP	More Vijay Hanumantrao	31,047	37.47	New
Independent	Takawane Shivajirao Balwantrao	785	0.95	New
Independent	Gaikwad Arvind Bapurao	719	0.87	New
Independent	Chavan Bayaji Narayan	627	0.76	New
Margin of victory		18,638	22.49	▼34.24
Turnout		84,948	80.40	▲9.06
Total valid votes		82,863		
Registered electors		105,653		▲10.70
INC hold		Swing	▼15.54	

=== Assembly Election 1972 ===
1972 Maharashtra Legislative Assembly election : Baramati
Party	Candidate	Votes	%	±%
INC	Sharad Pawar	49,874	75.50	▲12.40
SSP	More Vijayrao Hanmantrao	12,401	18.77	New
RPI	Salave Dadu Phulaji	2,451	3.71	New
ABJS	Kale Arunrao Ramchandra	808	1.22	New
Independent	Sahebrao Kashinath Pawar	523	0.79	New
Margin of victory		37,473	56.73	▲26.51
Turnout		68,081	71.34	▼2.80
Total valid votes		66,057		
Registered electors		95,437		▲20.82
INC hold		Swing	▲12.40	

=== Assembly Election 1967 ===
1967 Maharashtra Legislative Assembly election : Baramati
Party	Candidate	Votes	%	±%
INC	Sharad Pawar	34,160	63.10	▲16.24
PWPI	Babalal Sahebrao Kakade Deshmukh	17,801	32.88	▲18.97
PSP	H. C. Naidu	1,706	3.15	▼14.49
Independent	J. N. Gavade	471	0.87	New
Margin of victory		16,359	30.22	▲1.00
Turnout		58,562	74.14	▲22.18
Total valid votes		54,138		
Registered electors		78,990		▲19.11
INC hold		Swing	▲16.24	

=== Assembly Election 1962 ===
1962 Maharashtra Legislative Assembly election : Baramati
Party	Candidate	Votes	%	±%
INC	Malatibai Madhavrao Shirole	14,751	46.86	▲10.03
PSP	Mansing Murlidhar Tule	5,553	17.64	New
PWPI	Jijaba Nanasaheb Gavade	4,378	13.91	▼19.90
Independent	Vithal Ramchandra Sonawale	3,512	11.16	New
Independent	Annasaheb Nanasaheb Bhapkar	1,459	4.64	New
Independent	Dattatray Piraji Lonkar	949	3.01	New
Independent	Baburao Pandurang Humbre	874	2.78	New
Margin of victory		9,198	29.22	▲15.92
Turnout		34,458	51.96	▼41.23
Total valid votes		31,476		
Registered electors		66,316		▼41.94
INC gain from PWPI		Swing	▲13.05	

=== Assembly Election 1957 ===
1957 Bombay State Legislative Assembly election : Baramati
Party	Candidate	Votes	%	±%
PWPI	Jagtap Nanasaheb Bapuji	35,990	33.81	▲12.86
SCF	Londhe Sambhaji Bandoba	31,248	29.36	▲27.16
INC	Kharat Ganpat Sambhaji	21,835	20.51	▼38.51
INC	Ingule Uddhayrao Laxman	17,364	16.31	▼42.71
Margin of victory		14,155	13.30	▼24.77
Turnout		106,437	93.19	▲34.55
Total valid votes		106,437		
Registered electors		114,215		▲119.93
PWPI gain from INC		Swing	▼25.21	

=== Assembly Election 1952 ===
1952 Bombay State Legislative Assembly election : Baramati
Party	Candidate	Votes	%	±%
INC	Mulik Gulabrao Dadasaheb	17,973	59.02	New
PWPI	Gagtap Nanashaheb Bapuji	6,380	20.95	New
Independent	Shelke Marutrao Bhaurao	3,836	12.60	New
Independent	Gite Balasaheb Patilbhuwa	1,592	5.23	New
SCF	Sonone Shirang Satva	670	2.20	New
Margin of victory		11,593	38.07	
Turnout		30,451	58.64	
Total valid votes		30,451		
Registered electors		51,932		
INC win (new seat)				

== See also ==
- Baramati
- List of constituencies of Maharashtra Vidhan Sabha
