= Baramati Lok Sabha constituency =

Lok Sabha constituency in Maharashtra

Coordinates: 18°9′22.65″N 74°34′49.04″E

Baramati
- Lok Sabha constituency
- Baramati Lok Sabha Constituency map

Constituency details
- Country: India
- Region: Western India
- State: Maharashtra
- District: Pune
- Assembly constituencies: Daund; Indapur; Baramati; Purandar; Bhor; Khadakwasala
- Established: 1952
- Total electors: 21,14,716
- Reservation: None

Member of Parliament
- 18th Lok Sabha
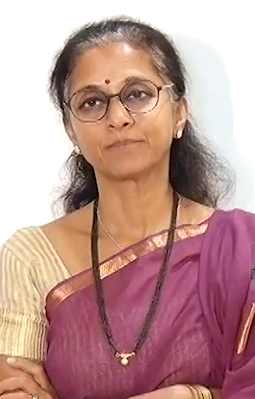
- Incumbent Supriya Sule
- Party: NCP-SP
- Alliance: INDIA
- Elected year: 2024
- Preceded by: Sharad Pawar

The Baramati Lok Sabha constituency is one of the 48 parliamentary constituencies in the state of Maharashtra, India. Located in the Pune district, it comprises six Vidhan Sabha (legislative assembly) segments: Daund, Indapur, Baramati, Purandar, Bhor, and Khadakwasala. The constituency has been a stronghold of the Nationalist Congress Party (NCP) and the Pawar family since the 1960s. Sharad Pawar, the founder of the NCP, represented the seat from 1996 to 2004. Since 2009, his daughter Supriya Sule has held the seat, winning consecutive elections in 2009, 2014, 2019, and 2024.

In the 2024 elections, Supriya Sule, representing the NCP-SP, faced a direct contest against her sister-in-law Sunetra Pawar from the NCP. Supriya Sule won the election with a significant margin.

== Vidhan Sabha segments ==
Presently, Baramati Lok Sabha constituency comprises six Vidhan Sabha (legislative assembly) segments. These segments are:

Constituency number	Name	Reserved for (SC/ST/None)	District	Party	2024 Lead
199	Daund	None	Pune	BJP	NCP-SP
200	Indapur	None	Pune	NCP	NCP-SP
201	Baramati	None	Pune	NCP	NCP-SP
202	Purandar	None	Pune	SHS	NCP-SP
203	Bhor	None	Pune	NCP	NCP-SP
211	Khadakwasala	None	Pune	BJP	NCP

== Members of Parliament ==
Year	Name	Party
1957	Keshavrao Jedhe	Indian National Congress
1960^	Gulabrao Jedhe	Indian National Congress
1962	Gulabrao Jedhe	Indian National Congress
1967	Tulsidas Jadhav	Indian National Congress
1971	R.K.Khadilkar	Indian National Congress
1977	Sambhajirao Kakade	Janata Party
1980	Shankarrao Bajirao Patil	Indian National Congress (I)
1984	Sharad Pawar	Indian Congress (Socialist)
1985^	Sambhajirao Kakade	Janata Party
1989	Shankarrao Bajirao Patil	Indian National Congress
1991	Ajit Pawar	Indian National Congress
1991^	Sharad Pawar	Indian National Congress
1994^	Bapusaheb Thite	Indian National Congress
1996	Sharad Pawar	Indian National Congress
1998	Sharad Pawar	Indian National Congress
1999	Sharad Pawar	Nationalist Congress Party
2004	Sharad Pawar	Nationalist Congress Party
2009	Supriya Sule	Nationalist Congress Party
2014	Supriya Sule	Nationalist Congress Party
2019	Supriya Sule	Nationalist Congress Party
2024	Supriya Sule	Nationalist Congress Party – Sharadchandra Pawar

== Election results ==
Vote share of Winning candidates
2024	51.85%
2019	52.63%
2014	48.88%
2009	66.46%
2004	71.03%
1999	57.79%
1998	65.81%
1996	57.23%
1994 by-poll	0.00%
1991 by-poll	88.64%
1991	75.31%
1989	58.41%
1985 by-poll	54.93%
1984	60.63%
1980	47.46%
1977	54.09%
1971	71.59%
1967	62.25%
1962	54.61%
1960 by-poll	58.72%
1957	42.89%

=== 2024 ===
2024 Indian general election: Baramati
Party	Candidate	Votes	%	±%
NCP-SP	Supriya Sule	732,312	51.85	
NCP	Sunetra Pawar	573,979	40.64	▼11.99
IND	Mahesh Sitaram Bhagwat	15,663	1.11	
BSP	Priyadarshani Kokare	10,030	0.71	▲0.18
NOTA	None of the Above	9,151	0.65	▲0.05
IND	24 Independent Candidates	41,155	2.91	
OTH	9 Other Party Candidates	15,142	1.07	
Majority		158,333	11.20	▼0.74
Turnout		1,414,034	59.54	▼2.28
NCP-SP gain from NCP		Swing		

=== 2019 ===
2019 Indian general election: Baramati
Party	Candidate	Votes	%	±%
NCP	Supriya Sule	686,714	52.63	▲3.75
BJP	Kanchan Rahul Kool	530,940	40.69	
VBA	Padalkar Navanath	44,134	3.38	
NOTA	None of the Above	7,868	0.60	▼0.73
BSP	Mangesh Nilkanth Vanshiv	6,882	0.53	▼1.80
IND	10 Independent Candidates	18,317	1.40	
OTH	4 Other Party Candidates	9,873	0.76	
Majority		155,774	11.94	▲5.41
Turnout		1,307,318	61.82	▲3.01
NCP hold		Swing		

=== 2014 ===
2014 Indian general election: Baramati
Party	Candidate	Votes	%	±%
NCP	Supriya Sule	521,562	48.88	▼17.58
RSPS	Mahadev Jankar	451,843	42.35	▲40.32
AAP	Suresh Khopade	26,396	2.47	
BSP	Chaudhari Kaluram Vinayak	24,908	2.33	▼1.74
NOTA	None of the Above	14,216	1.33	
JD(S)	Tatyasaheb Sitaram Tele	8,811	0.83	
BMP	Ravindra Takale	7,845	0.74	
IND	Kokare Shivaji Jaysing	4,739	0.44	
IND	Mahadik Pralhad Dagadu	2,891	0.27	
IND	Sureshdada Baburao Veer	3,345	0.31	
Majority		69,719	6.53	▼39.36
Turnout		1,066,556	58.81	▲12.74
NCP hold		Swing		

=== 2009 ===
2009 Indian general election: Baramati
Party	Candidate	Votes	%	±%
NCP	Supriya Sule	487,827	66.46	▼4.57
BJP	Kanta Nalawade	150,996	20.57	▼3.12
BSP	Kudalepatil Vivek Anant	29,864	4.07	▲2.17
RSPS	Sampat Maruti Takale	14,912	2.03	▼1.35
IND	10 Independent Candidates	40,821	5.56	
OTH	3 Other Party Candidates	9,628	1.31	
Majority		336,831	45.89	▼1.45
Turnout		734,048	46.07	▼2.27
NCP hold		Swing		

=== 2004 ===
2004 Indian general election: Baramati
Party	Candidate	Votes	%	±%
NCP	Sharad Pawar	634,555	71.03	▲13.24
BJP	Prithviraj Sahebrao Jachak	211,580	23.69	▼0.29
RSPS	Kolekar Balasaheb Bapurao	30,230	3.38	
BSP	Vishwakarma Pralhad Rambich	16,966	1.90	
Majority		422,975	47.34	▲13.53
Turnout		893,331	48.34	▼14.78
NCP hold		Swing		

=== 1999 ===
1999 Indian general election: Baramati
Party	Candidate	Votes	%	±%
NCP	Sharad Pawar	510,928	57.79	
BJP	Dr. Pratibha Lokhande	212,025	23.98	▼8.47
INC	Prof. Ramkrishna More	146,641	16.59	▼49.22
ABS	Hira Mohan Palande	14,514	1.64	
Majority		298,903	33.81	▲0.45
Turnout		923,036	63.12	▲6.21
NCP gain from INC		Swing		

=== 1998 ===
1998 Indian general election: Baramati
Party	Candidate	Votes	%	±%
INC	Sharad Pawar	529,059	65.81	▲8.58
BJP	Kakade Viraj Babulal	260,875	32.45	
IND	5 Independent Candidates	7,387	0.92	
OTH	2 Other Party Candidates	6,537	0.81	
Majority		268,184	33.36	▲11.88
Turnout		819,040	56.91	▲2.41
INC hold		Swing		

=== 1996 ===
1996 Indian general election: Baramati
Party	Candidate	Votes	%	±%
INC	Sharad Pawar	427,589	57.23	
IND	Shankarrao Bajirao Patil	267,088	35.75	
IND	Godase Subhash Narhar	9,902	1.33	
IND	16 Independent Candidates	32,757	4.38	
OTH	2 Other Party Candidates	9,812	1.31	
Majority		160,501	21.48	
Turnout		762,533	54.50	
INC hold		Swing		

=== 1994 by-election ===
Sharad Pawar resigned as a Member of Parliament and as Union Defence Minister to return to state politics and assume office as Chief Minister of Maharashtra.

1994 Indian parliamentary by-election: Baramati
Party	Candidate	Votes	%	±%
INC	Baba Saheb Thide			
Majority				
Turnout				
INC hold		Swing		

Note: Complete information is not available.

=== 1991 by-election ===
Ajit Pawar won a Lok Sabha seat but resigned soon after to facilitate Sharad Pawar's entry into the government of P. V. Narasimha Rao as Union Defence Minister.

Sharad Pawar resigned as the Baramati MLA to contest the Lok Sabha by-election, while Ajit Pawar later contested the vacant Baramati Assembly seat—effectively swapping their elected positions.

1991 Indian parliamentary by-election: Baramati
Party	Candidate	Votes	%	±%
INC	Sharad Pawar	508,179	88.64	▲13.33
BJP	P. Lokhande	48,520	8.46	▼8.94
IND	9 Independent Candidates	9,311	1.62	
OTH	3 Other Party Candidates	7,285	1.27	
Majority		459,659	80.18	▲22.27
Turnout		573,295		
INC hold		Swing		

=== 1991 ===
1991 Indian general election: Baramati
Party	Candidate	Votes	%	±%
INC	Ajit Pawar	437,293	75.31	▲16.90
BJP	Pratibha Lokhande	101,030	17.40	▲10.07
JD	Tapkir Sarjerao Bhikaram	30,783	5.30	▼27.12
IND	7 Independent Candidates	7,989	1.38	
OTH	2 Other Party Candidates	3,528	0.61	
Majority		336,263	57.91	▲31.92
Turnout		591,795	46.91	▼8.40
INC hold		Swing		

=== 1989 ===
1989 Indian general election: Baramati
Party	Candidate	Votes	%	±%
INC	Shankarrao Bajirao Patil	384,513	58.41	▲18.33
JD	Sambhajirao Kakade	213,421	32.42	
BJP	Kokare Hanumant Khanderao	48,271	7.33	
RPI	Badekar Bhujang Waman	2,791	0.42	
BSP	Abhang Sitaram Dnyaneshwar	697	0.11	
IND	7 Independent Candidates	8,584	1.31	
Majority		171,092	25.99	▲11.14
Turnout		673,538	55.31	
INC gain from JP		Swing		

=== 1985 by-election ===
1985 Indian parliamentary by-election: Baramati
Party	Candidate	Votes	%	±%
JP	K. S. Sahebrao	179,507	54.93	
INC	P. S. Bajirao	130,955	40.08	▲3.01
LKD	V. P. Gujarathi	9,648	2.95	
IND	G. C. Chhogalal	2,620	0.80	
IND	B. B. Waman	2,018	0.62	
IND	M. Y. A. Gafar	1,040	0.32	
IND	A. M. Aba	979	0.30	
Majority		48,552	14.85	▼8.71
Turnout		326,767		
JP gain from IC(S)		Swing		

=== 1984 ===
1984 Indian general election: Baramati
Party	Candidate	Votes	%	±%
IC(S)	Sharad Pawar	361,618	60.63	
INC	Shankarrao Bajirao Patil	221,086	37.07	▼10.39
IND	7 Independent Candidates	13,703	2.30	
Majority		140,532	23.56	▲4.09
Turnout		608,149	70.75	▲11.44
IC(S) gain from INC(I)		Swing		

=== 1980 ===
1980 Indian general election: Baramati
Party	Candidate	Votes	%	±%
INC(I)	Shankarrao Bajirao Patil	209,300	47.46	▲1.55
JP	Sambhajirao Kakade	123,432	27.99	▼26.10
INC(U)	Mohan Dharia	94,692	21.47	
BSP	Jadhav Magan Nivruti	1,542	0.35	
IND	5 Independent Candidates	12,027	2.73	
Majority		85,868	19.47	▲11.29
Turnout		454,323	59.31	▼2.21
INC(I) gain from JP		Swing		

=== 1977 ===
1977 Indian general election: Baramati
Party	Candidate	Votes	%	±%
JP	Sambhajirao Kakade	203,148	54.09	
INC	Gadgil Vithal Narhar	172,448	45.91	▼25.68
Majority		30,700	8.18	▼42.33
Turnout		388,962	61.52	▲6.09
JP gain from INC		Swing		

=== 1971 ===
1971 Indian general election: Baramati
Party	Candidate	Votes	%	±%
INC	Raghunath Keshav Khadilkar	185,637	71.59	▲9.34
IND	Ramrao Sahebrao Kakade	54,677	21.08	
INC(O)	Jayasing Ganpat Sasane	9,815	3.78	
IND	Abasaheb Krishnarao Shitole	4,211	1.62	
IND	Maniklal Tulajaram Shah	2,564	0.99	
PWPI	Balvant Dattatraya Killedar	2,418	0.93	
Majority		130,960	50.51	▲15.13
Turnout		267,635	55.43	▼7.73
INC hold		Swing		

=== 1967 ===
1967 Indian general election: Baramati
Party	Candidate	Votes	%	±%
INC	Tulsidas Jadhav	166,392	62.25	▲7.64
RPI	B. D. Kamble	71,819	26.87	
IND	V. R. Sonawale	15,344	5.74	
IND	P. N. Patil	13,743	5.14	
Majority		94,573	35.38	▲3.72
Turnout		283,908	63.16	▲11.69
INC hold		Swing		

=== 1962 ===
1962 Indian general election: Baramati
Party	Candidate	Votes	%	±%
INC	Keshavrao Jedhe	106,244	54.61	▼4.11
PSP	Parashuram Chunilal Chordia	44,657	22.95	
PWPI	Nanasaheb Bapuji Jagtap	38,003	19.53	▼18.74
IND	Tukaram Maanku Sonavane	5,648	2.90	
Majority		61,587	31.66	▲11.21
Turnout		202,813	51.47	
INC hold		Swing		

=== 1960 by-election ===
1960 Indian parliamentary by-elections: Baramati
Party	Candidate	Votes	%	±%
INC	G. K. Jedhe	82,839	58.72	▲15.83
PWPI	V. G. Pawar	53,985	38.27	
IND	K. G. Kataria	4,252	3.01	
Majority		28,854	20.45	▲8.16
Turnout		141,076		
INC hold		Swing		

=== 1957 ===
1957 Indian general election: Baramati
Party	Candidate	Votes	%	±%
INC	Keshavrao Jedhe	63,364	42.89	
IND	Shitole Abasaheb Krishnarao	45,200	30.60	
IND	Tendulkar Malatibai Madhav	39,162	26.51	
Majority		18,164	12.29	
Turnout		147,726	44.13	
INC win (new seat)				

== See also ==
- Pune district
- List of constituencies of the Lok Sabha

Lok Sabha
Preceded by Lucknow	Constituency represented by the leader of the opposition 1997 – 1999	Succeeded by Amethi
