= Sharad Pawar =

Indian politician

Sharadchandra Pawar
- Pawar in April 2013

Member of Parliament, Rajya Sabha
- Incumbent
- Assumed office 3 April 2014
- Preceded by: Y. P. Trivedi
- Constituency: Maharashtra

President of the Nationalist Congress Party (Sharadchandra Pawar)
- Incumbent
- Assumed office 8 February 2024
- Preceded by: Office established

9th President of the International Cricket Council (ICC)
- In office 2010–2012
- Preceded by: David Morgan
- Succeeded by: Alan Isaac

28th Union Minister of Agriculture
- In office 23 May 2004 – 26 May 2014
- Prime Minister: Manmohan Singh
- Preceded by: Rajnath Singh
- Succeeded by: Radha Mohan Singh

9th Union Minister of Consumer Affairs, Food and Public Distribution
- In office 22 May 2004 – 19 January 2011
- Prime Minister: Manmohan Singh
- Preceded by: Sharad Yadav
- Succeeded by: K. V. Thomas

9th Leader of the Opposition in Lok Sabha
- In office 19 March 1998 – 26 April 1999
- Prime Minister: Atal Bihari Vajpayee
- Speaker: G. M. C. Balayogi
- Preceded by: Atal Bihari Vajpayee
- Succeeded by: Sonia Gandhi

15th Union Minister of Defence
- In office 26 June 1991 – 6 March 1993
- Prime Minister: P. V. Narasimha Rao
- Preceded by: Chandra Shekhar
- Succeeded by: P. V. Narasimha Rao

Member of Parliament, Lok Sabha
- In office 16 May 2009 – 3 April 2014
- Preceded by: Constituency established
- Succeeded by: Vijaysinh Mohite–Patil
- Constituency: Madha, Maharashtra
- In office 10 May 1996 – 16 May 2009
- Preceded by: Bapusaheb Thite
- Succeeded by: Supriya Sule
- Constituency: Baramati, Maharashtra
- In office 18 November 1991 – 6 March 1993
- Preceded by: Ajit Pawar
- Succeeded by: Bapusaheb Thite
- Constituency: Baramati, Maharashtra
- In office 31 December 1984 – March 1985
- Preceded by: Shankarrao Bajirao Patil
- Succeeded by: Sambhajirao Kakade
- Constituency: Baramati, Maharashtra

7th Chief Minister of Maharashtra
- In office 6 March 1993 – 14 March 1995
- Preceded by: Sudhakarrao Naik
- Succeeded by: Manohar Joshi
- In office 26 June 1988 – 25 June 1991
- Preceded by: Shankarrao Chavan
- Succeeded by: Sudhakarrao Naik
- In office 18 July 1978 – 17 February 1980
- Preceded by: Vasantdada Patil
- Succeeded by: A. R. Antulay

Member of Maharashtra Legislative Assembly
- In office February 1967 – January 1985
- Preceded by: Malatibai Madhavrao Shirole
- Succeeded by: Vacant
- Constituency: Baramati
- In office March 1985 – June 1991
- Preceded by: Vacant
- Succeeded by: Ajit Pawar
- Constituency: Baramati

Personal details
- Born: Sharadchandra Govindrao Pawar; 12 December 1940 (age 85) Baramati, Bombay Province, then part of British India (present-day Maharashtra, India)
- Party: Nationalist Congress Party (Sharadchandra Pawar) (2024–present)
- Other political affiliations: Nationalist Congress Party (1999–2024); Indian National Congress (1958–1999)
- Spouse: Pratibhatai Pawar (m. 1967)
- Relations: Ajit Pawar (nephew); Rohit Rajendra Pawar (grand-nephew)
- Children: Supriya Sule (daughter)
- Profession: Politician; cricket administrator
- Website: sharadpawar.com
- As of 29 October, 2010

Sharadchandra Govindrao Pawar (Note: Marathi: शरदचन्द्र गोविन्दराव पवार, romanized: Śaradacandra Govindarāva Pavāra) (born 12 December 1940) is an Indian politician who has served as a Member of Parliament, Rajya Sabha since 2014. Prior to 2014 he served as a member of Lok Sabha, as a member of the Nationalist Congress Party (NCP). He has served four terms as the Chief Minister of Maharashtra including (1990–1991): Following the 1990 assembly elections, he continued his leadership as Chief Minister, and held cabinet positions in the Union Council of Ministers, including the Minister of Defence under P. V. Narasimha Rao government and the Minister of Agriculture under Manmohan Singh government. In 1999, he founded the NCP following a split from the Indian National Congress. In July 2023, following a split within the NCP, he now leads the Sharadchandra Pawar faction. Pawar has been involved in several coalition governments and political alliances in Maharashtra.

Born in Baramati, Maharashtra, Sharadchandra is the patriarch of the Pawar family, which includes several political figures, including his daughter Supriya Sule, nephew Ajit Pawar (former Deputy CM of Maharashtra), and grandnephew Rohit Rajendra Pawar.

Pawar served as the President of the Board of Control for Cricket in India (BCCI) from 2005 to 2008 and of the International Cricket Council (ICC) from 2010 to 2012. He also headed the Mumbai Cricket Association from October 2013 to January 2017. He received the Padma Vibhushan, India's second-highest civilian honour, in 2017.

== Personal life and family ==
Sharad Pawar is one of ten children born to Govindrao and Shardabai Pawar, a middle-class agricultural family in Baramati. He completed his secondary education at Maharashtra Education Society's High School receiving a Bachelor's degree in Commerce from the Brihan Maharashtra College of Commerce, Pune.

Sharad Pawar completed his education up to the 10th standard (SSC) under the Maharashtra State Board of Secondary and Higher Secondary Education at Maharashtra Education Society's High School in Baramati.

Pawar married Pratibhatai Pawar (née Shinde), daughter of cricketer Sadashiv Shinde, in 1967. Their daughter, Supriya Sule, represents the Baramati constituency in the 18th Lok Sabha and serves as the working president of the Nationalist Congress Party.

Several members of the Pawar family have held political roles within the government of Maharashtra. The family has two Members of Parliament and two Members of the state Legislative Assembly. Among them, Ajit Pawar was the deputy Chief Minister of Maharashtra.

Pratap Pawar (younger brother), is chairman and managing director of the Marathi daily newspaper Sakal. Pawar’s nephew, Ajit Pawar, served as the Deputy Chief Minister of Maharashtra a record six times. He died in a plane crash in Baramati on 28 January 2026. Following Ajit Pawar's death, his widow and Rajya Sabha MP, Sunetra Pawar, was sworn in as the Deputy Chief Minister of Maharashtra on 31 January 2026. Rohit Rajendra Pawar, Pawar's grand-nephew, represents the Karjat Jamkhed Assembly constituency in the Maharashtra Vidhan Sabha.

== Political career ==
=== Early career ===
Pawar began his political career in 1956, organising a protest march for Goan Independence in Pravaranagar. Although his older lawyer brother belonged to the Peasants and Workers Party, Pawar preferred the Congress Party and joined the Youth Congress in 1958. He later became the president of the Poona district (now Pune district) Youth Congress in 1962, and by 1964 had become one of two secretaries of the Maharashtra Youth Congress.

=== 1967–1978 ===
In 1967, Pawar was nominated as the candidate for the Baramati constituency of the Maharashtra Legislative Assembly over more established members by the undivided Congress Party. He won the election and represented the constituency from 1967 to 1990. In 1969, when the Congress Party split after the 1969 Indian presidential election, he opted for the Congress (R) faction led by Prime Minister Indira Gandhi, along with his mentor Yashwantrao Chavan.

As the MLA from Baramati in the early 1970s, he oversaw the building of percolation tanks during a severe drought in Maharashtra. He was also heavily involved in the politics of the local cooperative sugar mills and other member-run cooperative societies.

=== 1978-1987 ===
In the 1977 Lok Sabha elections, the Congress Party, under Indira Gandhi, lost power to the Janata Alliance. Taking responsibility for the loss of a large number of seats in Maharashtra, Chief Minister Shankarrao Chavan resigned shortly afterwards and was replaced by Vasantdada Patil. Later that year, the Congress Party split again, with Pawar's mentor, Yashwantrao Chavan, joining one faction, Congress (U), and Indira Gandhi leading her faction, Congress (I). Pawar joined the Congress (U) faction. In the state assembly elections held early in 1978, the two Congress parties ran separately but then allied to keep power for Vasantdada Patil. This was in response to the rise and success of the Janata Party, which emerged as the minority government after the election. Pawar served as Minister of Industry and Labour under the Patil government.

In July 1978, Pawar broke away from the Congress (U) party to form a coalition government with the Janata Party. In the process, at the age of 38, he became the youngest Chief Minister of Maharashtra. This Progressive Democratic Front (PDF) government was dismissed in February 1980, following Indira Gandhi's return to power.

In the 1980 elections, Congress (I) won the majority in the state assembly, and A.R. Antulay took over as Chief Minister of Maharashtra. Pawar took over the presidency of his own Congress (S) party in 1983. For the first time, he won the Lok Sabha election from the Baramati parliamentary constituency in 1984. He also won the state assembly election of March 1985 from Baramati and preferred to return to state politics, resigning his Lok Sabha seat. Congress (S) won 54 seats out of 288 in the state assembly, and Pawar became the leader of the opposition of the Progressive Democratic Front coalition, which included the BJP, PWP, and the Janata Party.

=== 1987–1990 ===
In 1987 he returned to Congress (I) assisting the rise of the Shiv Sena during that period. At the time, Pawar stated that his decision was driven by "the need to save the Congress Culture in Maharashtra". In June 1988, Pawar was chosen to replace Chavan as the Chief Minister. Pawar had the task of checking the rise of the Shiv Sena in state politics, which was a potential challenge to the dominance of the Congress in the state. In the 1989 Lok Sabha elections, Congress won 28 seats out of 48 in Maharashtra.

=== Early 1990s ===
Following the assassination of former Prime Minister Rajiv Gandhi during his 1991 election campaign, the Congress Parliamentary Party (party MPs) unanimously elected P.V. Narasimha Rao as their leader, who was sworn in as prime minister on 21 June 1991. Rao named Pawar as the defence minister, a position he held until March 1993. After Pawar's successor in Maharashtra, Sudhakarrao Naik, stepped down following the Bombay riots, Pawar was sworn in again as chief minister for his fourth term on 6 March 1993. Almost immediately, Mumbai experienced a series of bomb blasts on 12 March 1993. Pawar's response to the blasts attracted controversy. In a 2006 speech, Pawar stated that he had reported thirteen blasts instead of twelve during the 1993 bombings to include a Muslim-majority area, citing a desire to prevent communal tension. He attempted to justify this deception by claiming that it was a move to prevent communal riots, by falsely portraying that both the Hindu and Muslim communities in the city had been adversely affected. He additionally admitted to lying about evidence recovered and misleading people into believing that it pointed to the Tamil Tigers as possible suspects.

=== Mid-to-late 1990s ===
In 1993, the Deputy Commissioner of the Brihanmumbai Municipal Corporation, G. R. Khairnar, made a series of accusations against Pawar for being involved in corruption and protecting criminals. Though Khairnar could not produce any evidence in support of his claims, it inevitably affected Pawar's popularity. Notable social worker Anna Hazare started a fast-unto-death to demand the expulsion of 12 officers of the Maharashtra state forest department who had been accused of corruption. The opposition parties accused Pawar's government of trying to shield the corrupt officers.

The 1994 Gowari stampede occurred at Nagpur, during the winter session of the state assembly, and killed 114 people. Nagpur Police were trying to disperse almost 50,000 Gowari and Vanjari protesters using baton charges, but the police created panic and triggered a stampede amongst protesters. Allegations were made that the mishap occurred because the welfare minister, Madhukarrao Pichad, did not meet with the delegation of the Vanjari people in time. Though Pichad, accepting responsibility for the mishap, stepped down, this incident was another setback to Pawar's government.

In 1995 Pawar stepped down following the outcome of the elections to the Vidhan Sabha. However after the 1996 Sabha elections, Pawar served as Leader of the Opposition in the state assembly. In the 1996 general elections, Pawar won the Baramati seat in the Lok Sabha and left the state assembly.

In June 1997, Pawar unsuccessfully challenged Sitaram Kesri for the post of President of the Indian National Congress. In the mid-term parliamentary elections of 1998, Pawar won his constituency, Baramati, and also led Congress to a win by a large majority of Maharashtra Lok Sabha constituencies. Congress was aligned with the Republican Party of India (Athvale) and the Samajwadi Party for the Lok Sabha elections in Maharashtra. The Congress party won 33 Lok Sabha seats outright, and the allied Republican Party of India won 4 more, for a total of 37 out of 48 in the state. Pawar served as Leader of the Opposition in the 12th Lok Sabha.

=== Formation of the Nationalist Congress Party ===
In 1999, after the 12th Lok Sabha was dissolved and elections to the 13th Lok Sabha were called, Pawar, P. A. Sangma, and Tariq Anwar were expelled following their demand that a native-born as the prime ministerial candidate. In response, Pawar and Sangma founded the Nationalist Congress Party in June 1999. Despite the falling out, the new party aligned with the Congress party to form a coalition government in Maharashtra after the 1999 state assembly elections to prevent the Shiv Sena-BJP combine from returning to power.

=== Minister of Agriculture in UPA government ===
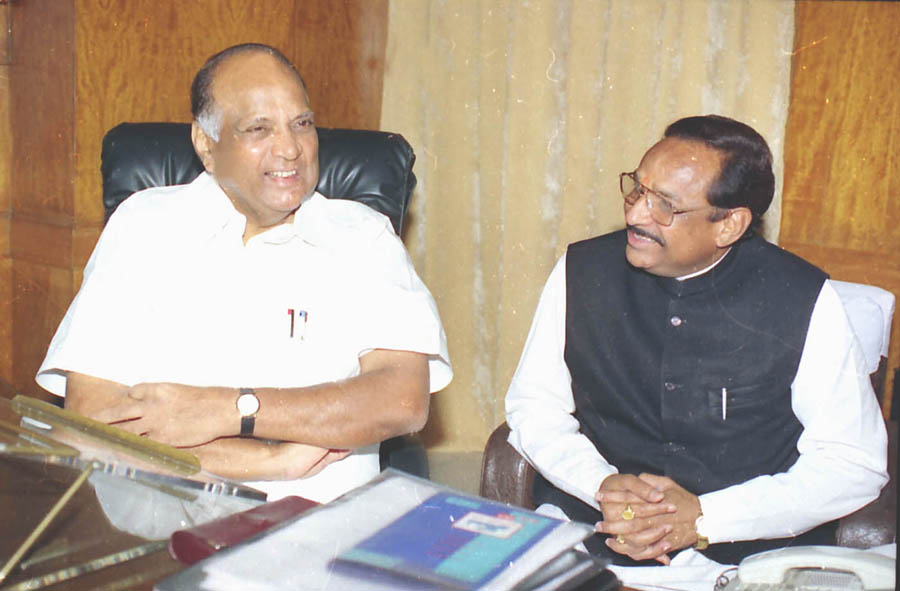
Pawar assumes the charge of Union Minister for Agriculture, Food & Civil Supplies, Consumer Affairs and Public Distribution in New Delhi on 24 May 2004

After the 2004 Lok Sabha elections, Pawar joined the United Progressive Alliance (UPA) government headed by Prime Minister Manmohan Singh as the Minister of Agriculture. He retained his portfolio when the UPA coalition government was re-elected in 2009.

==== Wheat imports ====
In 2007, the BJP asked for Pawar's resignation after alleging he was involved in a multi-crore Indian rupee (INR) scam involving wheat imports. In May 2007, a tender floated by the Food Corporation of India (FCI) for the procurement of wheat was cancelled when the lowest bid received was for US$263/ton. The government subsequently allowed private traders to purchase wheat directly from farmers that year, resulting in a paucity of wheat to stock FCI granaries. By July 2007, the shortage at FCI had become large enough to require importing wheat at a much higher price of 320–360 USD/ton. Taking advantage of this, traders who had purchased wheat at 900 INR/ton, were now offering the same to FCI at 1,300 INR/ton.

During his term as Agriculture minister Pawar faced repeated criticism for allegedly contributing to rising prices. He was questioned over 2007 import of substantial wheat, accused in 2009 of influencing a sharp rise in sugar prices to benefit certain traders and blamed during 2009-2010 for increasing costs of key products like wheat, sugar and beans.

==== Farmer suicides ====
Since the 1990s, India has witnessed a high number of farmer suicides-over 10,000 each year, totalling more than 200,000 between 1997 and 2010. In 2006, as the Minister of Agriculture, Pawar was criticised for downplaying the rate of farmer suicide in the country. However, he claimed at that time that his department was taking the necessary steps to reduce the numbers. His ministry initiated a series of government inquiries to look into the causes of farmers' suicides in 2012. In 2013, Pawar admitted that the suicides were a serious issue with many factors being responsible, and he said the government was increasing investment in agriculture and raising the minimum prices of crops to increase farmers' income.

==== Promotion of endosulfan ====
Despite its known negative health effects, Pawar remarked that endosulfan has not yet proved dangerous. This remark prompted activist Dr Vandana Shiva to call him a corrupt minister.

==== Other issues ====
In 2012, Pawar gave up the chairmanship of the Empowered Group of Ministers investigating the 2G spectrum case, days after his appointment by the prime minister, fearing that his association with the decision-making process would drag him into the 2G Spectrum controversy. In 2011, he resigned from the committee that was reviewing the draft of the anti-corruption Lokpal bill after his involvement was criticised by the anti-corruption campaigner, Anna Hazare.

=== Career since 2014 ===
In January 2012, Pawar announced that he would not contest the 2014 Lok Sabha elections, to make way for younger leadership. Currently, he is a member of the Rajya Sabha. He was elected to the body in April 2014 for a six-year term. He lost his ministerial position after the BJP-led NDA defeated the ruling UPA government, in which Pawar was the minister of agriculture, in the 2014 general elections. Pawar's NCP also lost power in Maharashtra after the 2014 assembly elections. The BJP won a plurality of seats in the new assembly and initially formed a minority government with outside support from the NCP. The BJP's estranged ally, the Shiv Sena, later joined the BJP-led government, and that government then did not need the support of the NCP. In May 2017, Pawar ruled out being a candidate for the June 2017 Indian presidential election.

In the 2019 Lok Sabha elections, Pawar's NCP and the Congress party had a seat-sharing arrangement. Similarly, despite ideological differences, the BJP and the Shiv Sena once again contested the elections together under the National Democratic Alliance (NDA) banner. The election resulted in a landslide victory for Narendra Modi's BJP. Out of the 48 seats in Maharashtra, the Congress party won only one seat in the state, whereas the NCP won five seats from its stronghold of western Maharashtra.

The 2019 Lok Sabha elections were followed by elections to the Vidhan Sabha in October 2019. Predictions for the state's ruling BJP–Shiv Sena alliance to win by a large margin led to a steady stream of defections from the NCP to the ruling alliance. Pawar campaigned for the NCP-Congress alliance during the 2019 Maharashtra assembly elections, during which the alliance increased its seat count compared to the previous election. Against predictions, the actual voting left the ruling alliance with fewer seats than in 2014. Differences between the Shiv Sena and the BJP led to a month of political drama, with Pawar and his family playing a pivotal role. The drama ended with the NCP returning to power on 28 November 2019, as part of a coalition between Shiv Sena, Congress, and the NCP, led by the Shiv Sena chief, Uddhav Thackeray, as the new chief minister of Maharashtra.

In June 2020, Pawar was re-elected to the Rajya Sabha.

Sharad Pawar, the founder and chief of the NCP since 1999, announced his decision to step down from his post and also his unwillingness to contest elections in the future, at the launch of the second edition of his political memoirs 'Lok Maze Sangati' ('People Accompany Me'). Sharad Pawar has had a long period of public life from 1 May 1958 to 1 May 2023.

Sharad Pawar withdrew his decision to step down as national leader of the National Congress Party, citing the "strong sentiments" his resignation had evoked among party workers and leaders across the country. The octogenarian leader clarified that he would focus on assigning new responsibilities through organisational changes and on developing new leadership.

=== 2023 Ajit Pawar's rebellion ===
In July 2023, Ajit Pawar rebelled against Sharad Pawar, joined the ruling BJP-Shiv Sena government, and took oath as Deputy Chief Minister of Maharashtra. A majority of NCP's sitting MLAs deserted the party in support of Ajit Pawar. He claimed to the Election Commission that he was the president of the NCP. Later, in his followers' first public meeting, he claimed ownership over the party, including both its name and election symbol. This rebellion resulted in a tussle in the party between those who stayed loyal to Sharad Pawar and those who supported Ajit Pawar, similar to the 2022 Shiv Sena political crisis. In 2024, he launched the Sharad Pawar Inspire Fellowship for agriculture graduates. Initially, in late 2024, Pawar, while addressing a meeting in Baramati, stated that he might not seek re‑election to the Rajya Sabha when his term ended in April 2026. However, to the contrary, he contested the 2026 Rajya Sabha elections and was re-elected unopposed to the Rajya Sabha for a third consecutive term.

=== Member of the coordination committee of the Indian National Developmental Inclusive Alliance ===
Pawar has been appointed a member of the Coordination Committee of the Indian National Developmental Inclusive Alliance at its Mumbai convention on 1 September 2023. The coordination committee will decide the national agenda, common campaign issues and common program of the country's main opposition alliance (I.N.D.I.A.).

== Electoral performance ==
Election candidature history
Election	Year	Party	Constituency	Opponent		Result	Margin
Maharashtra Legislative Assembly	1967	INC	Baramati	PWPI	B.S. Kakade	Won	N/A
Maharashtra Legislative Assembly	1972	INC	Baramati	SSP	Vijay Hanumantrao More	Won	N/A
Maharashtra Legislative Assembly	1978	INC	Baramati	JP	Vijay Hanumantrao More	Won	18,638
Maharashtra Legislative Assembly	1980	INC(U)	Baramati	INC(I)	Marutrao Dhondiba Chopade	Won	28,369
Maharashtra Legislative Assembly	1985	IC(S)	Baramati	INC	Shahajiraje Mugutrao Kakade	Won	18,044
Maharashtra Legislative Assembly	1990	INC	Baramati	IND	Marutrao Dhondiba Chopade	Won	88,223
Loksabha	1984	IC(S)	Baramati	INC	Shankarrao Bajirao Patil	Won	140,532
Loksabha	1991^	INC	Baramati	BJP	Dr. Pratibha Lokhande	Won	4,59,659
Loksabha	1996	INC	Baramati	IND	Shankarrao Bajirao Patil	Won	160,501
Loksabha	1998	INC	Baramati	BJP	Viraj Babulal Kakade	Won	268,184
Loksabha	1999	NCP	Baramati	BJP	Dr. Pratibha Lokhande	Won	298,903
Loksabha	2004	NCP	Baramati	BJP	Prithviraj Sahebrao Jachak	Won	422,975
Loksabha	2009	NCP	Madha	BJP	Subhash Deshmukh	Won	314,459
Rajyasabha	2014	NCP	Maharashtra			Won	-
Rajyasabha	2020	NCP	Maharashtra			Won	-
Rajyasabha	2026	NCP-SP	Maharashtra			Won	-

== Sports administration ==
Pawar has held leadership roles in several sports organizations, including:

- Mumbai Cricket Association
- Maharashtra Wrestling Association, President 1982-2022.
- Maharashtra Kabbadi Association
- Maharashtra Kho Kho Association
- Maharashtra Olympics Association
- Board of Control for Cricket in India, President 2005–2008
- International Cricket Council Vice President
- International Cricket Council President

== Educational institutions ==
In 1972, Pawar founded Vidya Pratishthan. The organization operates schools and colleges specializing in information technology and biotechnology in Baramati and other locations. Pawar is associated with the Hon. Sharad Pawar Public School, under the Shree Gurudatta Education Society; Sharad Pawar International School, Pune and the Sharad Pawar Cricket Academy, near Mumbai. Pawar is the current president of the century-old educational organisation Rayat Shikshan Sanstha.

== Controversies ==
=== Criminal links ===
In 1992–93, then-Maharashtra Chief Minister Sudhakarrao Naik made a statement that the state leader of the Indian National Congress party and erstwhile-Chief Minister Pawar had asked him to "go easy on Pappu Kalani", a well-known criminal turned politician. Shiv Sena chief, Bal Thackeray, later concurred with these allegations. Further, Chief Minister Naik also alleged that it was possible that Kalani and Hitendra Thakur, another criminal-turned-politician from Virar, had been given tickets to the contest election for the Maharashtra State Legislature at the behest of Pawar, who also put in a word for Naik with the police when the latter was arrested for his role in post-Demolition of the Babri Masjid riots in Mumbai.

Pawar is also alleged to have close links with the underworld don Dawood Ibrahim through Ibrahim's henchman Lakhan Singh, based in the Middle East, and a close relationship with Shahid Balwa, who is also a suspect in the 2G spectrum case. These allegations were strengthened by the revelation of the involvement of Vinod Goenka, Balwa's business partner, in a controversial commercial project in Yerwada, Pune, which was being constructed under the same survey number as Pawar's family friend, Atul Chordia, had constructed the Panchshil Tech Park. BJP leader Eknath Khadse alleged that it was Balwa who had applied for environmental clearance for the two projects, a charge that Chordia refuted. Coincidentally, Chordia's Panchshil Pvt. Ltd. has Pawar's daughter, Supriya Sule, and her husband, Sadanand, as investors.

The state government's decision to hand over a 3-acre plot of the Yerwada police station for "redevelopment" to Balwa was retracted following Balwa's arrest. For several years, confusion existed about the number of blasts in the 1993 Bombay Bombings, whether they were 12 or 13 in number. This was because Pawar, the then chief minister of Maharashtra, stated on television that day that there had been 13 blasts, and included a Muslim-dominated locality in the list. He later revealed that he had lied on purpose and that there had been only 12 blasts, none of them in Muslim-dominated areas; he also confessed that he had attempted to mislead the public into believing that the blasts could be the work of the LTTE, a Sri Lankan militant organization, when in fact intelligence reports had already confirmed to him that Mumbai's Muslim underworld (known as the "D-Company," a reference to Dawood Ibrahim) were the perpetrators of the serial blasts.

=== Land allotment ===
On 27 October 2007, the Bombay High Court served notices to institutions headed by Pawar, Ajit Pawar, and Sadanand Sule (Pawar's son-in-law), along with a corresponding notice served to the Maharashtra Krishna Valley Development Corporation (MKVDC) on why special privileges were given to Pawar and his family. This was done in consideration of Public Interest Litigation No. 148 of 2006, filed by Shamsunder Potare, alleging that the said 2002 land allocations in Pune were illegal. The institutions and properties mentioned include:

- Two 141.15-acre (57.12 ha) plots were allotted to Vidya Pratishthan, an educational society headed by Sharad Pawar.
- A 2-acre (0.81 ha) plot allotted to Anant Smriti Pratishthan, headed by Ajit Pawar, the Maharashtra state minister for irrigation and Pawar's nephew.
- A 32.12-acre (13.00 ha) plot allotted to Lavasa Corporation, owned by Sule. Sule handed over his share to the Lavasa Corporation in 2006.
- A 1-acre (0.40 ha) plot allotted to Shivajinagar Agriculture College.
- A 3-acre (1.2 ha) plot allotted to the Sharadchandraji Scout and Guide Training Institute.

These allocations were allegedly made by NCP leader and minister Ramraje Naik Nimbalkar, who was in charge of MKVDC at the time. Pawar was served a contempt of court notice on 1 May 2008 in connection with this case for issuing statements to the press even though the matter was subjudice at the time. Also, in connection with the case, the respondents were instructed not to create third-party interests in the disputed property and to undertake any developments at their own risk.

=== IPL exemption from tax controversy ===
In 2010, in the case of tax exemptions of the Indian Premier League (IPL), Shiv Sena MLA Subhash Desai alleged that the state cabinet decided in January to impose the tax, before the year's IPL season started, but the decision was not implemented because of NCP chief Pawar's association with the Board of Control for Cricket in India (BCCI). Bombay High Court in August 2010 said there was "nothing on record" to show that the Union Minister influenced the Maharashtra government's decision to exempt Indian Premier League matches from entertainment tax.

=== Asset declaration ===
In 2011, Pawar declared his assets to be worth ₹120 million (equivalent to ₹270 million or US$2.8 million in 2026) as part of a mandatory disclosure, but his critics claimed that his wealth far exceeded the stated amount. In 2010, it was alleged that the Pawar family indirectly held a 16% stake in the City Corporation, which had bid ₹11.76 billion (equivalent to ₹29 billion or US$300 million in 2026) for the Pune franchise of the Indian Premier League (IPL). Pawar and his family denied the allegations, but the bidders' board of the IPL contradicted their claims.

=== Nira Radia's allegations ===
In 2011, under investigation of the 2G spectrum case, Nira Radia told the Central Bureau of Investigation (CBI) that Agriculture Minister Pawar may be controlling the controversial DB Realty. According to the reports, she also told the investigative agency that Pawar may have spoken with former telecom minister A. Raja about the allocation of spectrum and licence to Swan Telecom. Radia also said that she had no documentary proof to support her allegations. Pawar has denied any link with former DB managing director Shahid Balwa, who is now in CBI custody.

=== Lavasa ===
Pawar is alleged to have demanded compensation for allowing the planned city of Lavasa to be constructed. When Lavasa Corporation was receiving necessary clearances from the government of Maharashtra, relatives of Pawar had part-ownership of the company developing the project. Pawar's daughter and son-in-law had more than 20% ownership between 2002 and 2004, and they later sold their stakes. A nephew of his was chairman of Maharashtra Krishna Valley Development Corporation (MKVDC) when the MKVDC signed off on lease agreements for Lavasa and allowed it to store water and build dams.

=== Comments on the 2010 Pune bombing ===
After the 2010 Pune bombing of German Bakery, Pawar appeared to take the incident lightly. He told the reporters, "It is not alright to arrive at a conclusion that the entire Pune city has been targeted. The place where the blast took place is an isolated area." He added, "When I was Chief Minister, Mumbai saw 11 simultaneous blasts, but everything returned to normal soon."

=== Slapping incident ===
Pawar was slapped by a youth named Harvinder Singh at the New Delhi Municipal Corporation Centre while leaving the premises after attending a literary function on 24 November 2011. The attacker, who was previously said to have also assaulted former telecom minister Sukh Ram, was later arrested in 2019.

=== Turban controversy ===
In 2018, Pawar asked party members to felicitate him with the pagadi (turban) of social reformer Mahatma Phule, instead of the usual Puneri Pagadi worn by peshwas (prime ministers) of the Maratha Empire. In response to criticism that he was "trying to stir up anti-Brahmin sentiment" and "appeal to Dalits", Pawar said that he wasn't rejecting any section of society but honouring his idols- Phule, Babasaheb Ambedkar, and Shahu Maharaj.

=== Details of Criminal Cases ===
Criminal Cases where accused
IPC Sections	Criminal Cases (brief)
IPC Section-409	Charges related to criminal breach of trust by public servant, or by banker, merchant or agent
IPC Section-406	Charges related to criminal breach of trust
IPC Section-465	Charges related to forgery
IPC Section-467	Charges related to Forgery of valuable security, will, etc.
IPC Section-468	Charges related to Forgery for purpose of cheating
IPC Section-471	Charges related to Using as genuine a forged document or electronic record
IPC Section-34	Charges related to Acts done by several persons in furtherance of common intention
IPC Section-120B	Charges related to Punishment of criminal conspiracy
IPC Section-420	Charges related to Cheating and dishonestly inducing delivery of property

== Awards and honours ==
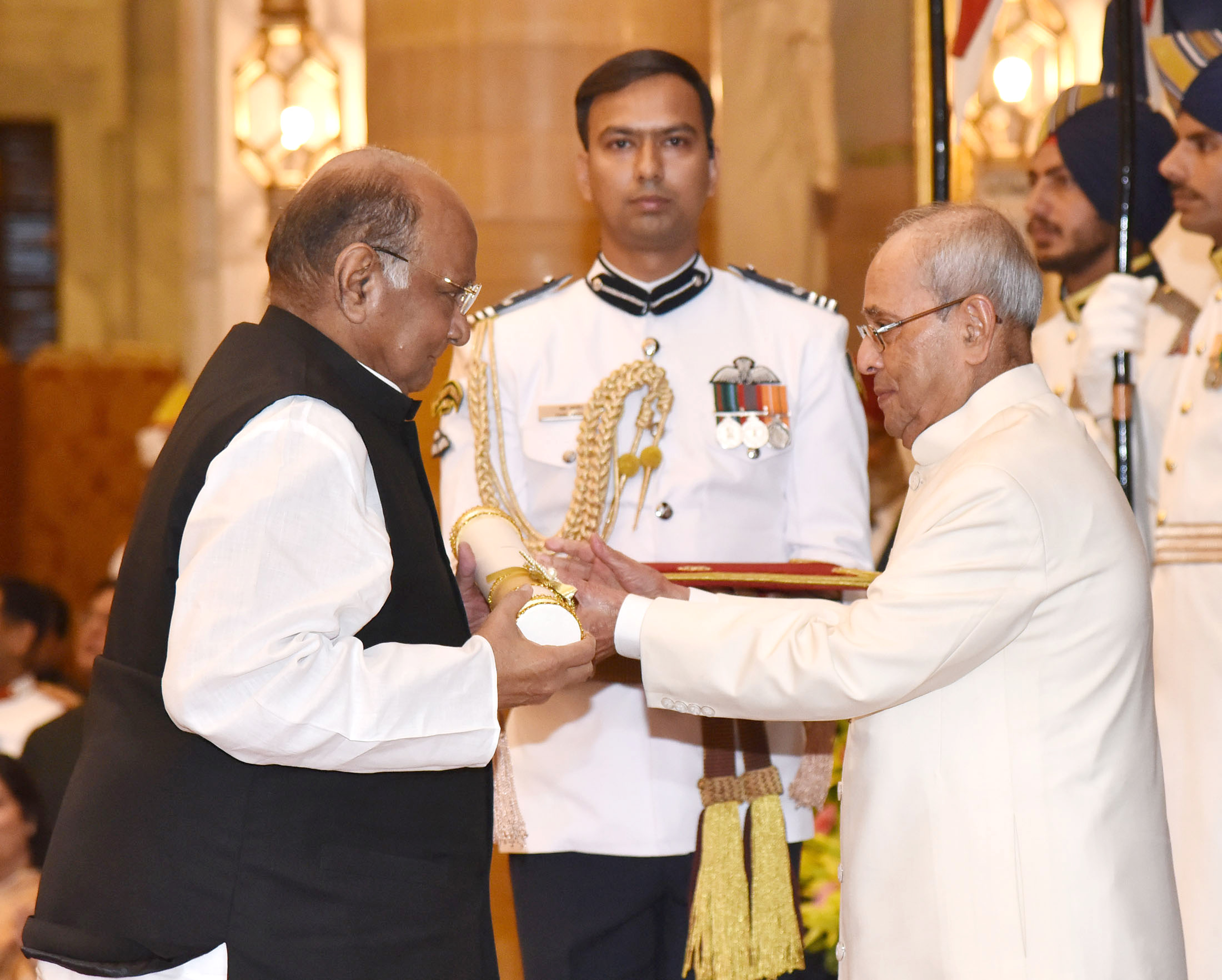
The President, Shri Pranab Mukherjee presenting the Padma Vibhushan Award to Sharad Pawar, at a Civil Investiture Ceremony, at Rashtrapati Bhavan, in New Delhi on 30 March 2017

- Padma Vibhushan (2017) – In 2017, Pawar was honoured with the Padma Vibhushan, India's second-highest civilian award, on the recommendation of the Narendra Modi-led BJP government. The timing of the award was questioned by observers, and some attributed it to the political motivations of the BJP.
- Newsmakers Achievers Awards 2022.
- Honoured Lokmat Parliamentary lifetime achievement award in the hands of Vice President M Venkaiah Naidu for parliamentarians who bring about progress, create hope and are a source of inspiration and pride for the country.

== Health ==
In 1999, Pawar was diagnosed with oral cancer. In April 2004, he underwent a major oral surgery at Mumbai's Breach Candy Hospital to remove an infection in his oral cavity. In March 2021, he underwent surgery for his gallbladder problem.

== See also ==
- First Sharad Pawar ministry
- Political families of Maharashtra

== Notes ==
Political offices
Preceded by Vasantdada Patil	Chief Minister of Maharashtra; 18 July 1978 – 17 February 1980	Succeeded by A R Antule
Preceded by Shankarrao Chavan	Chief Minister of Maharashtra; 26 June 1988 – 25 June 1991	Succeeded by Sudhakarrao Naik
Preceded by Chandra Shekhar	Minister of Defence; 26 June 1991 – 6 March 1993	Succeeded by P. V. Narasimha Rao
Preceded by Shankarrao Chavan	Chief Minister of Maharashtra; 6 March 1993 – 14 March 1995	Succeeded by Manohar Joshi
Preceded by Rajnath Singh	Minister of Agriculture; 23 May 2004 - 26 May 2014	Succeeded by Radha Mohan Singh
Preceded by Sharad Yadav	Minister of Consumer Affairs, Food and Public Distribution; 23 May 2004 - 19 January 2011	Succeeded by K. V. Thomas
Lok Sabha
Preceded by Atal Bihari Vajpayee	Leader of the Opposition in Lok Sabha; 19 March 1998 – 26 April 1999	Succeeded by Sonia Gandhi
Preceded by Shankarrao Bajirao Patil	Member of Parliament for Baramati; 1984-1985	Succeeded by Sambhajirao Kakade
Preceded by Ajit Pawar	Member of Parliament for Baramati; 1991-1994	Succeeded by Bapusaheb Thite
Preceded by Bapusaheb Thite	Member of Parliament for Baramati; 1996-2004	Succeeded by Supriya Sule
Civic offices
Preceded by Rameshwar Thakur	Presidents of the Bharat Scouts and Guides; 2001–2004	Succeeded by Rameshwar Thakur
Preceded by Ranbir Singh Mahendra	President, Board of Control for Cricket in India; 2005–2008	Succeeded by Shashank Manohar
Preceded by David Morgan	President, International Cricket Council; 2010–2012	Succeeded by Alan Issac
Party political offices
Preceded by D. Devaraj Urs	President of the Indian Congress (Socialist); 1981–1986	Merged with the Indian National Congress
Preceded by position established	Leader of the Nationalist Congress Party in the Lok Sabha; 1998–2014	Succeeded by Supriya Sule
