= History of Nagpur =

Aspect of Indian history

The history of Nagpur, in central India, spans over 5,000 years, including the Kingdom of Nagpur in the 18th and 19th century. Human existence around present-day Nagpur city (in Maharashtra, India) can be traced back 3,000 years to the 8th century BC. Menhir burial sites at Drugdhamna (near Mhada colony) indicate megalithic culture existed around Nagpur and is still followed in present times.

The first reference to the name "Nagpur" is found in a 10th-century copper-plate inscription discovered at Devali in the neighbouring Wardha district. The inscription is a record of grant of a village situated in the visaya (district) of Nagpura-Nandivardhana during time of Rastrakuta king Krsna III in the Saka year 862 (940 CE). Inscription found at Ramtek show that during the 12th century AD Nagpur and its surrounding regions formed the part of the thickly wooded country called Jhadimandala under Yadavas of Devagiri. However, tradition ascribes the founding of Nagpur to Bakht Buland Shah, a prince of the Gond kingdom of Deogarh in the Chhindwara district.

In 1743, the Maratha leader Raghoji Bhonsale of Vidarbha established himself at Nagpur, after conquering the territories of Deogarh, Chanda and Chhattisgarh by 1751. After Raghoji's death in 1755, his son and successor Janoji was forced to acknowledge the effective supremacy of the Maratha Peshwa of Pune in 1769. Regardless, the Nagpur state continued to grow. Janoji's successor Mudhoji I Bhonsale (d. 1788) came to power in 1785 and bought Mandla and the upper Narmada valley from the Peshwa between 1796 and 1798, after which Raghoji II Bhonsale (d. 1816) acquired Hoshangabad, the larger part of Saugor and Damoh. Under Raghoji II, Nagpur covered what is now the east of Maharashtra, Chhattisgarh, Orissa, and parts of Madhya Pradesh and Jharkhand.

In 1803 Raghoji II joined the Peshwas against the British in the Second Anglo-Maratha War. The British prevailed, and Raghoji was forced to cede Cuttack, Sambalpur, and part of Berar. After Raghoji II's death in 1816, his son Parsaji was deposed and murdered by Mudhoji II Bhonsale. Despite the fact that he had entered into a treaty with the British in the same year, Mudhoji joined the Peshwa in the Third Anglo-Maratha War in 1817 against the British, but was forced to cede the rest of Berar to the Nizam of Hyderabad, and parts of Saugor and Damoh, Mandla, Betul, Seoni and the Narmada valley to the British after suffering a defeat at Sitabuldi in modern-day Nagpur city. The Sitabuldi fort was the site of a fierce battle between the British and the Bhonsale of Nagpur in 1817. The battle was a turning point as it laid the foundations of the downfall of the Bhonsales and paved the way for the British acquisition of Nagpur city. Mudhoji was deposed after a temporary restoration to the throne, after which the British placed Raghoji III Bhonsale the grandchild of Raghoji II, on the throne. During the rule of Raghoji III (which lasted till 1853), the region was administered by a British resident. In 1854 the British annexed Nagpur, after Raghoji III had died some months before without leaving an heir.

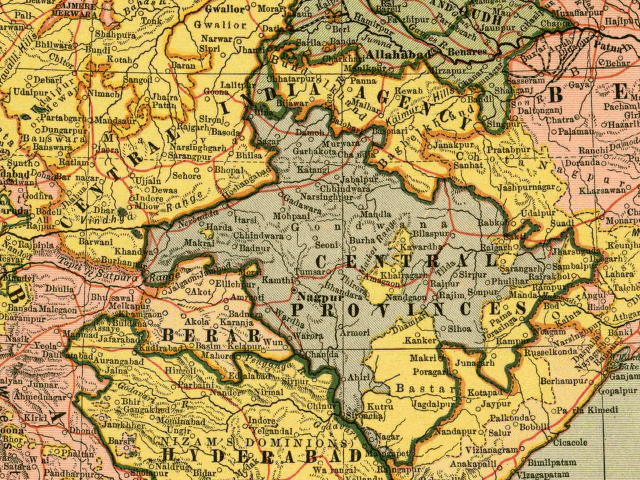
Central Provinces and Berar, 1903. Princely states are shown in yellow.

In 1861, the Nagpur Province (which consisted of the present Nagpur region, Chhindwara, and Chhattisgarh and existed from 1854 to 1861) became part of the Central Provinces and came under the administration of a commissioner under the British central government, with Nagpur as its capital. Tata Group started the country's first textile mill at Nagpur, formally known as Central India Spinning and Weaving Company Ltd. The company was popularly known as "Empress Mills" as it was inaugurated on 1 January 1877, the day Queen Victoria was proclaimed Empress of India.

Hislop college was the first and foremost college in Nagpur and it was established in 1846. In June 1885, the second college in Nagpur was established, the Morris College, Nagpur, and it was the first government college. All Saints Cathedral is the first Anglican Church. Bishop Cotton School is the first school which was established by Anglicans in Nagpur. References are to be found in The History of All Saints Cathedral. Berar was added in 1903. Political activity in Nagpur during India's freedom struggle included hosting of two annual sessions of the Indian National Congress. The Non-cooperation movement was launched in the Nagpur session of 1920. In August 1923, the University of Nagpur was established by the education department of Central Province Government. In 1925, K. B. Hedgewar founded RSS, a Hindu nationalist organization in Nagpur with an idea of creating a Hindu nation.

After Indian Independence in 1947, Central Provinces and Berar became a province of India, and in 1950 became the Indian state of Madhya Pradesh, again with Nagpur as its capital. However, when the Indian states were reorganized along linguistic lines in 1956, the Nagpur region and Berar were transferred to Bombay state, which in 1960 was split between the states of Maharashtra and Gujarat. At a formal public ceremony on 14 October 1956 in Nagpur, B. R. Ambedkar along with his supporters converted to Buddhism starting Dalit Buddhist movement which is still active.

In 1994, the city witnessed its most violent day in modern times due to the Gowari stampede deaths.
