= Anantrao Thopate =

Indian politician (1933–2026)

Member of the Maharashtra Legislative Assembly for the Bhor Assembly constituency
- In office 13 October 2004 – 7 November 2009
- Preceded by: Kashinath Khutwad
- Succeeded by: Sangram Anantrao Thopate
- In office 9 June 1980 – 18 October 1999
- Preceded by: Sampatrao Jedhe
- Succeeded by: Kashinath Khutwad
- In office 15 March 1972 – 27 February 1978
- Preceded by: Shankar Bhelke
- Succeeded by: Sampatrao Jedhe

Personal details
- Born: 11 January 1933 Bhor, Bombay Presidency, British India
- Died: 4 June 2026 (aged 93) Pune, Maharashtra, India
- Party: INC
- Education: Sir Parashurambhau College (BA)
- Occupation: Civil servant

Anantrao Thopate (11 January 1933 – 4 June 2026) was an Indian politician. A member of the Indian National Congress, he served in the Maharashtra Legislative Assembly from 1972 to 1978, 1980 to 1999, and 2004 to 2009.

Thopate died on 4 June 2026, at the age of 93.
