= Rahul Kul =

Indian politician

Member of Maharashtra Legislative Assembly
- Incumbent
- Assumed office 2014
- Preceded by: Rameshraoappa Kishanrao Thorat
- Constituency: Daund

Personal details
- Party: Bharatiya Janata Party
- Other political affiliations: Rashtriya Samaj Paksha
- Parents: Subhashrao Kul (father); Ranjanatai Kul (mother)

Rahul Subhashrao Kul (born 1977) is an Indian politician from Maharashtra. He is a three time member of the Maharashtra Legislative Assembly from 2014 representing Daund Assembly constituency in Pune District. He won in 2014, 2019 and 2024.

== Early life and education ==
Kul is from Rahu, Daund, Pune. His late father Subhash Baburao Kul was three time MLA from Daund while his mother Ranjana Kul is also a former MLA from Daund. He completed his L.L.B. in 2000 at ILS Law College, which is affiliated with Pune University.

== Career ==
Kul succeeded his mother and became an MLA for the first time representing Rashtriya Samaj Paksha, winning the 2014 Maharashtra Legislative Assembly election defeating NCP's Ramesh Thorat by a margin of 11,345 votes. Later, he shifted to the Bharatiya Janata Party and retained the seat winning the 2019 Maharashtra Legislative Assembly election on the BJP ticket. He polled 103,664 votes and again defeated Thorat of NCP, but by a narrow margin of 746 votes. He won for the third time, contesting on the BJP ticket and winning the 2024 Assembly election, Rameshappa Kishanrao Thorat of the NCP (SP), by a margin of 13,889 votes.
