= Indapur Assembly constituency =

Constituency of the Maharashtra legislative assembly in India

Coordinates: 18.11°N 75.03°E

Indapur
- Constituency No. 200 for the Maharashtra Legislative Assembly

Constituency details
- Country: India
- Region: Western India
- State: Maharashtra
- District: Pune
- Lok Sabha constituency: Baramati
- Established: 1952
- Total electors: 341,749
- Reservation: None

Member of Legislative Assembly
- 15th Maharashtra Legislative Assembly
- Incumbent Dattatray Vithoba Bharne
- Party: NCP
- Alliance: NDA
- Elected year: 2024

Indapur Assembly constituency is one of the 288 Vidhan Sabha (legislative assembly) constituencies of Maharashtra state, western India. This constituency is located in Pune district, and is one of the 6 Vidhan Sabha seats which make up Baramati Lok Sabha constituency.

== Geographical scope ==
The constituency comprises Indapur taluka. The city of Indapur is located near Bheema river.

== Members of the Legislative Assembly ==
Election	Member	Party
1952	Shankarrao Bajirao Patil	Indian National Congress
1957	Shankarrao Bajirao Patil	Indian National Congress
1962	Shankarrao Bajirao Patil	Indian National Congress
1967	Shankarrao Bajirao Patil	Indian National Congress
1972	Shankarrao Bajirao Patil	Indian National Congress
1978	Shankarrao Bajirao Patil	Indian National Congress
1980	Gholap Rajendra Kumar Baburao	Indian National Congress
1985	Ganpatrao Sitaram Patil	Indian National Congress
1990	Ganpatrao Sitaram Patil	Indian National Congress
1995	Harshvardhan Shahajirao Patil	Independent politician
1999	Harshvardhan Shahajirao Patil	Independent politician
2004	Harshvardhan Shahajirao Patil	Independent politician
2009	Harshvardhan Shahajirao Patil	Indian National Congress
2014	Dattatray Vithoba Bharne	Nationalist Congress Party
2019	Dattatray Vithoba Bharne	Nationalist Congress Party
2024	Dattatray Vithoba Bharne	Nationalist Congress Party

== Election results ==
=== Assembly Election 2024 ===
2024 Maharashtra Legislative Assembly election : Indapur
Party	Candidate	Votes	%	±%
NCP	Dattatray Vithoba Bharne	117,236	44.35%	New
NCP-SP	Harshvardhan Shahajirao Patil	97,826	37.01%	New
Independent	Mane Pravin Dasharath	37,917	14.34%	New
Maharashtra Vikas Aghadi	Adv. Girish Madan Patil	2,141	0.81%	New
Independent	Bhimrao Jagannath Shinde	1,943	0.74%	New
NOTA	None of the above	634	0.24%	▼0.07
Margin of victory		19,410	7.34%	▲6.00
Turnout		264,985	77.54%	▲1.12
Total valid votes		264,351		
Registered electors		341,749		▲11.73
NCP gain from NCP		Swing	▼5.04	

=== Assembly Election 2019 ===
2019 Maharashtra Legislative Assembly election : Indapur
Party	Candidate	Votes	%	±%
NCP	Dattatray Vithoba Bharne	114,960	49.39%	▼0.43
BJP	Harshvardhan Shahajirao Patil	111,850	48.05%	▲46.09
VBA	Adv. Sachin Bhaskar Jore	1,731	0.74%	New
NOTA	None of the above	731	0.31%	▲0.11
Margin of victory		3,110	1.34%	▼5.17
Turnout		233,755	76.42%	▼2.35
Total valid votes		232,767		
Registered electors		305,866		▲10.46
NCP hold		Swing	▼0.43	

=== Assembly Election 2014 ===
2014 Maharashtra Legislative Assembly election : Indapur
Party	Candidate	Votes	%	±%
NCP	Dattatray Vithoba Bharne	108,400	49.82%	New
INC	Harshvardhan Shahajirao Patil	94,227	43.30%	▼5.33
BJP	Chavare Dnyandeo Alias Mauli Haribhau	4,260	1.96%	New
SS	Bondre Vishal Shivram	2,184	1.00%	▼1.15
NOTA	None of the above	437	0.20%	New
Margin of victory		14,173	6.51%	▲2.34
Turnout		218,132	78.77%	▲2.01
Total valid votes		217,594		
Registered electors		276,911		▲11.24
NCP gain from INC		Swing	▲1.19	

=== Assembly Election 2009 ===
2009 Maharashtra Legislative Assembly election : Indapur
Party	Candidate	Votes	%	±%
INC	Harshvardhan Shahajirao Patil	92,729	48.63%	New
Independent	Dattatray Vithoba Bharne	84,769	44.45%	New
SS	Bhimrao Manikrao Bhosale Pa.	4,106	2.15%	▼38.91
Independent	Shivajirao Vaman Makhare	2,634	1.38%	New
BSP	Shakil Makbul Sayyad	1,742	0.91%	▼1.41
Margin of victory		7,960	4.17%	▼10.28
Turnout		191,070	76.76%	▲2.26
Total valid votes		190,685		
Registered electors		248,929		▲8.96
INC gain from Independent		Swing	▼6.88	

=== Assembly Election 2004 ===
2004 Maharashtra Legislative Assembly election : Indapur
Party	Candidate	Votes	%	±%
Independent	Harshvardhan Shahajirao Patil	94,409	55.51%	New
SS	Garatkar Pradeep Prabhakar	69,836	41.06%	New
BSP	Pradeepkumar Giridhar Sable	3,952	2.32%	New
RSPS	Kale Sunil Ganapat	1,875	1.10%	New
Margin of victory		24,573	14.45%	▼6.21
Turnout		170,212	74.50%	▼1.66
Total valid votes		170,072		
Registered electors		228,469		▲21.91
Independent hold		Swing	▲5.78	

=== Assembly Election 1999 ===
1999 Maharashtra Legislative Assembly election : Indapur
Party	Candidate	Votes	%	±%
Independent	Harshvardhan Shahajirao Patil	64,840	49.73%	New
NCP	Nimbalkar Murlidhar Shankarrao	37,898	29.07%	New
Independent	Garatkar Pradeep Prabhakar	25,401	19.48%	New
INC	Narute Kisan Sakharam	1,655	1.27%	▼30.44
Margin of victory		26,942	20.66%	▲13.27
Turnout		142,738	76.16%	▼9.25
Total valid votes		130,387		
Registered electors		187,408		▲3.19
Independent hold		Swing	▲10.63	

=== Assembly Election 1995 ===
1995 Maharashtra Legislative Assembly election : Indapur
Party	Candidate	Votes	%	±%
Independent	Harshvardhan Shahajirao Patil	59,125	39.10%	New
INC	Patil Ganpatrao Sitaram	47,949	31.71%	▼22.53
Independent	Garatkar Pradeep Prabhakar	38,797	25.66%	New
Independent	Sonwane Sunil Vishwanth	3,212	2.12%	New
Independent	Thorat Tanaji Sahebrao	1,345	0.89%	New
Margin of victory		11,176	7.39%	▼21.62
Turnout		155,120	85.41%	▲18.05
Total valid votes		151,200		
Registered electors		181,617		▲4.19
Independent gain from INC		Swing	▼15.14	

=== Assembly Election 1990 ===
1990 Maharashtra Legislative Assembly election : Indapur
Party	Candidate	Votes	%	±%
INC	Ganpatrao Sitaram Patil	62,638	54.24%	▲3.46
Independent	More Jagannathrao Marutrao	29,135	25.23%	New
SS	Jadhao Balbhim Narayan	12,218	10.58%	New
JD	Ransing Vishwasrao Krishnaji	11,281	9.77%	New
Margin of victory		33,503	29.01%	▲23.54
Turnout		117,413	67.36%	▲0.62
Total valid votes		115,486		
Registered electors		174,310		▲27.95
INC hold		Swing	▲3.46	

=== Assembly Election 1985 ===
1985 Maharashtra Legislative Assembly election : Indapur
Party	Candidate	Votes	%	±%
INC	Ganpatrao Sitaram Patil	45,511	50.78%	New
IC(S)	Jagannathrao Marutrao More	40,613	45.32%	New
Independent	Ratnakar Malhari Makhare	1,933	2.16%	New
Independent	L. D. Bhosale	1,026	1.14%	New
Margin of victory		4,898	5.47%	▼2.01
Turnout		90,925	66.74%	▲1.11
Total valid votes		89,620		
Registered electors		136,237		▲13.30
INC gain from INC(I)		Swing	▼2.96	

=== Assembly Election 1980 ===
1980 Maharashtra Legislative Assembly election : Indapur
Party	Candidate	Votes	%	±%
INC(I)	Gholap Rajendra Kumar Baburao	41,619	53.74%	▲50.00
INC(U)	More Jagannathrao Marutrao	35,826	46.26%	New
Margin of victory		5,793	7.48%	▼7.03
Turnout		78,914	65.63%	▼8.12
Total valid votes		77,445		
Registered electors		120,248		▲5.85
INC(I) gain from INC		Swing	▲4.09	

=== Assembly Election 1978 ===
1978 Maharashtra Legislative Assembly election : Indapur
Party	Candidate	Votes	%	±%
INC	Shankarrao Bajirao Patil	40,332	49.65%	▼15.40
Independent	Avate Ganapt Abaji	28,543	35.14%	New
JP	Hegde Anna Madhav	8,119	9.99%	New
INC(I)	Ransing Vishwasrao Krishnaji	3,039	3.74%	New
Independent	Zende Pandurang Bapu	1,201	1.48%	New
Margin of victory		11,789	14.51%	▼16.95
Turnout		83,787	73.75%	▲2.87
Total valid votes		81,234		
Registered electors		113,602		▲20.16
INC hold		Swing	▼15.40	

=== Assembly Election 1972 ===
1972 Maharashtra Legislative Assembly election : Indapur
Party	Candidate	Votes	%	±%
INC	Shankarrao Bajirao Patil	42,294	65.05%	▲4.08
SSP	Avate Ganapt Abaji	21,842	33.60%	New
RPI(K)	Kambale Bhanudassakharam	673	1.04%	New
Margin of victory		20,452	31.46%	▲8.34
Turnout		67,017	70.88%	▲0.56
Total valid votes		65,014		
Registered electors		94,544		▲17.08
INC hold		Swing	▲4.08	

=== Assembly Election 1967 ===
1967 Maharashtra Legislative Assembly election : Indapur
Party	Candidate	Votes	%	±%
INC	Shankarrao Bajirao Patil	32,420	60.97%	▲14.58
PSP	G. A. Awate	20,124	37.85%	New
PWPI	R. K. Raskar	629	1.18%	▼26.44
Margin of victory		12,296	23.12%	▲4.36
Turnout		56,784	70.32%	▲10.17
Total valid votes		53,173		
Registered electors		80,755		▲14.93
INC hold		Swing	▲14.58	

=== Assembly Election 1962 ===
1962 Maharashtra Legislative Assembly election : Indapur
Party	Candidate	Votes	%	±%
INC	Shankarrao Bajirao Patil	18,676	46.39%	▼9.53
PWPI	Dinkarrao Shankarrao Patil	11,122	27.62%	New
Independent	Kerba Dhondiba Vyavhare	4,974	12.35%	New
Independent	Narayan Dattatraya Kulkarni	3,263	8.10%	New
ABJS	Hanmant Shriniwas Deshpande	1,190	2.96%	New
Independent	Shhankar Krushnajee Sonawane	561	1.39%	New
Independent	Tukaram Shripati Nalawade	476	1.18%	New
Margin of victory		7,554	18.76%	▼2.27
Turnout		42,262	60.15%	▲21.70
Total valid votes		40,262		
Registered electors		70,263		▲30.23
INC hold		Swing	▼9.53	

=== Assembly Election 1957 ===
1957 Bombay State Legislative Assembly election : Indapur
Party	Candidate	Votes	%	±%
INC	Shankarrao Bajirao Patil	11,600	55.92%	▲17.36
Independent	Makare Krishna Lavji	7,237	34.89%	New
Independent	Ghogare Ganpat Baburao	1,906	9.19%	New
Margin of victory		4,363	21.03%	▲0.32
Turnout		20,743	38.45%	▼8.58
Total valid votes		20,743		
Registered electors		53,952		▼3.39
INC hold		Swing	▲17.36	

=== Assembly Election 1952 ===
1952 Bombay State Legislative Assembly election : Indapur
Party	Candidate	Votes	%	±%
INC	Shankarrao Bajirao Patil	10,127	38.56%	New
Socialist	Kulkarni Narayan Dattatraya	4,688	17.85%	New
PWPI	Kadam Sahebrao Bhausaheb	3,023	11.51%	New
Independent	Shembekar Ganesh Gopal	2,685	10.22%	New
Independent	Gavade Jijaba Nanasaheb	2,638	10.04%	New
SCF	Makare Krishnaji Lavsaji	1,646	6.27%	New
Independent	Jaranje Shankarrao Marutrao	1,455	5.54%	New
Margin of victory		5,439	20.71%	
Turnout		26,262	47.03%	
Total valid votes		26,262		
Registered electors		55,845		
INC win (new seat)				
