= Dattatray Vithoba Bharne =

Indian politician

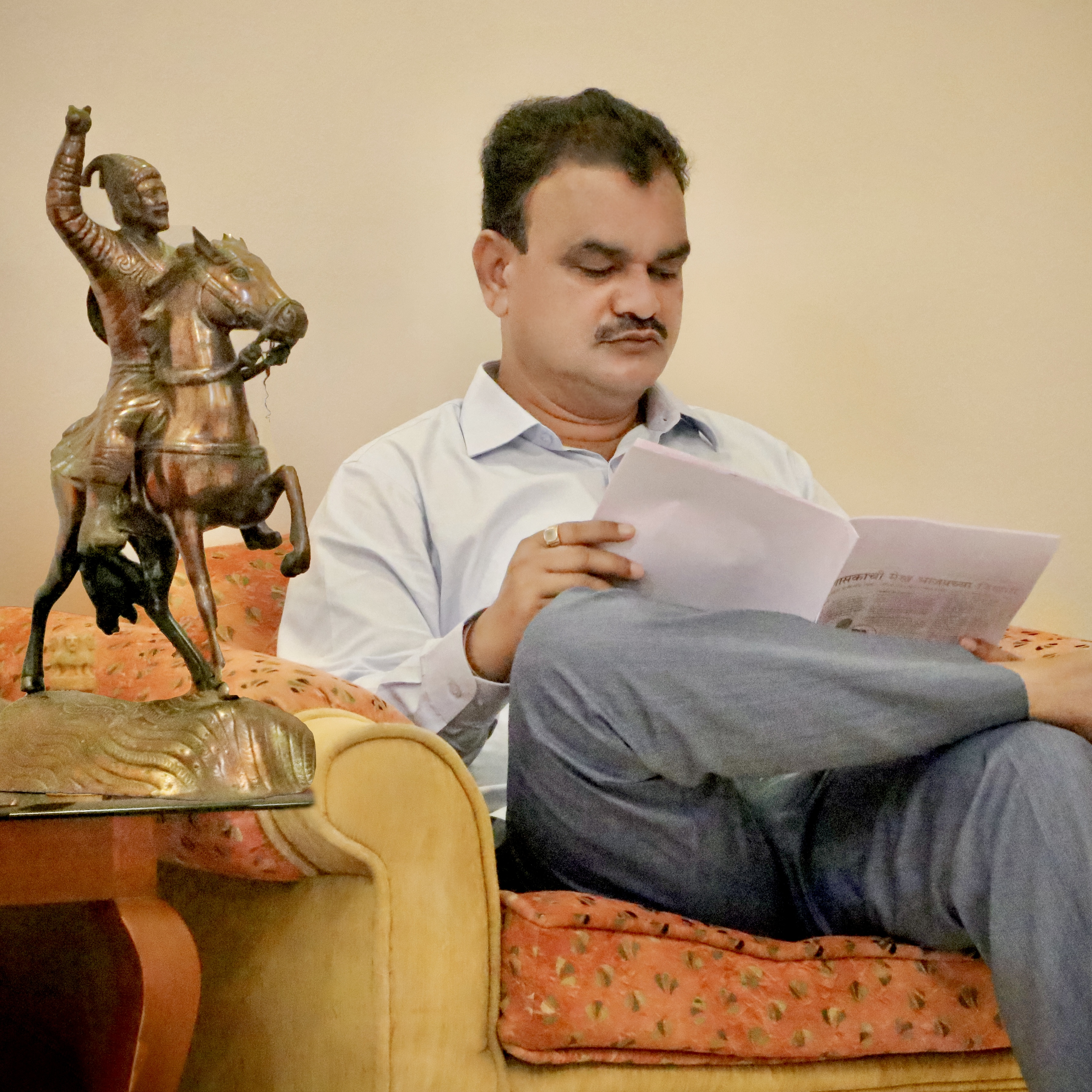

Cabinet Minister Government of Maharashtra
- Incumbent
- Assumed office 31 July 2025
- Minister: Ministry of Agriculture
- Cabinet: Third Fadnavis ministry
- Preceded by: Manikrao Kokate

Cabinet Minister Government of Maharashtra
- In office 15 December 2024 – 31 July 2025
- Minister: Sports and Youth Welfare; Minority Development and Aukaf
- Governor: C. P. Radhakrishnan
- Cabinet: Third Fadnavis ministry
- Chief Minister: Devendra Fadnavis
- Deputy CM: Eknath Shinde; Ajit Pawar
- Guardian Minister: NA

Minister of State Government of Maharashtra
- In office 30 December 2019 – 29 June 2022
- Minister: Public Works (excluding Public Undertakings); Soil and Water Conservation; Forests Department; Animal Husbandry; Dairy Development; Fisheries Department; General Administration; Other Backward Classes Additional charge on 27 June 2022; Other Backward Bahujan Welfare Additional charge on 27 June 2022; Socially and Educationally Backward Classes Additional charge on 27 June 2022; Vimukta Jati Additional charge on 27 June 2022; Nomadic Tribes Additional charge on 27 June 2022; Special Backward Classes Welfare Additional charge on 27 June 2022; Majority Welfare Development Additional charge on 27 June 2022
- Governor: Bhagat Singh Koshyari
- Chief Minister: Uddhav Thackeray
- Deputy CM: Ajit Pawar
- Guardian Minister: Solapur District

Member of the Maharashtra Legislative Assembly
- Incumbent
- Assumed office (2014-2019), (2019-2024), (2024-Present)
- Preceded by: Harshavardhan Patil
- Constituency: Indapur

Personal details
- Born: Dattatray Vithoba Bharne; 1 June 1968 (age 58) Bharnewadi, Indapur, Pune District
- Party: Nationalist Congress Party

Dattatray Vithoba Bharne is an Indian politician. He is a three-time MLA for the Indapur Assembly constituency, having first won election to the post during the 2014 Maharashtra Legislative Assembly election. He is a member of the Nationalist Congress Party and the Ajit Pawar faction of the party during its 2023 split. He is currently an MLA and the state sports and youth welfare minister. Previously, he served as a minister in the Thackeray Ministry and as the Guardian Minister of Solapur District.

== Early life and career ==
Bharne was born into a wealthy farming family and has completed a Bachelor of Commerce degree. He became Director of the Chhatrapati Sahakari Sakhar Karkhana in 1992. He also joined the Pune District Central Cooperative Bank as a director in 1996, becoming head of the bank in 2000. In 2002, he also became head of the Karkhana.

== Political career ==
Bharne contested and won the 2014 Maharashtra Legislative Assembly election in Indapur constituency as a candidate for the Nationalist Congress Party. He also won re-election in 2019, serving as a minister in the Thackeray Ministry and as the Guardian Minister of Solapur District. In 2023, during the Nationalist Congress Party split, he joined the Ajit Pawar faction of the party. In the 2024 Maharashtra Legislative Assembly election, he contested the election on a NCP ticket against NCP(SP) candidate Harshvardhan Patil and local NCP leader Pravin Mane, who contested as an independent. Bharne won the election by a margin of 19410 votes. He was later made the state sports and youth welfare minister. He was reportedly initially angry over his portfolio, refusing to answer calls from Ajit Pawar and going overseas with his family to express his discontent. In May 2025, Bharne was made president of a newly formed committee to restructure Maharashtra's youth policy. This committee was criticised for its lack of women and opposition MLAs.
