= Suresh Khopade =

Indian politician

Suresh Abaji Khopade PMG (born 1 June 1951) is an Indian writer and a retired Indian Police Service (IPS) officer. He is a pioneer of community policing initiatives in the state of Maharashtra. He is well known for safeguarding then hyper-sensitive town Bhiwandi during the 1992 communal Riots. He is a recipient of the President's Medal for Gallantry in 1993. He retired as Special Inspector General of CID.

He also has established a conceptual school near a small village Morgaon in Baramati taluk of Pune District, named 'Koodachi shala', which is not a school in traditional sense, but a place which can best be described as a tourist point for school-going children. Many schools visit this place to have an interesting learning experience about all spheres of life.

On 13 March 2014 he was named as an Aam Aadmi Party candidate for Baramati South Lok Sabha constituency.
