= Shankar Mandekar =

Indian politician

Member of Legislative Assembly Maharashtra
- Incumbent
- Assumed office 2024
- Preceded by: Sangram Anantrao Thopate
- Constituency: Bhor

Personal details
- Born: 13 August 1973 (age 53) Chande, Mulshi taluka, Pune District
- Party: Nationalist Congress Party

Shankar Hiraman Mandekar (born 1973) is an Indian politician from Maharashtra. He is an MLA from Bhor Assembly constituency in Pune District. He won the 2024 Maharashtra Legislative Assembly election representing the Nationalist Congress Party.

== Early life and education ==
Mandekar is from Chande, Mulshi taluk, Pune District, Maharashtra. He is the son of Hiraman Vishnu Mandekar. He passed Class 12 at Sant Gora Kumbhar High School and Junior College, Pashan and later discontinued his studies.

== Career ==
Mandekar won from Bhor Assembly constituency representing the Nationalist Congress Party in the 2024 Maharashtra Legislative Assembly election. He polled 126,455 votes and defeated his nearest rival and three time MLA, Sangram Anantrao Thopate of the Indian National Congress, by a margin of 19,638 votes. It ended Congress Party's 15 year hold on the constituency.
