= Sangram Anantrao Thopate =

Indian politician

Member of Legislative Assembly Maharashtra
- In office 2009–2024
- Preceded by: Anantrao Thopate
- Succeeded by: Shankar Mandekar
- Constituency: Bhor

Personal details
- Born: 7 November 1977 (age 48) Bhor
- Citizenship: India
- Party: Bharatiya Janata Party (2025-present)
- Other political affiliations: Indian National Congress (Till April 2025)
- Children: Prithviraj Thopte
- Parent: Anantrao Thopte (father)
- Education: B.A from Pune Vidyapeeth, Abasaheb Garware College, Pune In 1999
- Profession: Member of legislative assembly

Sangram Anantrao Thopate is an Indian politician and a member of Bharatiya Janata Party. He previously served as Member of the Maharashtra Legislative Assembly from Bhor (Vidhan Sabha constituency) as a member of Indian National Congress. He is a son of Anantrao Thopate a 6-term MLA from the same assembly constituency and a former minister in the state government.

On 22 March 2017, Thopate was suspended along with 18 other MLAs until 31 December for interrupting Maharashtra Finance Minister Sudhir Mungantiwar during a state budget session and burning copies of the budget outside the assembly four days earlier. In April 2025, He quit Indian National Congress and joined Bharatiya Janata Party
