= Gulabrao Jedhe =

Indian politician

Member of Parliament, Lok Sabha
- In office 1960–1967
- Preceded by: Keshavrao Jedhe
- Succeeded by: Tulsidas Jadhav
- Constituency: Baramati, Maharashtra

Personal details
- Born: 9 December 1922 Pune, Bombay Presidency, British India
- Party: Indian National Congress
- Spouse: Subhadrabai
- Parent: Keshavrao Jedhe (father)

Gulabrao Keshavrao Jedhe (born 9 December 1922) is an Indian politician. He was elected to the Lok Sabha, the lower house of the Parliament of India from Baramati in Maharashtra in 1962 as a member of the Indian National Congress.
