= Shankarrao Bajirao Patil =

Indian politician

Shankarrao Patil

Member of Parliament, Lok Sabha
- In office 1980–1984
- Preceded by: Sambhajirao Kakade
- Succeeded by: Sharad Pawar
- In office 1989–1991
- Preceded by: Sambhajirao Kakade
- Succeeded by: Ajit Pawar
- Constituency: Baramati, Maharashtra

Personal details
- Born: 15 February 1924 Bawada, Pune District, Bombay Presidency, British India
- Died: 13 September 2006 (aged 82)
- Party: Indian National Congress (INC)
- Spouse: Late. Leelavati
- Children: Padma Bhosale

Shankarrao Bajirao Patil (15 February 1924 – 13 September 2006) was an Indian politician who served as Member of Parliament between 1980–1984 and 1989-1991 from Baramati parliamentary constituency. He was also Member of Legislative Assembly of Bombay state between 1952 and 1957, partially between 1957–60 and then of Maharashtra between 1962 and 1967, 1967-72 1972–78, and 1978–80. He was Minister of State between 1962–74 and Cabinet Minister in Government of Maharashtra during 1974–78.

== Early life and family ==
Patil completed his Bachelor of Arts from Fergusson College and LL.B. from I.L.S. Law College Pune. Harshavardhan Patil, a senior minister in Maharashtra is his nephew.

== Career ==
Member

- Maharashtra Legislative Assembly, 1952–57, 1957–62, 1962–67, 1967-72 1972–78, 1978–80
- Lok Sabha, 1980–84 and 1989–91.

== Positions ==
Gen. Secy. PCC (I) Maharashtra, 1978–80

President

- Ex-Chairman and Founder, Indapur Sahakari Sakhar Karkhana, Pune
- Ex-Chairman, Indapur Shikshan Prasarak Mandal
- Ex-Chairman, Shivaji Education Society, Bawada
