= Harshvardhan Patil =

Indian politician

Harshvardhan Shahajirao Patil

Member of Maharashtra Legislative Assembly
- In office 1995–2014
- Preceded by: Ganpatrao Sitaram Patil
- Succeeded by: Dattatray Vithoba Bharne
- Constituency: Indapur

Minister of State Government of Maharashtra
- In office 14 March 1995 – 17 Oct 1999
- Minister: Agriculture; Horticulture; Soil and water conservation
- Preceded by: Manikrao Thakare
- Succeeded by: Dada Jadhavrao

Cabinet Minister Government of Maharashtra
- In office 9 Sep 2001 – 1 Nov 2004
- Minister: Marketing; Employment Guarantee
- Preceded by: Ganpatrao Deshmukh
- Succeeded by: Ranjeet Deshmukh

Cabinet Minister Government of Maharashtra
- In office 9 Nov 2004 – 1 Dec 2008
- Minister: Marketing; Employment Guarantee
- Preceded by: Vilasrao Deshmukh
- Succeeded by: Vinay Kore; Madan Patil

Cabinet Minister Government of Maharashtra
- In office 8 Dec 2008 – 6 Nov 2009
- Minister: Co-Operation; Cultural Affairs
- Preceded by: Patangrao Kadam; Vilasrao Deshmukh
- Succeeded by: Ramraje Naik Nimbalkar; Ashok Chavan

Cabinet Minister Government of Maharashtra
- In office 7 Nov 2009 – 10 Nov 2010
- Minister: Parliamentary Affairs; Marketing
- Preceded by: Anees Ahmed
- Succeeded by: Madan Patil; Mohammed Arif Naseem Khan

Cabinet Minister Government of Maharashtra
- In office 11 Nov 2010 – 26 Sep 2014
- Minister: Parliamentary Affairs; Co-Operation
- Preceded by: Ramraje Naik Nimbalkar
- Succeeded by: Prakash Mehta; Chandrakant Patil

Personal details
- Born: 21 August 1963 (age 62) At.Post Bawada, Tq. Indapur, Pune District
- Party: Nationalist Congress Party (Sharadchandra Pawar) (2024-Incumdent)
- Other political affiliations: Bharatiya Janata Party (2019-2024); Indian National Congress (Before 2019)
- Spouse: Mrs. Bhagyashri Patil
- Relations: Shankarrao Bajirao Patil (Uncle)
- Children: Ankitaa Patil Thackeray; Rajvardhan Patil

Harshvardhan Shahajirao Patil (born 21 August 1963), is an Indian politician from Nationalist Congress Party (Sharadchandra Pawar) from Indapur, near Pune in Maharashtra. He quit Indian National Congress in September 2019 after a long association with it.

He was one of the few ministers who was presiding as a minister for four consecutive terms (1995-2014) in Government of Maharashtra. He has shouldered responsibilities of Cooperative Ministry and currently Legislative Affairs. He is known for cordial relations with all party members. He was a minister from 1995 to 2014.

He was elected MLA as an independent in 1995, 1999, 2004. In 2009 he was elected MLA as an Indian National Congress candidate. He was appointed co-operation and parliamentary affairs minister in Chief minister Prithviraj Chavan's ministry. There are tussles seen for control over Indapur between Nationalist Congress Party and Indian National Congress under his leadership.

In August 2014, he was attacked by few activists who hurled ink at him injuring his left eye. He was immediately taken to Baramati for primarily treatment. A few months later, in October 2014 Maharashtra Legislative Assembly Election, he was defeated from Indapur constituency by Nationalist Congress Party candidate Dattatray Vithoba Bharne by margin of 14,173 votes.

He is the nephew of Shankarrao Bajirao Patil, the former MP.
