= 1994 Gowari stampede =

Mass panic by police on protesters in India

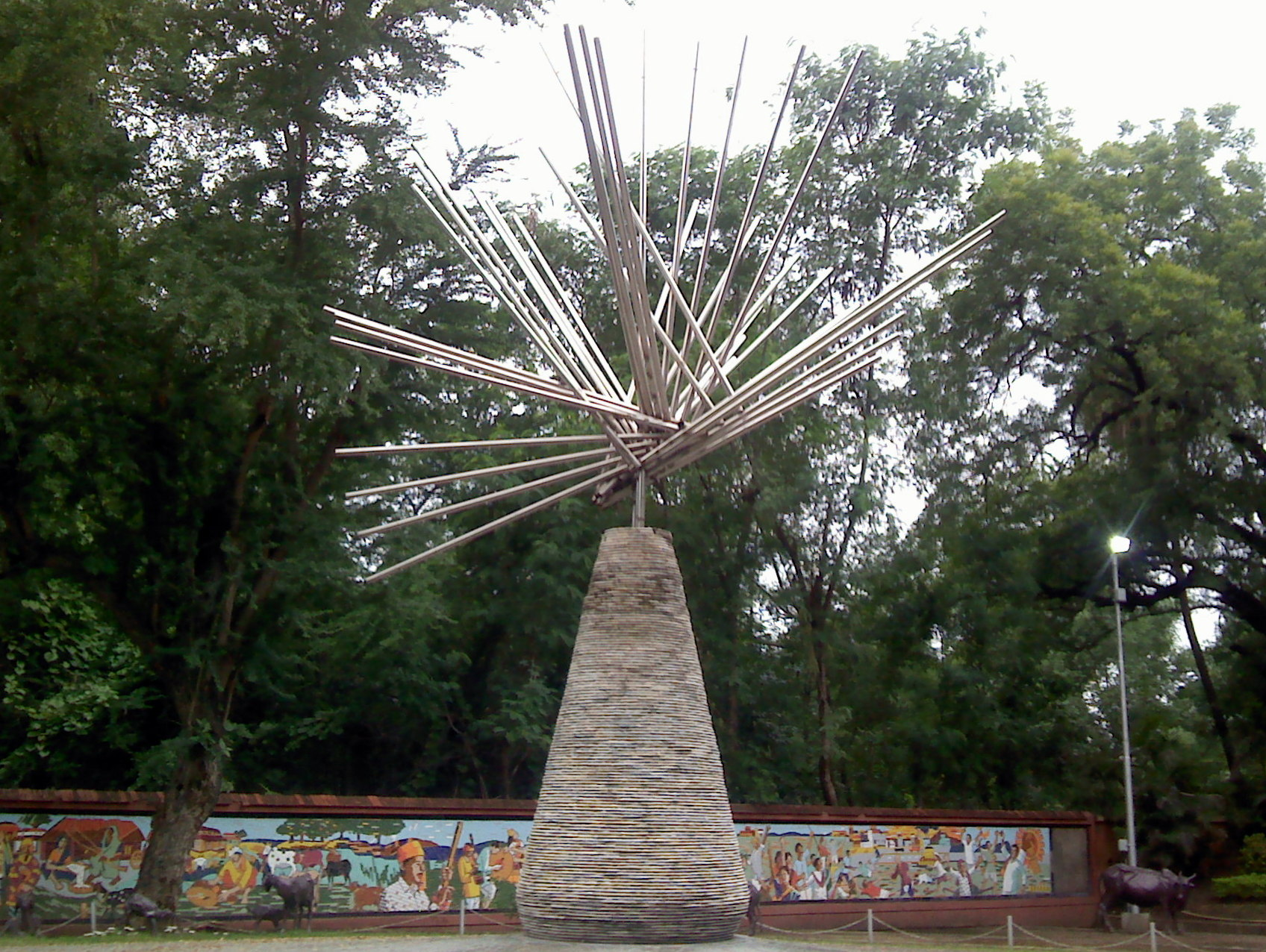
- Memorial of the Adivasi Gowari Stampede at Zero Mile, Nagpur
- Date: 23 November 1994
- Time: 5:30 IST
- Location: Nagpur, India
- Deaths: 114
- Injuries: 500

The 1994 Gowari stampede occurred at Nagpur, India on 23 November 1994 in which 114 people from the Gowari community were killed and 500 more injured. Nagpur Police were trying to disperse almost 50,000 Gowari protesters using a baton charge but it created panic and triggered a stampede amongst the protesters. Gowaris are an ethnic group of central India and are predominantly present in Nagpur. The majority of casualties were women and children who were crushed to death under the crowd's feet as they scrambled to escape the police line. Some were victims of barbed wire piercing as they were climbing over high fences to escape. The Maharashtra state government appointed the one-man Justice S S Dani Commission to investigate the event, but it held nobody responsible and referred to the tragedy as an "unfortunate" one. The Commission justified the police action of baton-charge to control such a huge crowd. The commission also cleared state Chief Minister Sharad Pawar and the rest of the government for any responsibility in the incident. Maharashtra's Tribal Development Minister Madhukar Pichad later resigned, accepting moral responsibility for the tragedy.

== Stampede ==
Every year, the winter session of Maharashtra state assembly, Vidhan Sabha, is held at Vidhan Bhavan, Nagpur. For quite some time, the Gowari community had been demanding Scheduled Tribe status to avail themselves of the benefits of reservations in government jobs and education. On 23 November 1994, Gowari protesters, led by Gowari Sanghatana, were trying to reach Vidhan Bhavan and present their demands to the state government. Nagpur police had earlier banned all protest marches during the winter session of the assembly. Nagpur Police stopped the march of 50,000 protesters at Nagpur's Vasantrao Naik College of Arts and Social Sciences (Morris college). However, no government official turned up to talk with protesters and resentment grew. Disturbances started amongst the crowd as they tried to break the police barricades. Police gave out repeated warnings to maintain order but the situation was getting out of control. Chief Minister Sharad Pawar had already flown back to Mumbai after concluding the day's session. At 5:30 pm, a car with a red light atop it arrived and protesters at the front rushed towards it. They assumed some minister had arrived to take up their petition. However, police feared trouble and started wielding batons to push back the protesters. This initially caused them to retreat, but word of the police attack spread, causing a panic, with protesters trying to run away. Women along with children who were part of the protest march got caught in the midst of the chaos. They were trampled and asphyxiated under the feet of running protesters. In all, 114 people lost their lives in the tragedy. Autopsies conducted on the victims concluded that their deaths were caused by traumatic asphyxia. They were the result of chest compression and obstruction of the respiratory system.

== Enquiry ==
Soon after the tragedy, the Maharashtra government appointed a one-man commission - Justice S S Dani - to investigate the causes of the tragedy. Meanwhile, the opposition Bhartiya Janata Party-Shiv Sena coalition took immediate political advantage of this tragedy and it became one of the factors for the Indian National Congress losing the state elections of 1995. After many extensions, the Dani Commission finally tabled its report in March 1998 and found nobody responsible. It noted that Pawar was neither aware of the protest taking place outside of Vidhan Bhawan nor the nature of the protesters' demands. Pawar, who was now leader of the opposition in the Lok Sabha, had initially stated that he feared state government was trying to frame him by altering the commission's report. The commission concluded that the police were right to initiate a baton charge on the surging crowd in order to maintain order while the assembly session was going on. It also noted that almost all deaths were caused due to people getting trampled under the feet of the stampeding crowd and suffering asphyxia, and not due to injuries caused by the baton charge. However, the commission suggested that water sprayers and rubber bullets be used first and that police should carry out baton charges only as a last resort, after giving two warnings. The Commission based its report on statements given by local press and photographers along with independent witnesses at the site. The BJP-SS led government quickly rejected the report.

Chief Minister Manohar Joshi was quoted as saying

"Any one of them going and talking to the protesters could have averted the tragedy".

== Current situation ==
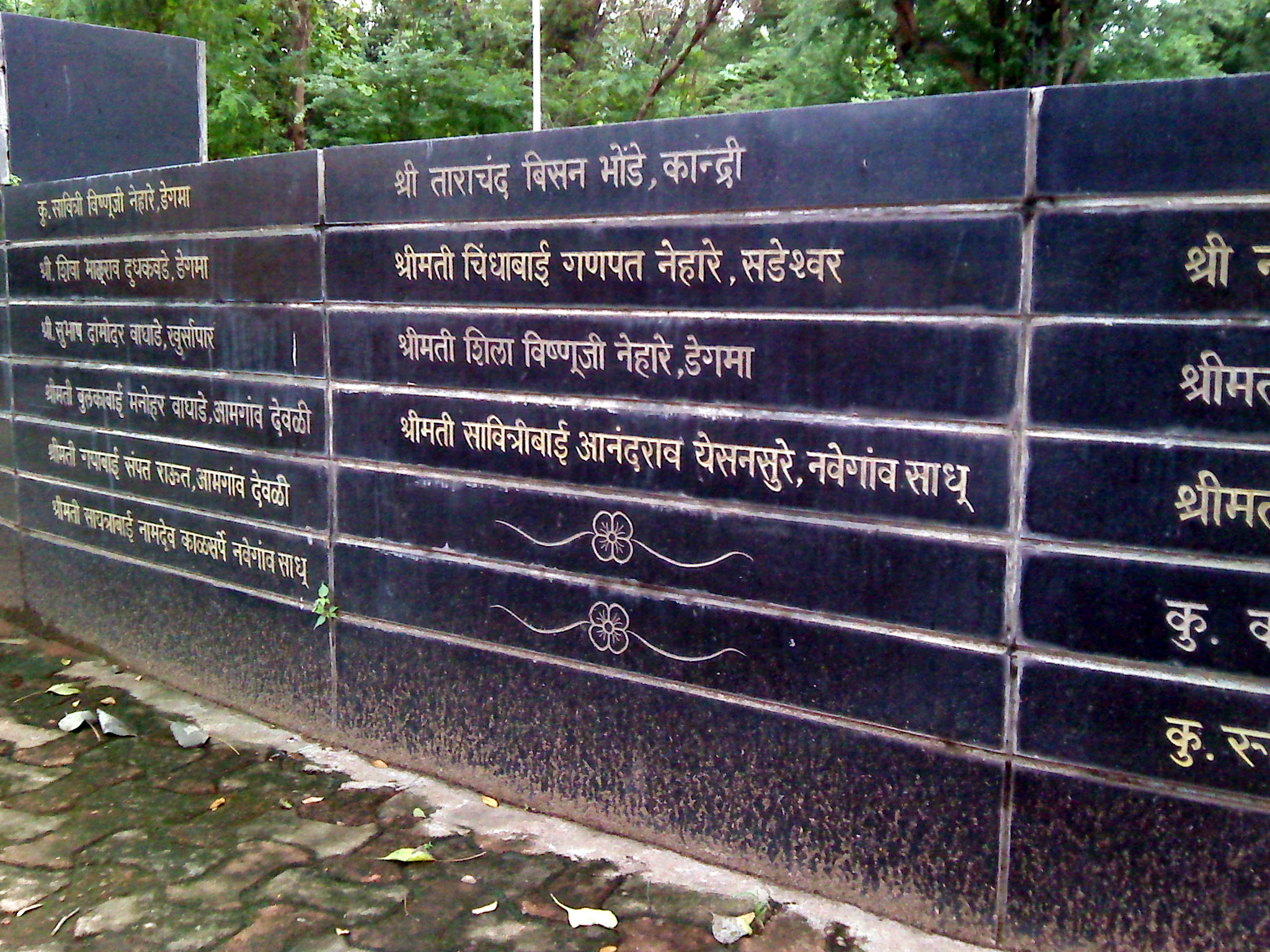
Names of victims at the memorial

After coming to power, the Bhartiya Janata Party-Shiv Sena-led government had announced a Special Backward Caste (SBC) category for 47 such communities with 2 percent reservations in education and government jobs. However, the Supreme Court of India ruling that reservation quotas cannot exceed 50 percent has created legal problems for SBC quotas. Political efforts to assimilate 2 percent SBC under already existing scheduled tribe or other backward caste (OBC) quotas have faced tough opposition from their respective legislators' lobby. After losing the 2004 Maharashtra state assembly elections, the BJP seems to have lost interest in Gowari incident. The Gowari issue surfaced periodically during assembly sessions. The Nagpur bench of Bombay High Court on 15 August 2018 ruled that Gowari community in Maharashtra should get benefits under the Scheduled Tribes (ST) category, pointing out that Gowaris were categorised as a tribe more than hundred years ago in the records of British India.

A monument has been built in central Nagpur to commemorate those who died in this tragedy. Also, the flyover in Sitabuldi has been named Aadivasi Gowari Shahid flyover.
