= Gowari =

Caste in India

Gowari is an Indian caste of cattleman or herdsmen, predominantly residing in Maharashtra, Madhya Pradesh, and Chhattisgarh.

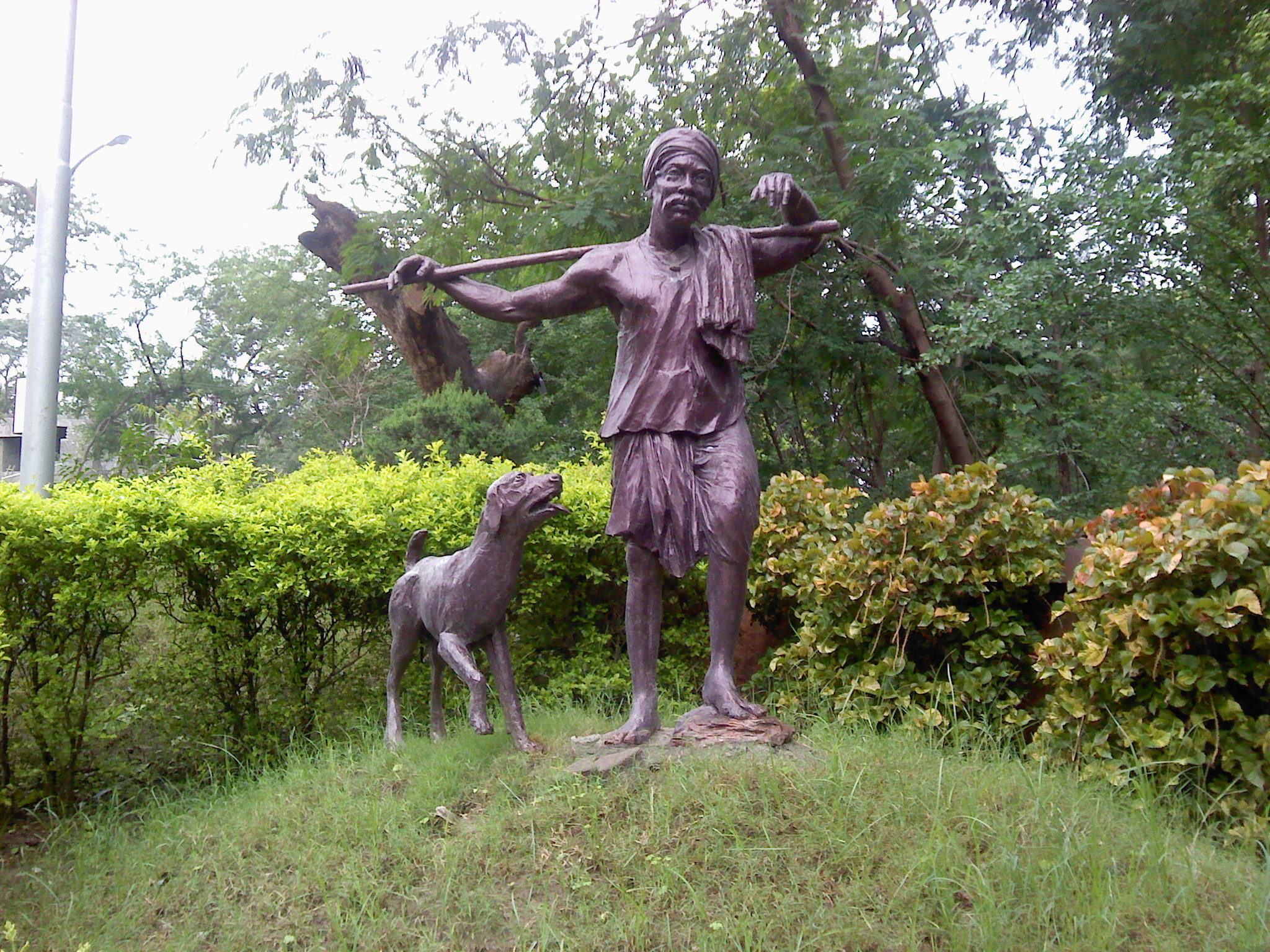
A Gowari man with his dog

== Overview ==
Gowari is one of over 700 tribal groups in India. In censuses conducted in India from 1871 to 1941, tribals were enumerated separately from other religions, identified by various classifications such as Other religion-1871, Aboriginal 1881, Forest Tribe-1891, Animist-1901, Animist-1911, Primitive-1921, Tribal Religion-1931, and "Tribe-1941". However, starting from the 1951 census, tribals have been counted within the Hindu category. Despite occasional errors in literature, they do not speak a distinct language. The principal deities of the Gowāris are the Kode Kodwan or deified ancestors, worshipped during annual festivals and weddings.

The original ancestors are believed to be Kode Kodwan, the names of two Gond gods, Bāghoba (the tiger-god), and Meghnāth, son of Rāwan, after whom the Gonds are called Rāwanvansi or descendants of Rāwan. There are two main castes among the Gonds: (1) Aadi Gond or Dhur Gond, and (2) Raj Gond. Adi Gonds, known as ordinary Gonds, mostly inhabit forest areas away from modern civilization, while Raj Gonds are those who were kings with their own land and kingdom. The Gond people called him Rajgond, who was earlier a chieftain or a king living among the Gond tribes. As they ran the royal palace and were part of the elite branch, they also came to be called Rajgond. Over time, many Gond dynasties came in contact with other kings, with some adopting Shaivism and others adopting Hinduism, thereby departing from their Gondi culture. Additionally, differences among the Gonds are also based on their additional professions: (1) Ojha or Baiga - exorcist, (2) Pardhan - priest, (3) Solaha - carpenter, (4) Gowari - shepherd, and (5) Agaria - blacksmith.

== Distribution and reservations ==
Gowari is included in the special backward class group with a 2% reservation in Maharashtra, and in the Other Backward Class (OBC) group with a 14% reservation in Madhya Pradesh.

Gond-Gowari has been part of the scheduled tribes with a 7.5% reservation in the Central Government since 1956, while Gowari has been included in the OBC group with a 27% reservation in the Central Government since 1993.

== Gowari stampede ==
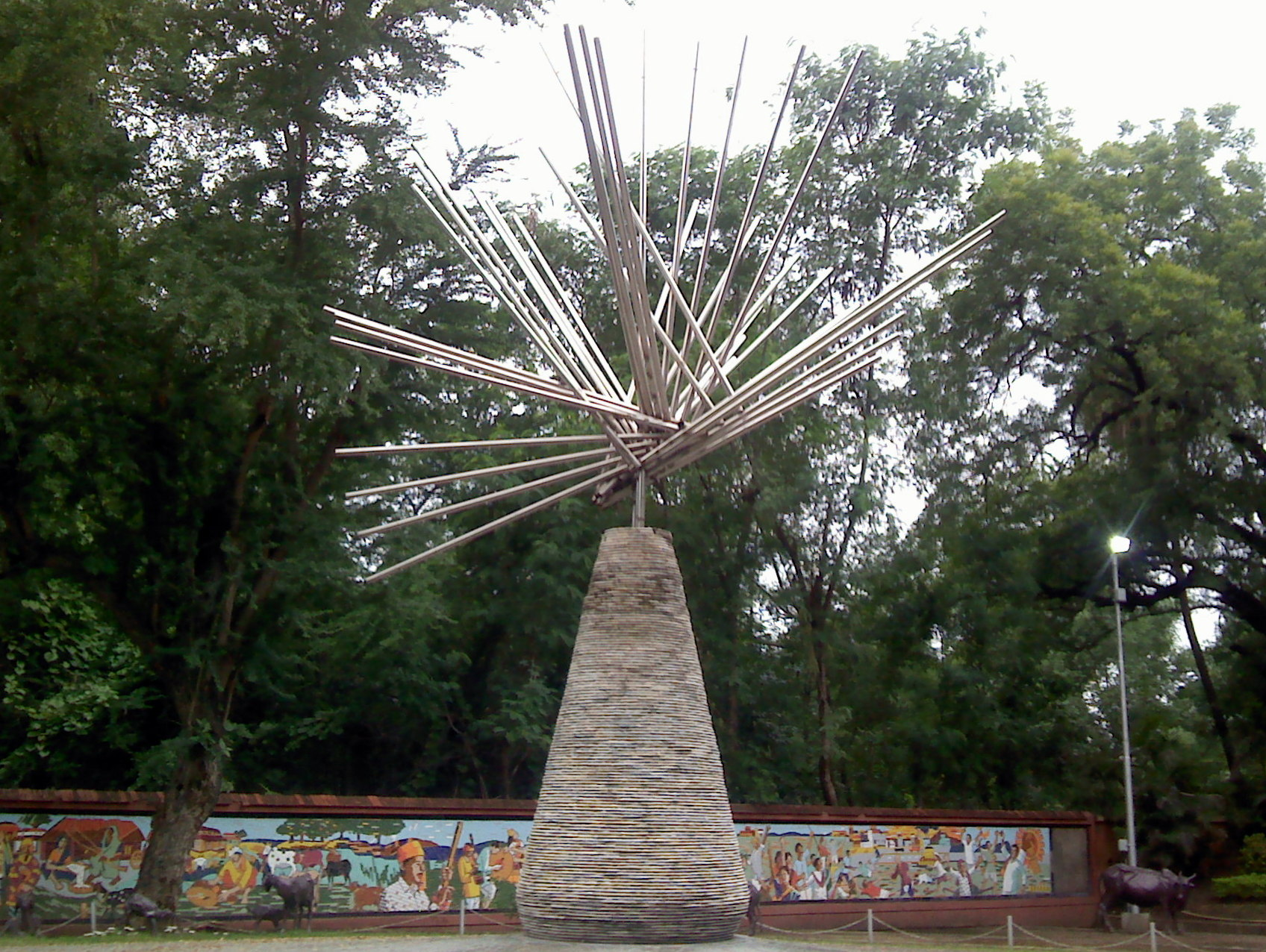
Shaheed Gowari Memorial at Zero Mile, Nagpur

There was a stampede during a protest in Nagpur on 23 November 1994, known as the 1994 Gowari stampede, in which 114 people from the Gowari community were killed and more than 500 were injured. In commemoration of those who died in this tragedy, a monument called the Gowari Shaheed Smarak has been erected in Nagpur near the Zero Mile Stone (the geographical center of India).

== See also ==
- Dhangar, another herdsman caste
- Ahir
- Golla
- Gopal (caste)
- Yadava
- Sadgop
- Konar (caste)
