= Daund Assembly constituency =

Constituency of the Maharashtra legislative assembly in India

Coordinates: 18.46°N 74.58°E

Daund
- Constituency No. 199 for the Maharashtra Legislative Assembly

Constituency details
- Country: India
- Region: Western India
- State: Maharashtra
- District: Pune
- Lok Sabha constituency: Baramati
- Established: 1978
- Total electors: 319,609
- Reservation: None

Member of Legislative Assembly
- 15th Maharashtra Legislative Assembly
- Incumbent Rahul Kul
- Party: Bharatiya Janata Party
- Elected year: 2024

Daund Assembly constituency is one of the 288 Vidhan Sabha (legislative assembly) constituencies of Maharashtra state, western India. This constituency is located in Pune district.

== Geographical scope ==
The constituency comprises Daund taluka.

== Members of the Legislative Assembly ==
Year	Member	Party
1952	Marthand Magar	Indian National Congress
1952	Ganpat Kharat	Indian National Congress
1957	Ram Tupe	Praja Socialist Party
1957	Purshottam Choure	Scheduled Caste Federation
1962	Vitthal Pawar	Indian National Congress
1967	P. J. Tatyaba	Indian National Congress
1972	Ushadevi Jagdale	Indian National Congress
1978	Rajaram Takavane	Janata Party
1980	Krishnarao Jagdale	Indian National Congress (U)
1985	Ushadevi Jagdale	Indian Congress (Socialist)
1990	Subhashrao Kul	Independent
1995	Subhashrao Kul	Indian National Congress
1999	Subhashrao Kul	Nationalist Congress Party
2004	Ranjana Subhashrao Kul	Nationalist Congress Party
2009	Rameshrao Thorat	Independent
2014	Rahul Kul	Rashtriya Samaj Paksha
2019	Rahul Kul	Bharatiya Janata Party
2024	Rahul Kul	Bharatiya Janata Party

== Election results ==
=== Assembly Election 2024 ===
2024 Maharashtra Legislative Assembly election : Daund
Party	Candidate	Votes	%	±%
BJP	Rahul Subhashrao Kul	120,721	51.27%	▲2.63
NCP-SP	Rameshappa Kisan Thorat	106,832	45.37%	New
Rashtriya Maratha Party	Ramesh Thorat	3,863	1.64%	New
NOTA	None of the Above	1,211	0.51%	▲0.08
Margin of victory		13,889	5.90%	▲5.55
Turnout		236,690	74.06%	▲4.81
Total valid votes		235,479		
Registered electors		319,609		▲3.27
BJP hold		Swing	▲2.63	

=== Assembly Election 2019 ===
2019 Maharashtra Legislative Assembly election : Daund
Party	Candidate	Votes	%	±%
BJP	Rahul Subhashrao Kul	103,664	48.64%	New
NCP	Rameshappa Kisan Thorat	102,918	48.29%	▲9.75
VBA	Dattatray Alias Tatyasaheb Namdev Tamhane	2,633	1.24%	New
NOTA	None of the Above	917	0.43%	▼0.31
Margin of victory		746	0.35%	▼5.38
Turnout		214,241	69.22%	▼3.92
Total valid votes		213,131		
Registered electors		309,486		▲13.78
BJP gain from RSPS		Swing	▲4.37	

=== Assembly Election 2014 ===
2014 Maharashtra Legislative Assembly election : Daund
Party	Candidate	Votes	%	±%
RSPS	Rahul Subhashrao Kul	87,649	44.27%	New
NCP	Rameshappa Kisan Thorat	76,304	38.54%	▼0.30
MNS	Rajaram Maruti Tambe	17,098	8.64%	New
PWPI	Vikas (Aaba) Takavane	5,560	2.81%	New
SS	Rajendra Shankar Khati	2,974	1.50%	New
Independent	Pandurang Balkrishna Mergal	1,606	0.81%	New
BSP	Kiran Shravan Pol	1,509	0.76%	▼0.15
NOTA	None of the Above	1,464	0.74%	New
Margin of victory		11,345	5.73%	▼4.18
Turnout		199,464	73.33%	▲3.66
Total valid votes		197,977		
Registered electors		271,999		▲6.89
RSPS gain from Independent		Swing	▼4.48	

=== Assembly Election 2009 ===
2009 Maharashtra Legislative Assembly election : Daund
Party	Candidate	Votes	%	±%
Independent	Rameshappa Kisan Thorat	85,764	48.75%	New
NCP	Adv. Rahul Subhashrao Kul	68,322	38.84%	▼13.75
BJP	Vasudev Shankarrao Kale	7,063	4.02%	New
Independent	Mangal Dattu Wagh	5,553	3.16%	New
Independent	Sanjay Ambadas Kambale	2,620	1.49%	New
SWP	Bhanudas Suresh Shinde	2,392	1.36%	New
BSP	Ajit Gulab Thokale	1,600	0.91%	▼0.89
Margin of victory		17,442	9.92%	▼2.54
Turnout		176,077	69.19%	▼1.89
Total valid votes		175,913		
Registered electors		254,471		▼7.06
Independent gain from NCP		Swing	▼3.84	

=== Assembly Election 2004 ===
2004 Maharashtra Legislative Assembly election : Daund
Party	Candidate	Votes	%	±%
NCP	Ranjana Subhashrao Kul	102,264	52.59%	▼5.93
Independent	Rameshappa Kisan Thorat	78,037	40.13%	New
Independent	Bankar Tukaram Genba	5,471	2.81%	New
BSP	Gaikwad Raju Baburao	3,502	1.80%	New
Independent	Chormale Ulhas Mugut	2,050	1.05%	New
Margin of victory		24,227	12.46%	▼18.78
Turnout		194,515	71.04%	▲8.26
Total valid votes		194,459		
Registered electors		273,799		▲21.66
NCP hold		Swing	▼5.93	

=== Assembly Election 1999 ===
1999 Maharashtra Legislative Assembly election : Daund
Party	Candidate	Votes	%	±%
NCP	Subhash Baburao Kul	82,655	58.52%	New
BJP	Vasudev Shankarao Kale	38,536	27.28%	▲8.95
INC	Premsukh Kisandas Kataria	18,860	13.35%	▼63.08
Margin of victory		44,119	31.24%	▼26.86
Turnout		147,765	65.66%	▼9.86
Total valid votes		141,243		
Registered electors		225,045		▲2.47
NCP gain from INC		Swing	▼17.91	

=== Assembly Election 1995 ===
1995 Maharashtra Legislative Assembly election : Daund
Party	Candidate	Votes	%	±%
INC	Subhash Baburao Kul	121,914	76.43%	▲35.64
BJP	Tanaji Sambhaji Divekar	29,244	18.33%	▲13.36
Independent	Nagsen Baburao Dhende	3,181	1.99%	New
Independent	Bankar Tukaram Genba	1,209	0.76%	New
Independent	Bhondave Sopan Jagannath	1,122	0.70%	New
Independent	Jagtap Suryakant Keshav	982	0.62%	New
Margin of victory		92,670	58.10%	▲50.14
Turnout		165,471	75.34%	▲10.70
Total valid votes		159,510		
Registered electors		219,630		▲10.54
INC gain from Independent		Swing	▲27.68	

=== Assembly Election 1990 ===
1990 Maharashtra Legislative Assembly election : Daund
Party	Candidate	Votes	%	±%
Independent	Subhash Baburao Kul	59,982	48.75%	New
INC	Jagdale Ushadevi Krishnarao	50,194	40.79%	▲7.85
BJP	Takawane Rajaram Bajirao	6,115	4.97%	New
JD	Wabale Hanumant Gulabrao	3,479	2.83%	New
RPI(K)	Ohol Bhausaheb Vakoba	2,406	1.96%	New
Margin of victory		9,788	7.96%	▼2.41
Turnout		125,399	63.11%	▲9.21
Total valid votes		123,042		
Registered electors		198,687		▲35.77
Independent gain from IC(S)		Swing	▲5.45	

=== Assembly Election 1985 ===
1985 Maharashtra Legislative Assembly election : Daund
Party	Candidate	Votes	%	±%
IC(S)	Ushadevi Krishnarao Jagdale	33,408	43.30%	New
INC	Ashok Bapurao Khalakdar	25,415	32.94%	New
Independent	Nanasaheb Tatyaba Pawar	16,124	20.90%	New
Independent	Hanuman Gulabrao Wabhale	1,343	1.74%	New
Margin of victory		7,993	10.36%	▼13.87
Turnout		78,488	53.63%	▲9.63
Total valid votes		77,150		
Registered electors		146,345		▲9.44
IC(S) gain from INC(U)		Swing	▼8.67	

=== Assembly Election 1980 ===
1980 Maharashtra Legislative Assembly election : Daund
Party	Candidate	Votes	%	±%
INC(U)	Jagadale Krishnarao Bajirao	29,944	51.97%	New
INC(I)	Kadam Fakkadrao Yeduji	15,981	27.74%	▲23.97
JP	Takawane Rajaram Bajirao	8,994	15.61%	▼18.72
Independent	Sadafule Chandrabhaga Rajabhau	1,924	3.34%	New
Independent	Waghmare Hari Chimaji	495	0.86%	New
Margin of victory		13,963	24.23%	▲13.68
Turnout		59,123	44.21%	▼20.63
Total valid votes		57,620		
Registered electors		133,720		▲8.58
INC(U) gain from JP		Swing	▲17.64	

=== Assembly Election 1978 ===
1978 Maharashtra Legislative Assembly election : Daund
Party	Candidate	Votes	%	±%
JP	Takawane Rajaram Bajirao	26,940	34.33%	New
INC	Krishna Rama Thorat	18,662	23.78%	New
Independent	Bhagwat Sitaram Vitthalrao	13,354	17.02%	New
Independent	Kataria Premsukh Kisandas	5,890	7.51%	New
Independent	Shantinath Maharaj	4,163	5.30%	New
INC(I)	Gade Anandrao Ramchandra	2,957	3.77%	New
Independent	Raj Salve	2,237	2.85%	New
Margin of victory		8,278	10.55%	
Turnout		80,744	65.56%	
Total valid votes		78,477		
Registered electors		123,158		
JP win (new seat)				
