= Bhor Assembly constituency =

Constituency of the Maharashtra legislative assembly in India

Coordinates: 18.14°N 73.84°E

Bhor
- Constituency No. 203 for the Maharashtra Legislative Assembly

Constituency details
- Country: India
- Region: Western India
- State: Maharashtra
- District: Pune
- Lok Sabha constituency: Baramati
- Established: 1951
- Total electors: 430,571
- Reservation: None

Member of Legislative Assembly
- 15th Maharashtra Legislative Assembly
- Incumbent Shankar Mandekar
- Party: NCP
- Alliance: NDA
- Elected year: 2024

Bhor Assembly constituency is one of the 288 Vidhan Sabha (legislative assembly) constituencies of Maharashtra state, western India. This constituency is located in Pune district. It is a part of Baramati Lok Sabha constituency.

While Anantrao Thopate has won this constituency 6-times, his son Sangram Thopate has won it 3 times. Both are members of the Indian National Congress.

== Geographical scope ==
The constituency comprises Mulshi taluka, Velhe taluka, Bhor taluka and ward nos. 157, 159 and 160 of Pune Municipal Corporation.

== Members of the Legislative Assembly ==
Year	Member	Party
1952	Namdeo Mohol	Indian National Congress
1957	Parashram Mali	Independent
1962	Shankar Bhelke	Indian National Congress
1967	Shankar Bhelke	Indian National Congress
1972	Anantrao Thopate	Independent
1978	Sampatrao Jedhe	Independent
1980	Anantrao Thopate	Indian National Congress (I)
1985	Anantrao Thopate	Indian National Congress
1990	Anantrao Thopate	Indian National Congress
1995	Anantrao Thopate	Indian National Congress
1999	Kashinath Khutwad	Nationalist Congress Party
2004	Anantrao Thopate	Indian National Congress
2009	Sangram Thopate	Indian National Congress
2014	Sangram Thopate	Indian National Congress
2019	Sangram Thopate	Indian National Congress
2024	Shankar Mandekar	Nationalist Congress Party

== Election results ==
=== Assembly Election 2024 ===
2024 Maharashtra Legislative Assembly election : Bhor
Party	Candidate	Votes	%	±%
NCP	Shankar Mandekar	126,455	43.63%	New
INC	Sangram Anantrao Thopate	1,06,817	36.86%	▼11.25
Independent	Kuldeep Sudam Konde	29,065	10.03%	New
Independent	Kiran Dattatray Dagade	25,601	8.83%	New
NOTA	None of the Above	2,720	0.94%	▲0.13
Margin of victory		19,638	6.78%	▲2.71
Turnout		2,92,547	67.94%	▲4.71
Total valid votes		2,89,827		
Registered electors		4,30,571		▲19.03
NCP gain from INC		Swing	▼4.47	

=== Assembly Election 2019 ===
2019 Maharashtra Legislative Assembly election : Bhor
Party	Candidate	Votes	%	±%
INC	Sangram Anantrao Thopate	108,925	48.10%	▲11.86
SS	Kuldeep Sudam Konde	99,719	44.04%	▲16.53
Independent	Aatmaram Jaywant Kalate	7,382	3.26%	New
VBA	Bhau Pandurang Margale	4,929	2.18%	New
MNS	Anil Prakash Matere	3,055	1.35%	New
NOTA	None of the Above	1,827	0.81%	▲0.00
Sambhaji Brigade Party	Pandharinath Sampat Sondkar	1,469	0.65%	New
Margin of victory		9,206	4.07%	▼4.67
Turnout		2,28,360	63.13%	▼5.56
Total valid votes		2,26,436		
Registered electors		3,61,734		▲13.70
INC hold		Swing	▲11.86	

=== Assembly Election 2014 ===
2014 Maharashtra Legislative Assembly election : Bhor
Party	Candidate	Votes	%	±%
INC	Sangram Anantrao Thopate	78,602	36.25%	▲5.13
SS	Kuldeep Sudam Konde	59,651	27.51%	▲6.18
NCP	Vikram Kashinath Khutwad	50,165	23.13%	New
BJP	Dhamale Sharad Bajirao	24,440	11.27%	New
NOTA	None of the Above	1,740	0.80%	New
BSP	Gaikwad Harshavardhan Arjun	1,533	0.71%	New
Independent	Kaluram Dnyanoba Jadhav	1,352	0.62%	New
Margin of victory		18,951	8.74%	▼1.05
Turnout		2,18,602	68.71%	▲1.44
Total valid votes		2,16,862		
Registered electors		3,18,160		▲11.88
INC hold		Swing	▲5.13	

=== Assembly Election 2009 ===
2009 Maharashtra Legislative Assembly election : Bhor
Party	Candidate	Votes	%	±%
INC	Sangram Anantrao Thopate	59,041	31.12%	▼24.04
SS	Dhamale Sharad Bajirao	40,461	21.32%	▼17.31
Independent	Dhumal Mansing Khanderao	26,676	14.06%	New
Independent	Darwatkar Revannath Krishna	20,899	11.01%	New
MNS	Garudkar Ravindra Baban	14,970	7.89%	New
Independent	Balasaheb Ramdas Chandere	14,696	7.75%	New
RPI(A)	Kadam Shrikant Raghu	4,611	2.43%	New
Margin of victory		18,580	9.79%	▼6.73
Turnout		1,89,928	66.79%	▼2.10
Total valid votes		1,89,744		
Registered electors		2,84,384		▲75.40
INC hold		Swing	▼24.04	

=== Assembly Election 2004 ===
2004 Maharashtra Legislative Assembly election : Bhor
Party	Candidate	Votes	%	±%
INC	Anantrao Thopate	61,536	55.15%	▲11.76
SS	Dhumal Mansing Khanderao	43,102	38.63%	▲34.23
Peoples Republican Party	Rohidas Dhondiba Jadhav	2,299	2.06%	New
Independent	Dnyaneshwar Tatyaba Shinde	2,173	1.95%	New
BSP	Gaikawad Suryakant Namadeo	1,921	1.72%	New
Margin of victory		18,434	16.52%	▲8.10
Turnout		1,11,607	68.84%	▲0.00
Total valid votes		1,11,575		
Registered electors		1,62,135		▲15.46
INC gain from NCP		Swing	▲3.34	

=== Assembly Election 1999 ===
1999 Maharashtra Legislative Assembly election : Bhor
Party	Candidate	Votes	%	±%
NCP	Kashinath Khutwad	50,063	51.81%	New
INC	Anantrao Thopate	41,926	43.39%	▼9.80
SS	Shobha Shrikant Pasalkar	4,249	4.40%	▼0.54
Margin of victory		8,137	8.42%	▼7.46
Turnout		1,00,712	71.72%	▼12.18
Total valid votes		96,630		
Registered electors		1,40,422		▲6.04
NCP gain from INC		Swing	▼1.38	

=== Assembly Election 1995 ===
1995 Maharashtra Legislative Assembly election : Bhor
Party	Candidate	Votes	%	±%
INC	Anantrao Thopate	57,055	53.19%	▼2.07
Independent	Kashinath Khutwad	40,023	37.31%	New
SS	Sanjay Dattatray Jagtap	5,298	4.94%	▼1.01
Independent	Kambale Ramesh Nana	1,651	1.54%	New
Independent	Khutwad Bhagwan Ramchandra	1,047	0.98%	New
Independent	Nalawade Dattatray Laxman	821	0.77%	New
Independent	Gaikwad Ashok Sopan	815	0.76%	New
Margin of victory		17,032	15.88%	▼16.45
Turnout		1,10,449	83.40%	▲10.02
Total valid votes		1,07,263		
Registered electors		1,32,427		▲0.55
INC hold		Swing	▼2.07	

=== Assembly Election 1990 ===
1990 Maharashtra Legislative Assembly election : Bhor
Party	Candidate	Votes	%	±%
INC	Anantrao Thopate	51,653	55.26%	▼11.89
Independent	Madhavrao Tapare	21,429	22.92%	New
JD	Ramnana Sonawane	8,583	9.18%	New
SS	Walgude Mansing Haribhau	5,561	5.95%	New
Independent	Y. G. Alias Abasaheb Shinde	2,918	3.12%	New
Independent	Kambale Ramesh Nana	1,332	1.42%	New
Independent	Khan Jabbar Mahitab	826	0.88%	New
Margin of victory		30,224	32.33%	▼3.60
Turnout		95,246	72.32%	▲0.42
Total valid votes		93,478		
Registered electors		1,31,702		▲19.91
INC hold		Swing	▼11.89	

=== Assembly Election 1985 ===
1985 Maharashtra Legislative Assembly election : Bhor
Party	Candidate	Votes	%	±%
INC	Anantrao Thopate	52,038	67.15%	New
IC(S)	Khatape Vasant Maruti	24,195	31.22%	New
Independent	Kunte Dhondiram Balwant	1,261	1.63%	New
Margin of victory		27,843	35.93%	▲27.57
Turnout		79,228	72.14%	▲5.59
Total valid votes		77,494		
Registered electors		1,09,831		▲12.24
INC gain from INC(I)		Swing	▲13.89	

=== Assembly Election 1980 ===
1980 Maharashtra Legislative Assembly election : Bhor
Party	Candidate	Votes	%	±%
INC(I)	Anantrao Thopate	33,856	53.26%	▲52.57
INC(U)	Sampatrao Ramchandra Jedhe	28,543	44.90%	New
Independent	Sadashiv Balu Kumbhar	732	1.15%	New
Independent	Ghadge Namdeo Pandurang	440	0.69%	New
Margin of victory		5,313	8.36%	▲7.58
Turnout		65,203	66.63%	▼5.73
Total valid votes		63,571		
Registered electors		97,854		▲8.19
INC(I) gain from Independent		Swing	▲10.68	

=== Assembly Election 1978 ===
1978 Maharashtra Legislative Assembly election : Bhor
Party	Candidate	Votes	%	±%
Independent	Jedhe Sampatrao Ramchandra	27,225	42.58%	New
INC	Anantrao Narayan Thopate	26,727	41.80%	▲7.38
Independent	Sonawane Pandharinath Shivram	8,252	12.91%	New
Independent	Kunte Dhondiram Balwant	866	1.35%	New
INC(I)	Bhosale Bhikaji Tukaram	442	0.69%	New
Independent	Awchare Bajirao	424	0.66%	New
Margin of victory		498	0.78%	▼25.94
Turnout		66,776	73.83%	▲12.17
Total valid votes		63,936		
Registered electors		90,445		▲18.11
Independent hold		Swing	▼18.56	

=== Assembly Election 1972 ===
1972 Maharashtra Legislative Assembly election : Bhor
Party	Candidate	Votes	%	±%
Independent	Anantrao Thopate	27,401	61.14%	New
INC	Chaudhari Usha Shamkant	15,425	34.42%	▼32.02
Independent	Adsol Krishna Namdeo	1,991	4.44%	New
Margin of victory		11,976	26.72%	▼15.73
Turnout		46,839	61.17%	▲5.58
Total valid votes		44,817		
Registered electors		76,578		▲8.23
Independent gain from INC		Swing	▼5.29	

=== Assembly Election 1967 ===
1967 Maharashtra Legislative Assembly election : Bhor
Party	Candidate	Votes	%	±%
INC	S. M. Bhelke	24,888	66.43%	▲2.57
SSP	Dadasaheb Anandrao Rajeshshirke	8,983	23.98%	New
Independent	M. K. Kambale	2,154	5.75%	New
ABJS	B. S. Bapat	1,438	3.84%	▼4.98
Margin of victory		15,905	42.46%	▼0.00
Turnout		41,869	59.17%	▲4.16
Total valid votes		37,463		
Registered electors		70,757		▼6.36
INC hold		Swing	▲2.57	

=== Assembly Election 1962 ===
1962 Maharashtra Legislative Assembly election : Bhor
Party	Candidate	Votes	%	±%
INC	Shankar Mahadeo Bhelke	23,543	63.86%	▲28.73
Independent	Jaysing Parashuram Mali	7,890	21.40%	New
ABJS	Dadasaheb Anandrao Rajeshshirke	3,251	8.82%	New
PSP	Yadavrao Krishna Konde	2,182	5.92%	New
Margin of victory		15,653	42.46%	▲12.73
Turnout		39,888	52.79%	▲5.44
Total valid votes		36,866		
Registered electors		75,565		▲13.19
INC gain from Independent		Swing	▼1.01	

=== Assembly Election 1957 ===
1957 Bombay State Legislative Assembly election : Bhor
Party	Candidate	Votes	%	±%
Independent	Mali Jayasing Parasharam	18,773	64.87%	New
INC	Mohoi Namdeo Sadashiv	10,168	35.13%	New
Margin of victory		8,605	29.73%	
Turnout		28,941	43.35%	
Total valid votes		28,941		
Registered electors		66,760		
Independent win (new seat)				
