= Sambhajirao Kakade =

Indian politician (1931–2021)

Sambhajirao Kakade Deshmukh

Personal details
- Born: 8 September 1931
- Died: 10 May 2021 (aged 89)
- Party: Indian National Congress
- Occupation: Politician

Sambhajirao Sahebrao Kakade Deshmukh (8 September 1931 – 10 May 2021) was an Indian politician who was elected from Baramati to the 6th and 8th Lok Sabha as a member of the Janata Party.

== Early life ==
Sambhajirao is son of Sahebrao Kakade who was one of the key founders of the Someshwar Sugar Co-operative factory near Baramati. The Kakade family, and the family of NCP leader, Sharad Pawar have been rivals in the politics of Baramati and the local cooperative societies over generations.

== Family ==
Sambhajirao was the patriarch of a political clan with three sons. Many of his clan and their relations through matrimonial alliances are active in the politics of Maharashtra. Sambhajirao Kakade was also called Lalasaheb.

== Career ==
Like most politicians from Western Maharashtra, Sambhajirao was active in the cooperative sector all his life. Early in his career he belonged to the united Congress party. Upon the split in the party in 1969, he joined the Congress(O) rather than the Congress(R) faction of prime minister Indira Gandhi. He failed in his bid to win the Baramati Lok Sabha seat in the 1971 general election. In the Lok Sabha elections of 1977 after the emergency, he contested the Baramati seat again as the candidate of the opposition Janata alliance and won the seat. He lost it in the 1980 elections but regained it in the 1985 by-polls elections.
