= Karha =

Karha may refer to:

- Karha (Sikhism), a type of iron bracelet worn by Sikh people
- Karha (spices), a mix of spices used to make a form of tea
- Karha River, a river flowing through the state of Maharashtra in India
