= Punyabhushan =

- Awarded for: Eminent personality from the field of art, music, culture, science, industry, social service, or sports in a special public function
- Sponsored by: Punyabhushan Foundation, Pune
- Location: Pune, Maharashtra, India
- Rewards: Citation, memento and ₹2 lakh
- First award: 1989
- Most recent winner: Abhay Firodia (2026)
- Website: www.punyabhushan.com

The Punyabhushan award (translation: Jewel of Pune) is awarded every year to an eminent personality from the field of art, music, culture, science, industry, social service, or sports in a special public function in the city of Pune, Maharashtra, India.

The award is announced every year by the Punyabhushan Foundation on 23 March with a view to commemorate the memory of Indian revolutionary martyrs Bhagat Singh, Sukhdev, and Rajguru. Alongside the main award, the foundation felicitates serving soldiers and veteran freedom fighters at the presentation ceremony.

== List of awardees ==
The recipients of the Punyabhushan are:

Year	Name	Field of Work
1989	Bhimsen Joshi	Music
1990	Dinkar Kelkar	Archaeology
1991	Shantanurao Kirloskar	Industry
1992	Banoo Coyaji	Medicine
1993	P. L. Deshpande	Literature, drama and arts
1994	Babasaheb Purandare	History
1995	B. K. S. Iyengar	Yoga
1996	R. N. Dandekar	Oriental studies
1997	Mohan Dharia	Environmentalism
1998	Jayant Narlikar	Astronomy
1999	Pratap Godse	Social work
2000	Chandu Borde	Sport
2001	Jayantrao Tilak	Journalism
2002	Jabbar Patel	Drama and film
2003	Rahul Bajaj	Industry
2004	K. B. Grant	Medicine
2005	Rohini Bhate	Dance
2006	Baba Adhav	Labour union activism
2007	Shreeram Lagoo	Marathi drama and film
2008	Raghunath Mashelkar	Science
2009	S. B. Mujumdar	Education
2010	R. C. Dhere	Literature
2011	H. V. Sardesai	Medicine
2012	Nirmala Purandare	Women and child welfare
2013	Sudhir Gadgil	Anchoring and compering
2014	Cyrus Poonawalla	Serum and vaccinations
2015	Pratap Pawar	Journalism and media
2016	Bhai Vaidya	Socialist activism
2017	K. H. Sancheti	Medicine
2018	Prabha Atre	Classical music
2019	G. B. Deglurkar	Indian archaeology
2021	Baba Kalyani	Industry
2022	Nitin Desai	Entrepreneurship and social activism
2023	Mohan Agashe	Drama and film
2024	Vijay Bhatkar	Information technology
2025	Vijay Kelkar	Economics
2026	Abhay Firodia	Automobile industry
