= Shah Muntoji Brahmani =

Muslim Marathi saint-poet (1575–1650)

- Born: 1575; Bidar, India
- Died: 1650 (aged 74–75)
- Other name: Mrutyunjay Swami
- Occupation: Muslim Marathi saint-poet

Shah Muntoji Brahmani (1575–1650), also known by his spiritual title Mrutyunjay Swami, was a Muslim Marathi saint-poet. Born into the royal family of the Bahmani Sultanate in Bidar, traditional biographical accounts consider him to have been a ruler of Bidar prior to renouncing his throne. In addition to his birth name, he was known by several names, including Muntoji Bamani, Shah Mutbaji Qadri, Jnanasagaranand, and Jnanasagar Ayya.

== Life ==
=== Early life and renunciation ===
Shah Muntoji was born into the Bahmani royal family in Bidar and spent his early life enjoying royal opulence. According to local narratives, a turning point in his life occurred while he was living in Bidar. Sitting on an upper balcony with his wife, Muntoji was eating bananas and discarding the peels below. A beggar arrived and began eating the discarded peels with great relish. Enraged by this sight, Muntoji ordered his guards to beat the beggar severely.

Despite being beaten, the beggar began laughing loudly, which astonished the king. When Muntoji questioned him, the beggar began to weep. Asked to explain his sudden shift from laughter to tears, the beggar stated that if consuming mere banana peels resulted in such severe punishment, he wondered how much greater punishment the king would face in the future for consuming the fruit itself; he explained that this realization amused him, while pity for the king's ultimate fate made him cry. Deeply moved by the beggar's words, Muntoji surrendered all his royal possessions and became an ascetic (yogi).

=== Spiritual journey ===
In search of spiritual enlightenment, Muntoji consulted various holy men. Muslim spiritual figures advised him to offer Namaz and keep Roza (fasting), whereas Hindu ascetics encouraged him to undertake the Pandharpur Wari. Muntoji chose to travel to Pandharpur, joining the gathering of Vaishnavas.

He later accepted Sahajanand, a preceptor of the Anand Sampradaya, as his guru. Sahajanand imparted spiritual initiation upon him, bestowed the name "Mrutyunjay", and instructed him to reside at Narayanpur. Muntoji constructed a hut at Narayanpur, where he spent the rest of his life. Numerous miracles were attributed to him during his time in Narayanpur, where he eventually died.

== Death and memorial ==
Following his death, the site of his hut in Narayanpur came under the possession of local Muslims. A shrine was established at the location, known as the Dargah of Murtaja Qadri. According to the Islamic calendar, an annual Urs fair is celebrated at his tomb on the 21st day of Ramadan.

== Religious identity and philosophy ==
Muntoji held the sectarian name Jnanasagaranand within the Anand Sampradaya. It is conjectured that prior to his initiation into the Anand Sampradaya, he may have been a follower of the Qadri branch of Sufism. Because he was also referred to as "Jnanasagar Ayya", some researchers connect his background to the Lingayat tradition.

Literary analysis indicates that his writings were noticeably influenced by Mukundraj's Vivekasindhu, leading scholars to place his works within the literary tradition of Mukundraj.

== Literary works ==
Muntoji's language is described as highly Sanskritized and ornate. He authored several treatises, abhangas, and devotional songs (padas). His attributed works include Siddhasanketprabandha, Anubhavasara (also known as Amrutasara), Adwaitaprakasha, Swarupasamadhana, Prakashadeepa, Jivoddharana, Amrtanubhava Panchikarana and Guruleela.

His treatise Panchikarana was written in Dakhini Hindi.
