= Waghapur, Pune =

Village in Maharashtra

Waghapur
- Village
- Location in Maharashtra, India
- Coordinates: 18°23′51″N 74°7′36″E
- Country: India
- State: Maharashtra
- District: Pune

Area
  - Total: 11.21 km^{2} (4.33 sq mi)

Languages
  - Official: Marathi
- Time zone: UTC+5:30 (IST)
- PIN: 412104
- Telephone code: 02115, 912115
- Vehicle registration: MH 12
- Nearest city: Saswad, Pune
- Lok Sabha constituency: Baramati
- Vidhan Sabha: Purandar

Waghapur village is located in Purandar Tehsil of Pune district in Maharashtra, India. It is situated 15 km away from sub-district headquarter Saswad and 43 km away from district headquarter Pune.

Waghapur is 16 kilometers from Jejuri, 15 kilometers from Saswad, and 14 kilometers from Uruli Kanchan.

The total geographical area of village is 1121 hectares. Waghapur has a total population of 2,177 peoples. There are about 513 houses in Waghapur village.

The district administration along with the officials from the Airport Authority of India (AAI) and Maharashtra Airport Development Company (MADC) have shown keen interest on the site in Waghapur and Rajewadi for the proposed Pune international airport.
