= Banoo Jehangir Coyaji =

Indian physician (1917–2004)

- Born: 7 September 1917; Mumbai, India
- Died: 15 July 2004 (aged 86)
- Education: Grant Medical College
- Known for: Family Planning; Population Control; Social Service
- Awards: Padma Bhushan; Magsaysay Award
- Scientific career
- Fields: Medicine
- Workplaces: King Edward Memorial Hospital, Pune

Banoo Jehangir Coyaji (7 September 1917 – 15 July 2004) was an Indian physician and activist in family planning and population control. She was director of King Edward Memorial Hospital in Pune, and started programmes of community health workers in rural areas of Maharashtra, the third largest state in India. She became an advisor to the union government and an internationally recognised expert.

== Biography ==
=== Early life ===
Banoo Pestonji Kapadia was born in Mumbai on 7 September 1917 into a Parsi family. Her father was a well known civil engineer by the name of Pestonji Kapadia. At a young age, Banoo was sent to live with her grandparents in Pune where she experienced a life of wealth and luxury. Her parents' constant visits and her close relationship with her grandparents led her to live a self-proclaimed fulfilled childhood.

=== Education ===
While living with her grandparents, Banoo became the first girl to matriculate from St. Vincent's, an all boys school, and attended the Convent of Jesus and Mary where she often placed first in rankings. After her schooling at the Convent, Banoo took the Senior Cambridge and passed with distinction in five classes. She went on to do pre-medical sources at St. Xaviers College and then studied medicine at Grant Medical College where she graduated with an M.D. degree in 1940. Banoo trained to become a gynecologist during her residency with the renowned Dr. V.N. Shirodkar but pursued general practice under Dr. Edulji Coyaji when she returned to Pune in 1943.

=== Marriage ===
When Banoo visited Mahabaleshwar in 1937, she was introduced to her future husband Jehangir Coyaji by Edulji Coyaji, Banoo's mentor and Jehangir's brother. Jehangir was an engineer by trade and had recently completed his degree at Purdue University. Banoo and Jehangir were married on 24 February 1941, five years after they began their courtship. On 7 August 1942, the couple had their first child, a boy by the name of Kurus. In 1943, they went on to build a house in Pune and settled there.

== Professional life ==
In April 1944, Sardar Moodliar requested Dr. Edulji Coyaji to recommend a highly trained doctor capable of taking over the King Edward Memorial Hospital (KEM), a small maternal care hospital located in Pune. Dr. Edulji Coyaji suggested Dr. Banoo Jehangir Coyaji for the job and six months later, she assumed the position of Chief Medical Officer. In her 55 years in this role, Banoo grew the hospital from 40 beds in 1944 to 550 beds in 1999. She also transformed KEM into a teaching hospital and research institute and established an affiliation with B. J. Medical College.

Banoo also developed a primary health center in Vadu in 1972 that eventually grew into a hospital catering nearby rural areas. In 1977, she created a program directed towards improving rural community healthcare. She trained approximately 600 girls in matters of hygiene, family planning, and nutrition so they could assist their communities. Over time, Banoo's model was adopted in locations across the country. Furthermore, Banoo realized the lack of education and workforce skills in many young women and mothers. As a response to this crisis, she founded the Young Women's Health and Development Project in 1988. This project was aimed at teaching young women necessary skills such as reading and embroidery, and supplementing these skills with conversations about caste and gender roles.

Banoo was a member of the Scientific and Technical Group in Human Reproduction, WHO, Women's Health and Development, and Health, Manpower and Development at WHO. She was a Consultant to the Government of Maharashtra, the Government of India, the World Bank, Ford Foundation, UNFPA and many other bodies of national and international importance. She was also a member of the Management Council as well as Professor Emeritus, Pune University. Her major contribution has been in the areas of family planning, urban and rural health and children's health.

== Awards and recognition ==
- 1989 – Padma Bhushan
- 1992 – Punyabhushan Award
- 1993 – Ramon Magsaysay Award for Public Service

== Interests ==
Banoo had a persistent interest in literature that was passed on to her from her father. She pursued this interest through her involvement in the Sakal Group of Newspapers as its director for 30 years. In addition to this, she obtained honorary degrees in literature in 1994 from the University of Pune and SNDT University.

She also learned Western classical music during her time at the Convent of Jesus and Mary and enjoyed playing piano at her grandparents' house. Banoo performed for examiners from London's Trinity College of Music.

In addition to literature and music, Banoo enjoyed attending parties and ballroom dancing with her husband, Jehangir.
