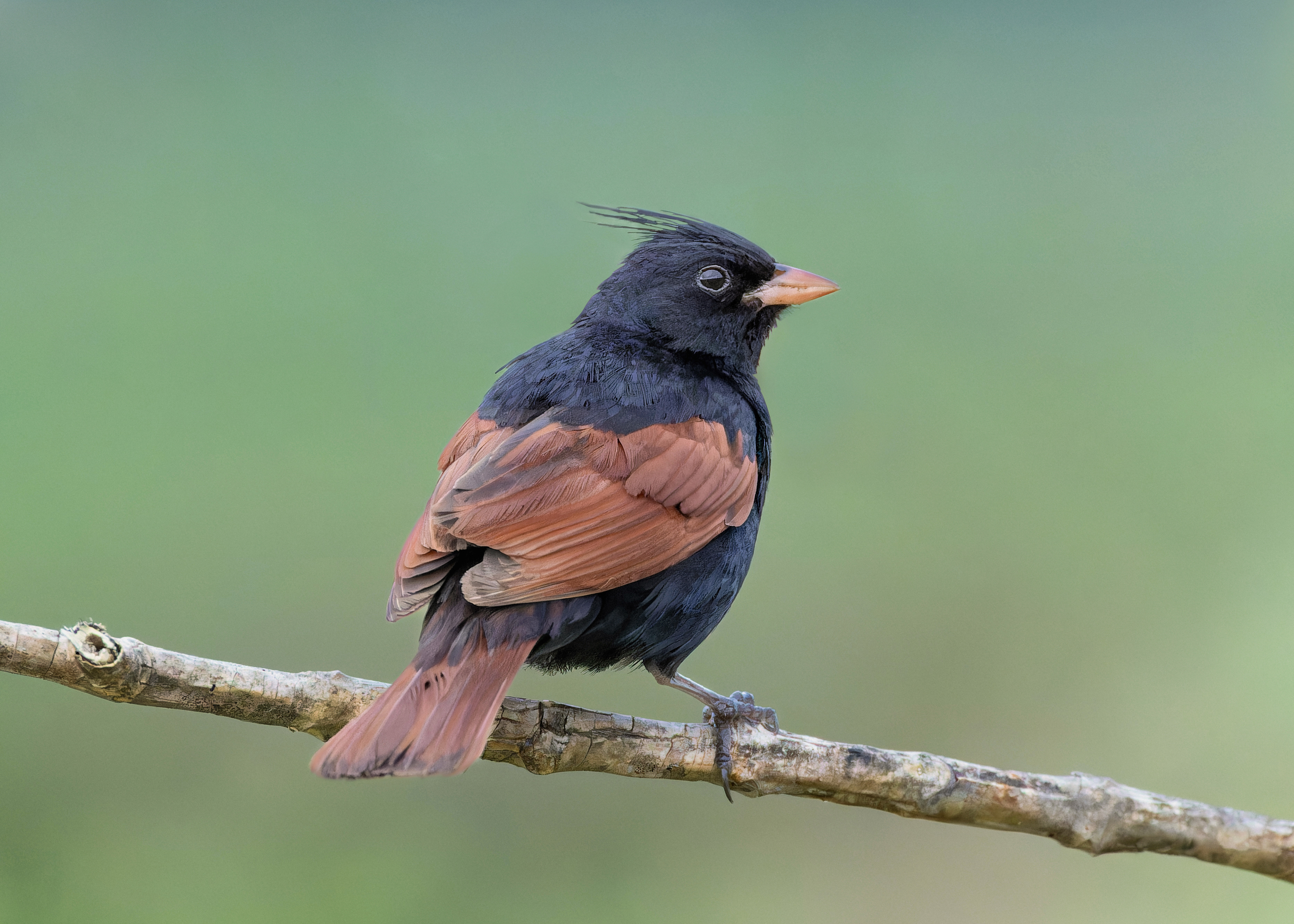
- Crested bunting (''Melophus lathami) (Male)

Scientific classification
- Kingdom: Animalia
- Phylum: Chordata
- Class: Aves
- Order: Passeriformes
- Family: Emberizidae
- Genus: Melophus; Swainson, 1837

Type species
- Emberiza erythropterus Jardine & Selby, 1833=Emberiza lathami Gray, 1831

= Melophus =

Genus of birds

Melophus is a genus of small Old World passerine birds in the family Emberizidae. The three species now placed in the genus were formerly placed in the genus Emberiza.

== Taxonomy ==
The genus Melophus was introduced in 1837 by the English zoologist William Swainson to accommodate a single species, Emberiza erythropterus, that had been formally described in 1833 by the English naturalists William Jardine and Prideaux John Selby. The name Emberiza erythropterus is a junior synonym of Emberiza lathami, the crested bunting, that had been introduced in 1831 by the English zoologist John Edward Gray. The genus name Melophus combines the Ancient Greek μέλας/mélas (genitive μέλανος/mélanos), meaning "black", and λόφος/lóphos, meaning "crest".

The genus was formerly synonymized with the genus Emberiza that had been introduced by Linnaeus in 1858, but based on a molecular genetic study published in 2021, the genus was resurrected to contain three species.

The genus contains the following three species:

Male	Female	Common name	Scientific name	Distribution
		Crested bunting	Melophus lathami	northern Pakistan to southeastern Tibet, southern China, Laos, and northern Vietnam (Tonkin)
		Black-headed bunting	Melophus melanocephalus	breeds south-central Eurasia; winters to India
		Red-headed bunting	Melophus bruniceps	breeds south-central Eurasia; winters in Indian subcontinent
