= Uttam Kamble =

Indian journalist (born 1956)

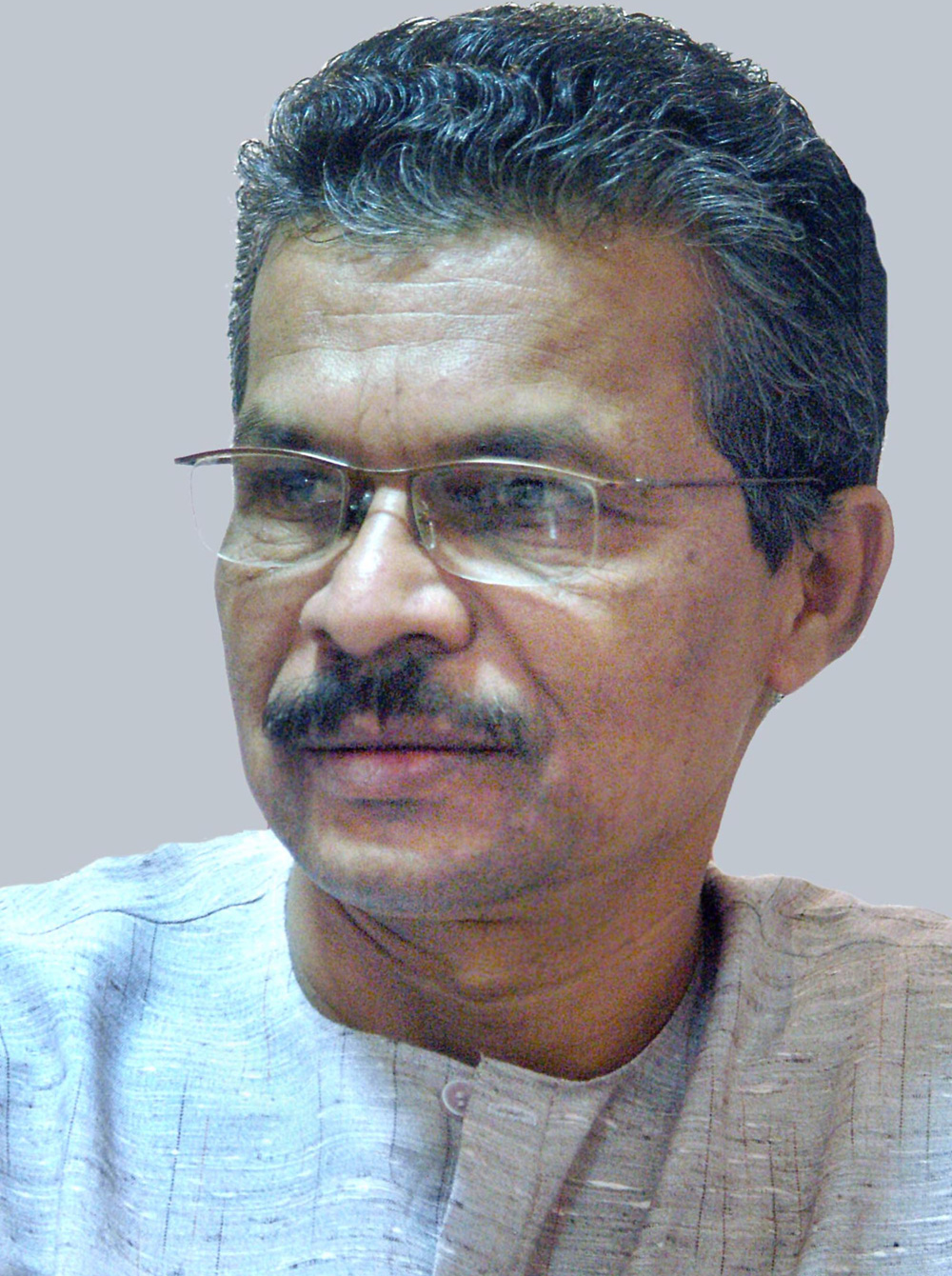
- Born: 31 May 1956 (age 70); Shirguppi, Chikkodi, Belagum, Karnataka, India
- Education: Shivaji University, Kolhapur
- Occupations: Journalist, writer, poet

Uttam Kamble is an Indian journalist and the chief editor of Sakal Media Group. He is the author of around 63 published books. Through a journalism career of over three decades, he is best known for his writings focused on the oppressed and deprived class. He was also the President of the 84th Akhil Bhartiya Marathi Sahitya Sammelan literary conference, and inaugurated the 16th Kamgar Sahitya Sammelan in the Satara district of Maharashtra in February 2011, presided over by Ramdas Phutane.

== Early life ==
Uttam Kamble was born on 31 May 1956 into poverty in a rural area of Chikkodi Taluka in the Belagum district of Karnataka.He came from a humble background and his mother was not so educated, and Uttam used to help her with her work during his childhood. He was the first person in his family to receive an education. During his youth, he worked various jobs including sales and as a paper-boy, while still continuing with his education.

== Career ==
Uttam Kamble graduated from Shivaji University, Kolhapur, Maharashtra in 1978 with a Bachelor of Arts (Political Science) degree. After graduation in 1979, he joined a small daily newspaper named Samaj (Marathi: समाज). He joined the Sakal Group in 1982 and remained there for the rest of his career.

== Books ==
=== Novels ===
- SHRADDHA (Marathi: श्राद्ध ): Posthumous Rituals (Three Editions) (1st edition 24 March 1986)
- ASWASTHA NAYAK (Marathi: अस्वस्थ नायक): Anguished Hero (1st edition 26 January 2000)
- PANNAS TAKKYANCHI THAS THAS MARATHI (July 2014)
- SHEVTUN AALA MAANUS (2015)
- BUDDHACHA RAHAAT (Three Editions) (2015)
- MIRAVNUK (2016)
- Koytyawarcha Kok (Two Editions)
- WAT TUDAVTANA (6th editions:25 July 2011)

=== Collections of short stories ===
- Rang Mansanche (Marathi: रंग माणसांचे): (Colors of Human Beings) (1995)
- Katha Mansanchya (Marathi: कथा माणसांच्या): (Stories of Human Beings) (2001)
- Kavale Ani Manase (Marathi: कावळे आणि माणसे): (Crows and Humans) (1998)
- Na Disnari Ladhai(Marathi: न दिसणारी लढाई): (The Unseen Battle) (2008)
- Paratya (Marathi: परत्या): (The Returnee) (2010)
- Pardhyachi Gaay (2018)
