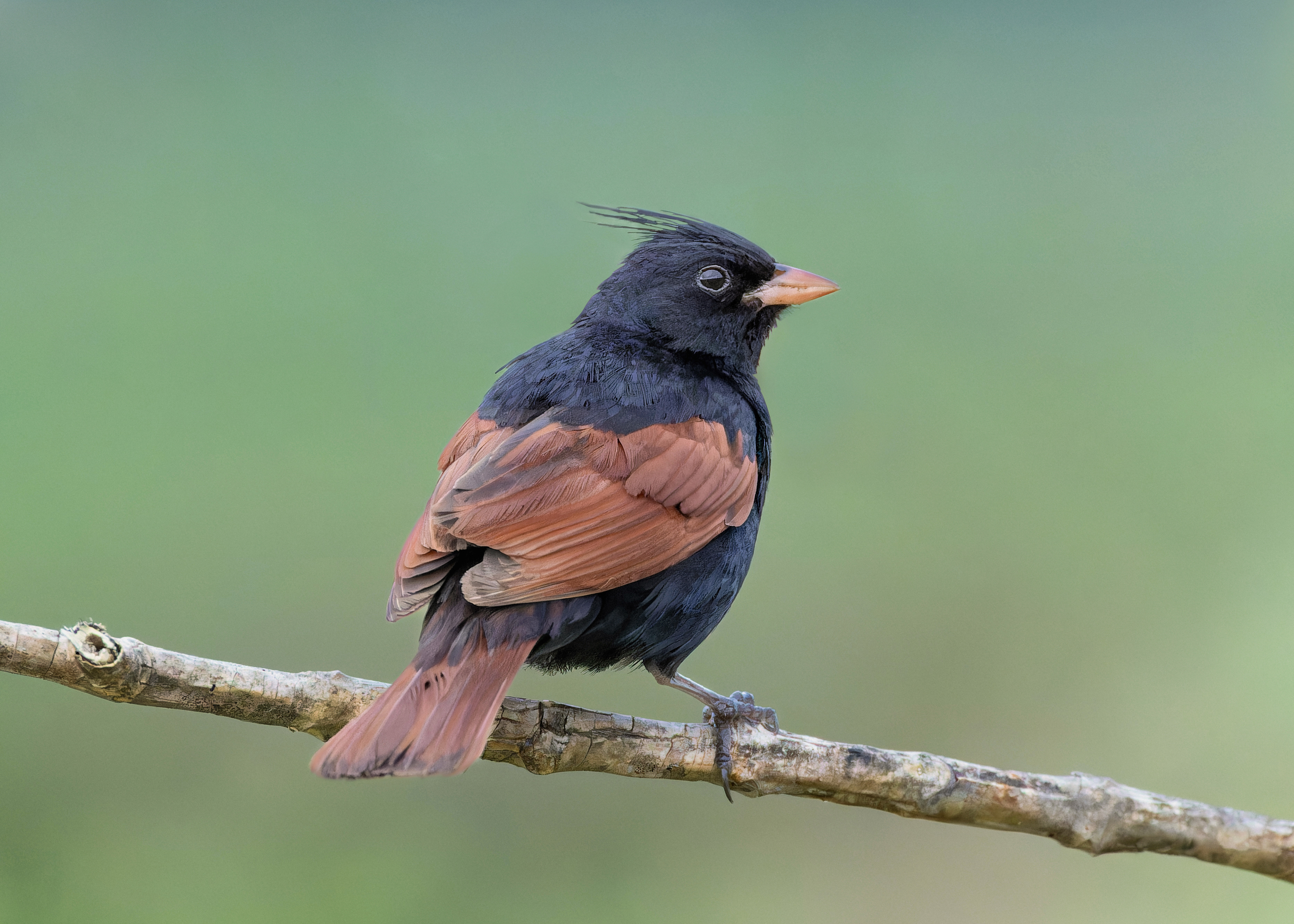
- Male in Saswad, Maharashtra, India.
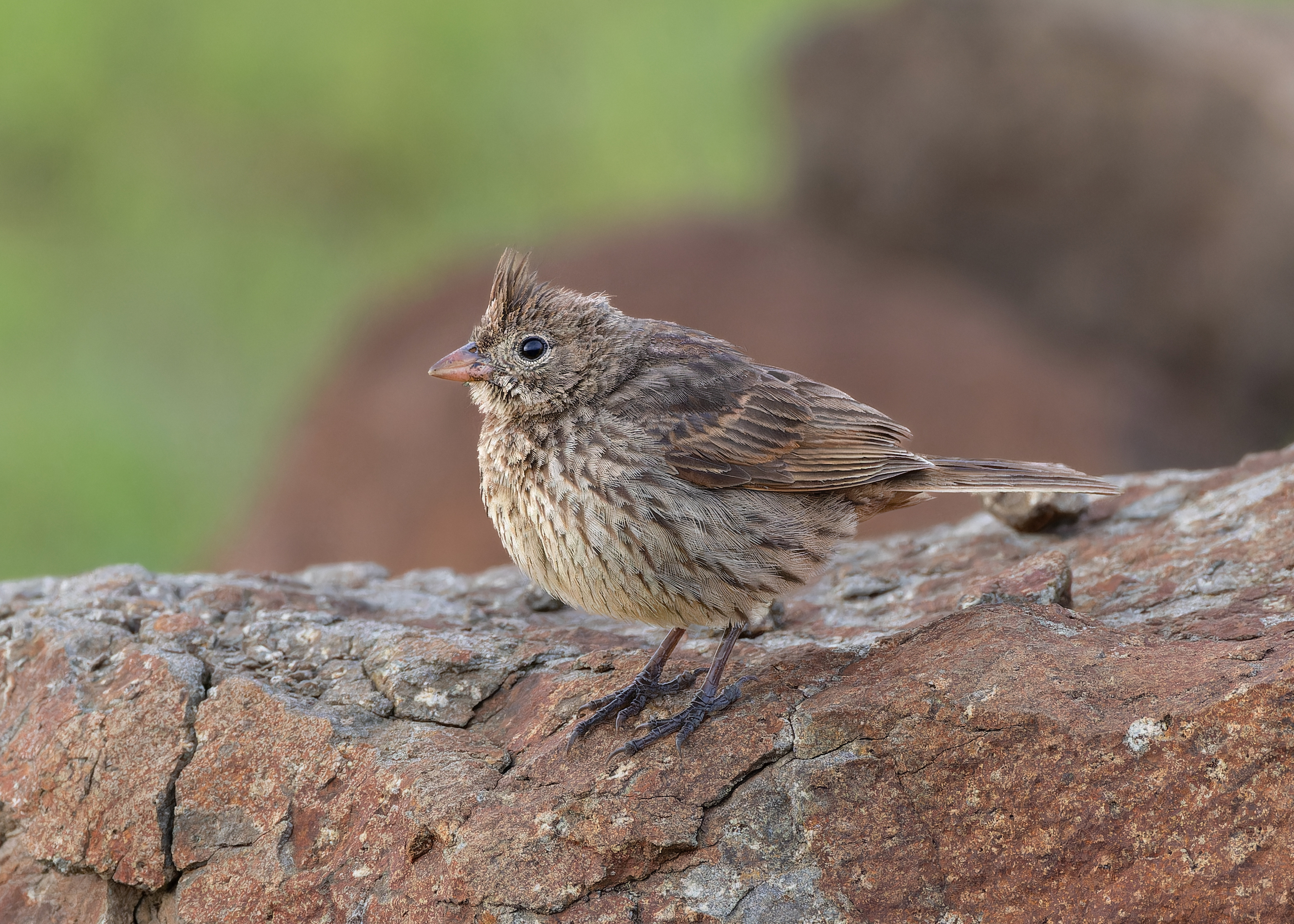
- Female in Saswad, Maharashtra, India.

Conservation status
- Least Concern (IUCN 3.1)

Scientific classification
- Kingdom: Animalia
- Phylum: Chordata
- Class: Aves
- Order: Passeriformes
- Family: Emberizidae
- Genus: Melophus
- Species: M. lathami

Binomial name
- Melophus lathami (Gray, JE, 1831)

Synonyms
- Emberiza cristata Vigors, 1831; Fringilla melanictera Gmelin, 1788

= Crested bunting =

Species of bird

The crested bunting (Melophus lathami) is a species of bird in the family Emberizidae. It is sparrow sized with males having rufous wings and tail on a black body and females being less contrastingly coloured in dull brown. Both males and females have the distinctive crest. The species was formerly placed in an monotypic genus Melophus on account of its crest, unique among the buntings. It was subsequently moved to the genus Emberiza and then in 2026 returned to the genus Melophus together with two other species. The species has a wide but scattered distribution in Asia. They are found in mostly open and dry habitats over a range of altitudes. Populations in the higher elevations of the Himalayas show seasonal altitudinal movements. They are more gregarious in winter.

== Description ==
Males have a prominent crest, yellowish beak, black body plumage contrasting with the rufous flight feathers of the wing and tail. Females are shorter crested and have an overall dull-olive brown colour with dark brown streaks. The wing and tail feathers are fringed in cinnamon. Females have a grey beak. Non-breeding males are buffish grey and subadults have black tips to the rufous primary coverts.

The species was formerly placed in the monotypic genus Melophus but DNA sequence based phylogenies showed it to be nested within other Emberiza species. They are considered to be monotypic even though peninsular Indian populations have been given the subspecies name subcristata with no external morphological characters differentiating them from the other populations. They have been found to have 40 pairs of chromosomes.

In 2026 this species was returned to the resurrected genus Melophus based on the results of a 2021 molecular genetic study.

== Distribution ==
Crested buntings are found along the Himalayas in India where they move altitudinally with the seasons. They are also found across the plains of India south of the Himalayas extending west to Gujarat and Rajasthan. They are also found in parts of central and peninsular India extending east along the Himalayas into China, Laos, Thailand, Vietnam and Indonesia.

They are found in open thorny scrub, rocky dry hillsides, grassland and savannah. They become more gregarious in winter forming flocks sometimes foraging with other finches, buntings and larks. They visit small waterbodies in the mornings and late afternoons.

== Behaviour ==
During the breeding season, males sing from atop tall plants. A courtship display involving the male fanning and cocking its tail, raising the wing on one side and walking around a female has been observed. In captivity a male picks up some nesting material and walks around the female in circles with bowed wings and fanned tail. The birds feed mainly on seeds of various plants but will take termite alates. The foraging groups keep in contact with short piping calls.

They breed in summer (experiments in captivity show that they respond to long daylength) building a cup nest made of fine fibre and hair placed on the ground in a stone wall or sheltered by a rock. The clutch consists of 3 to 4 white eggs with greenish to reddish spots being more dense on the broad end.

In China, an olive-backed sunbird nesting close to a crested bunting fed the young of the crested bunting. Trapping of birds by hunters for food has been documented in southern Nepal.

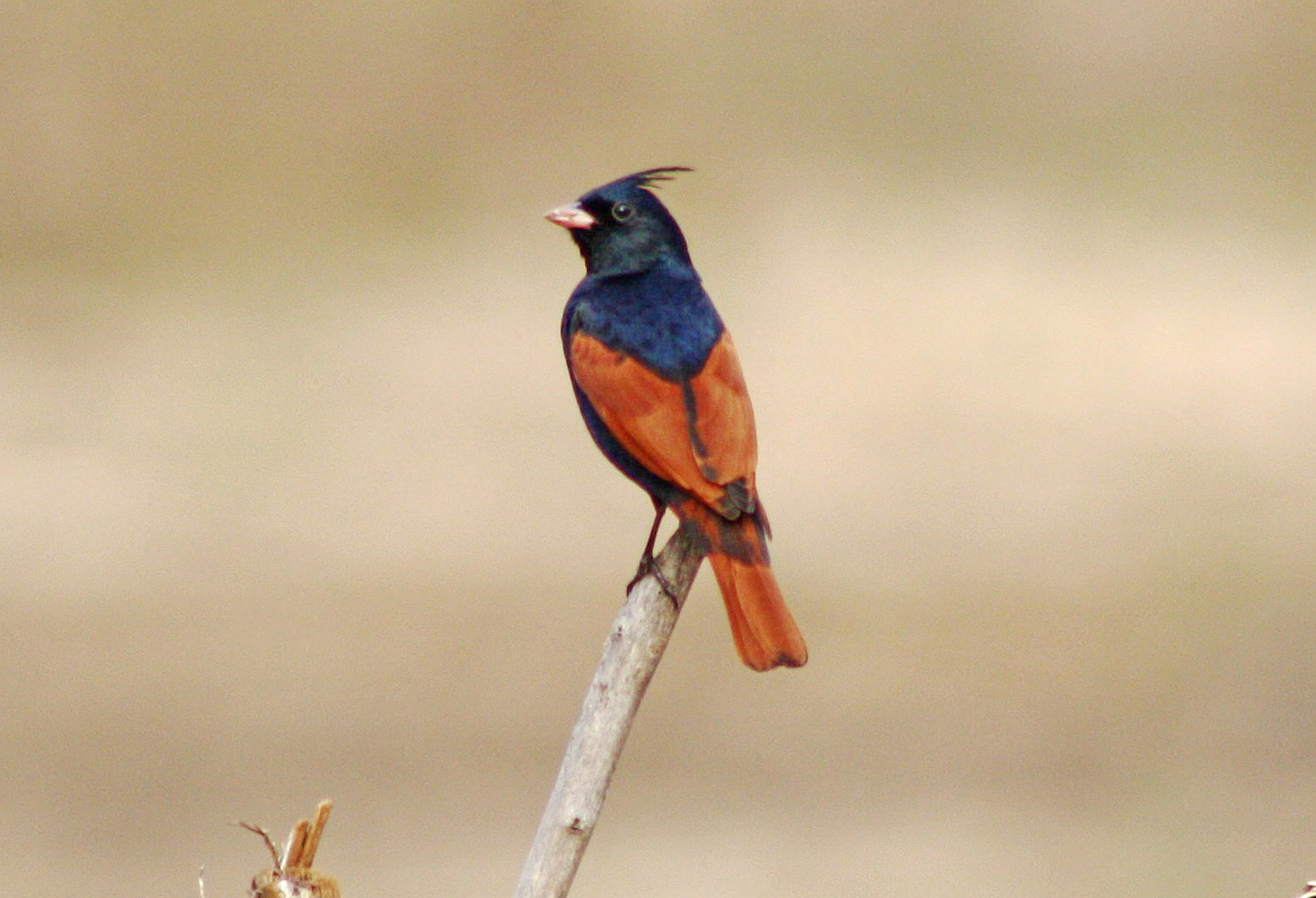

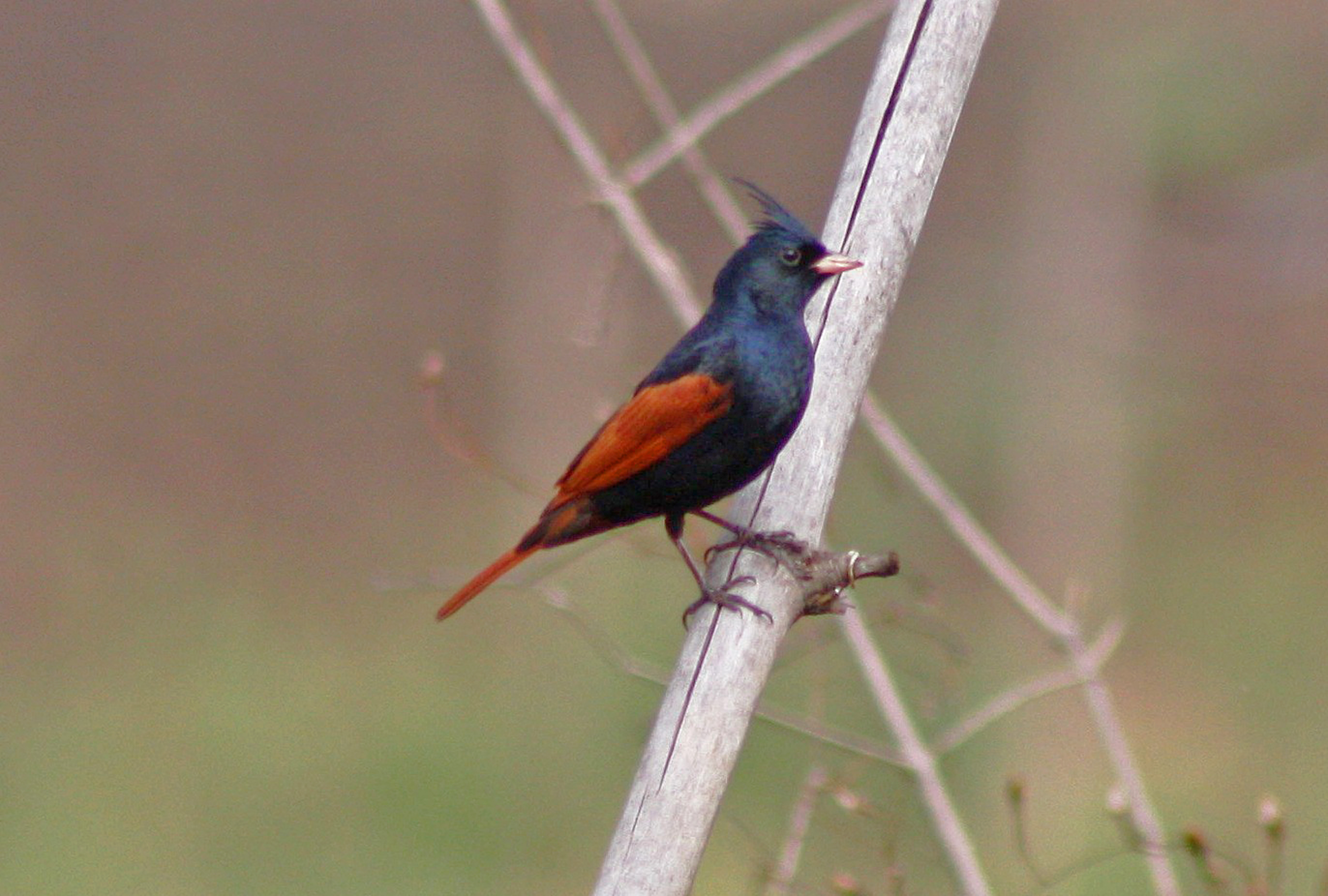
In Maharashtra

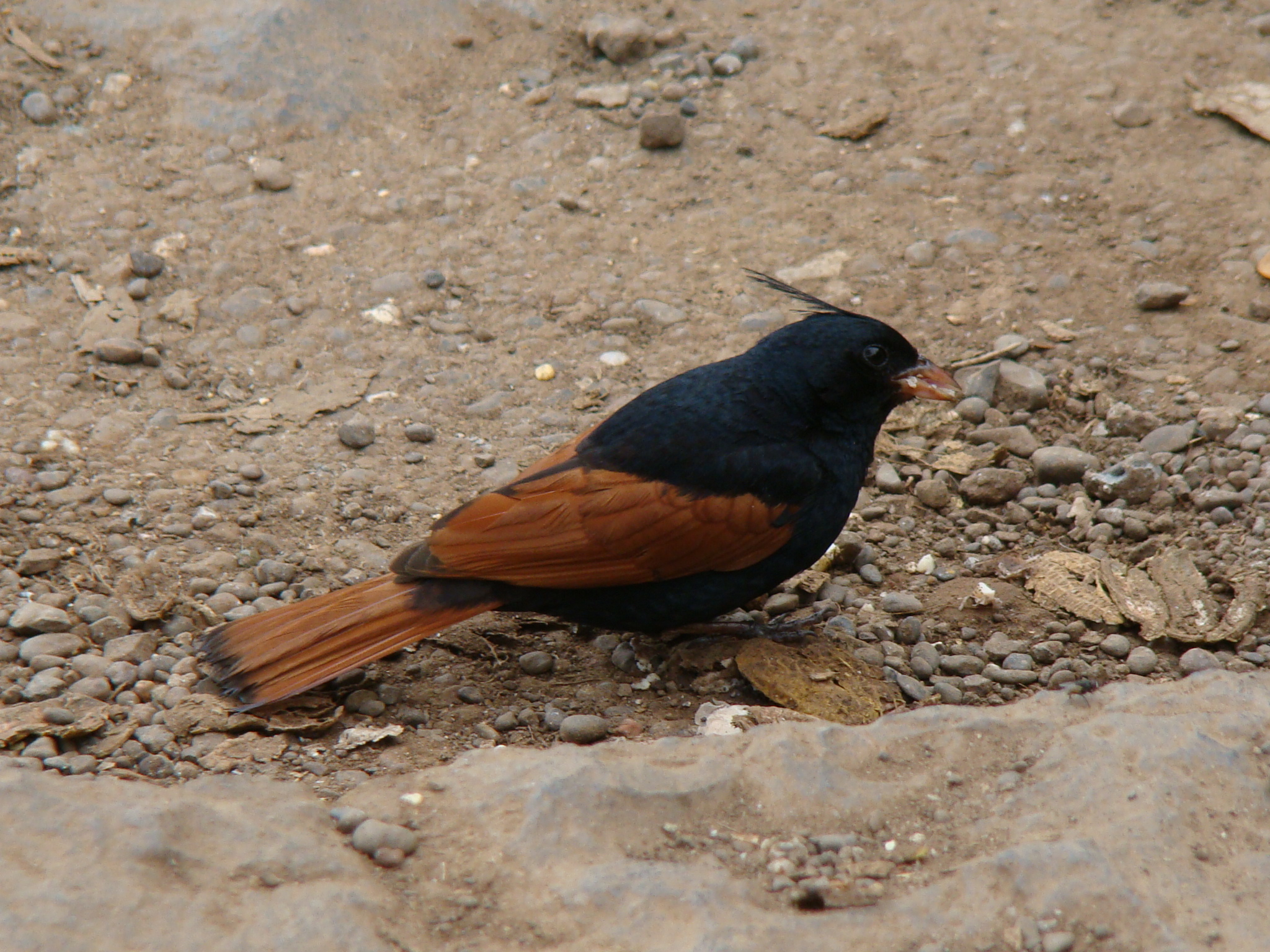
In Pune

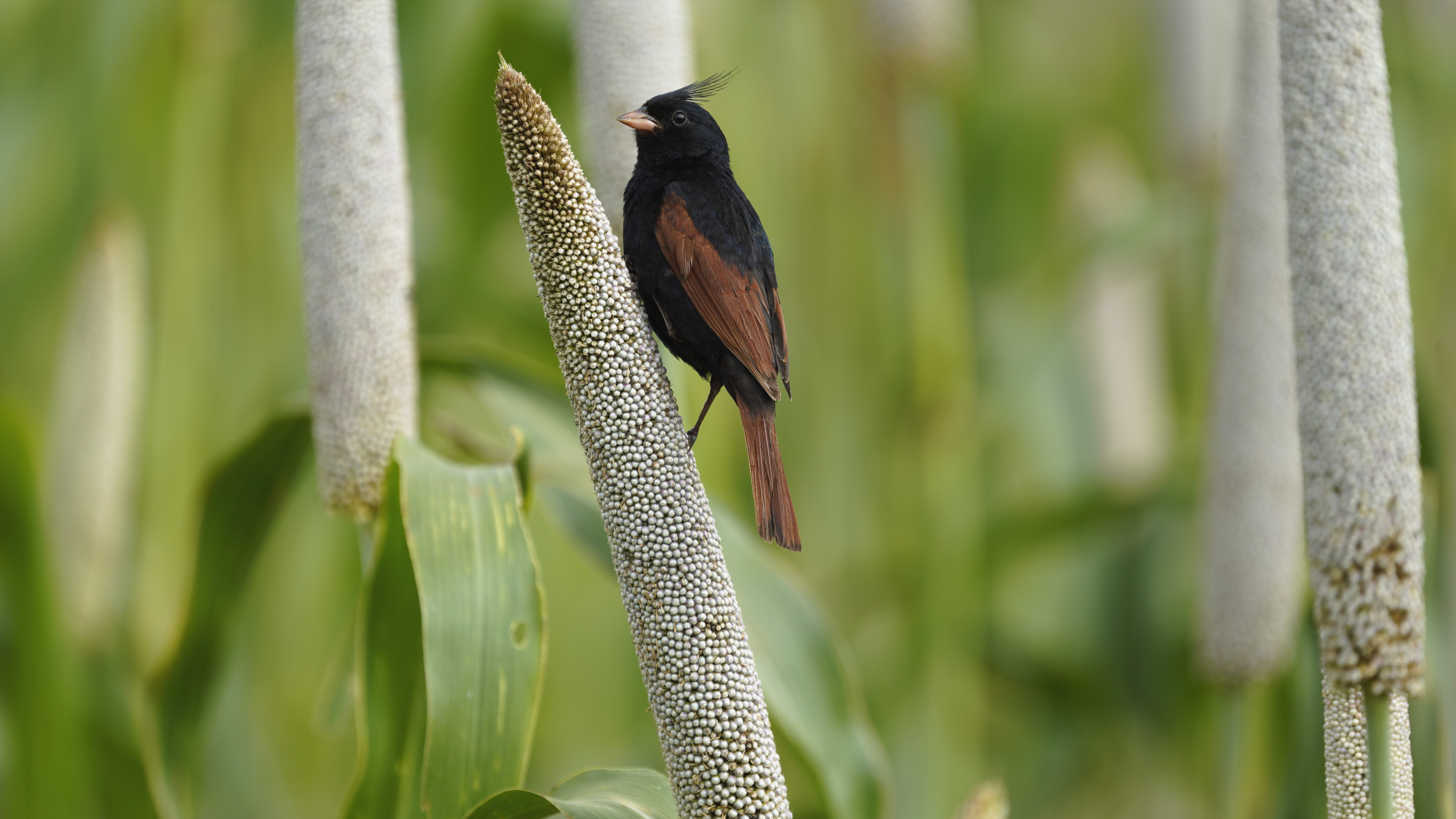
In Pune
