= Purandare =

Surname

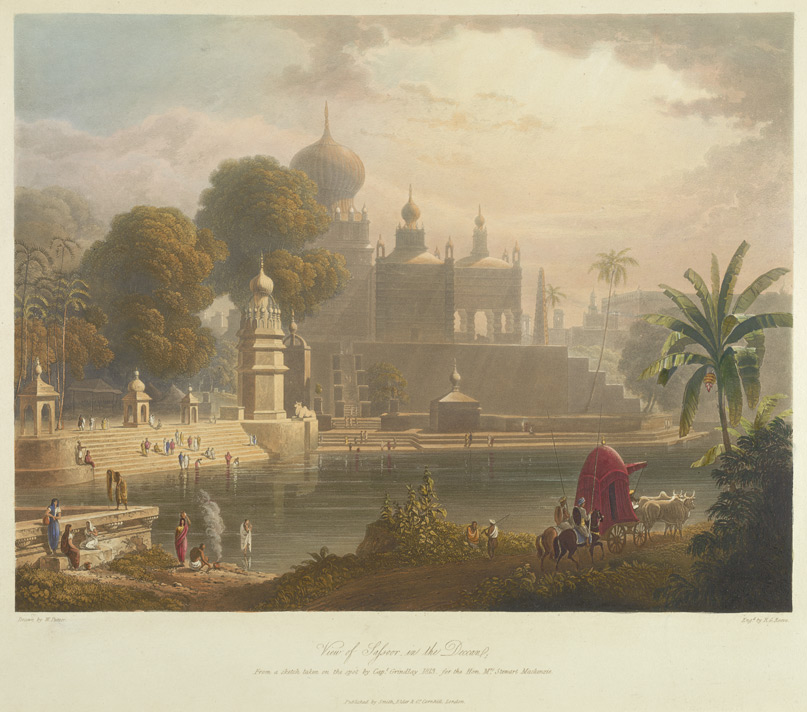
Saswad from the Sangameshwar temple in 1813 by British artist Robert Melville Grindlay. The Purandare palace can be seen in the background.

Purandare is a prominent Indian family of Nobles, Sardars, Patil, Jagirdars during Maratha Empire. They belong to Deshastha Rigvedi Brahmin (DRB) community. The kuldevi of Purandares is Mahalakshmi of Kolhapur and their Kuldeva is Khandoba of Jejuri. Dhondo Malhar Purandare, a member of Purandare family held the patilki watan of Vadule, a village in present day Shevgaon taluka in Ahmednagar district. Purandare wada (palace) in Saswad was the seat of the Purandares until 1818, when the Peshwas lost control to the British East India Company after the Third Anglo-Maratha War.The Purandare Wada still stands but is in a much dilapidated state. The design of the Purandare wada was the inspiration for the better known Shaniwar Wada in Pune.

== History ==
Peshwa Balaji Vishwanath rose to prominence through the support of Purandare. After becoming Peshwa, Balaji made Ambaji Pant Purandare as his Mutalik, or 'deputy Peshwa.' Ambaji Pant Purandare is the founder of the Purandare family. In 1727, a dispute concerned the posts of Kulkarni and Deshkulkarni between the Purandares and Atreyas in which the Purandares won.

== Notables ==
- Balwant Moreshwar Purandare, writer and theatrical personality from Maharashtra, India
