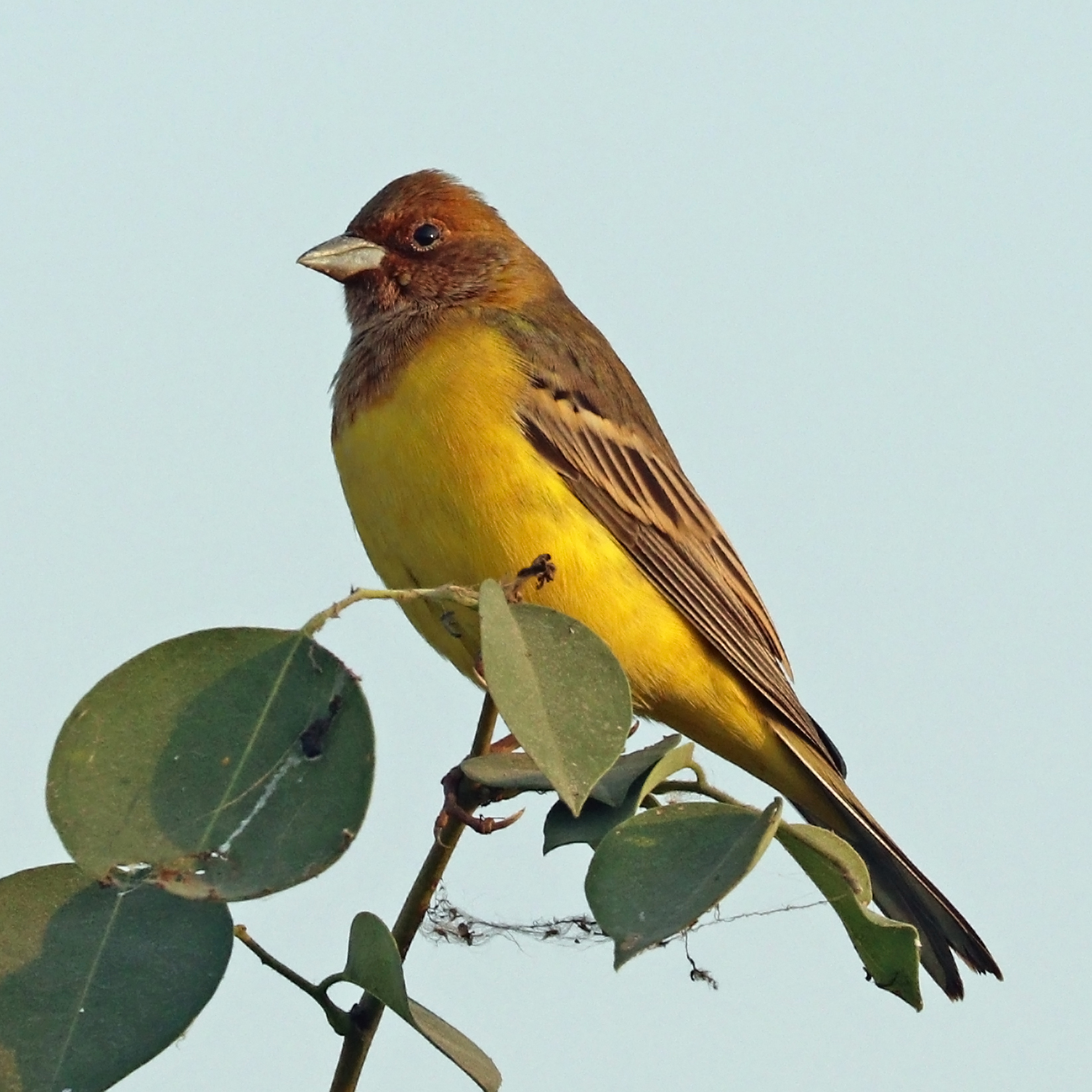
- Male in Uttar Pradesh, India
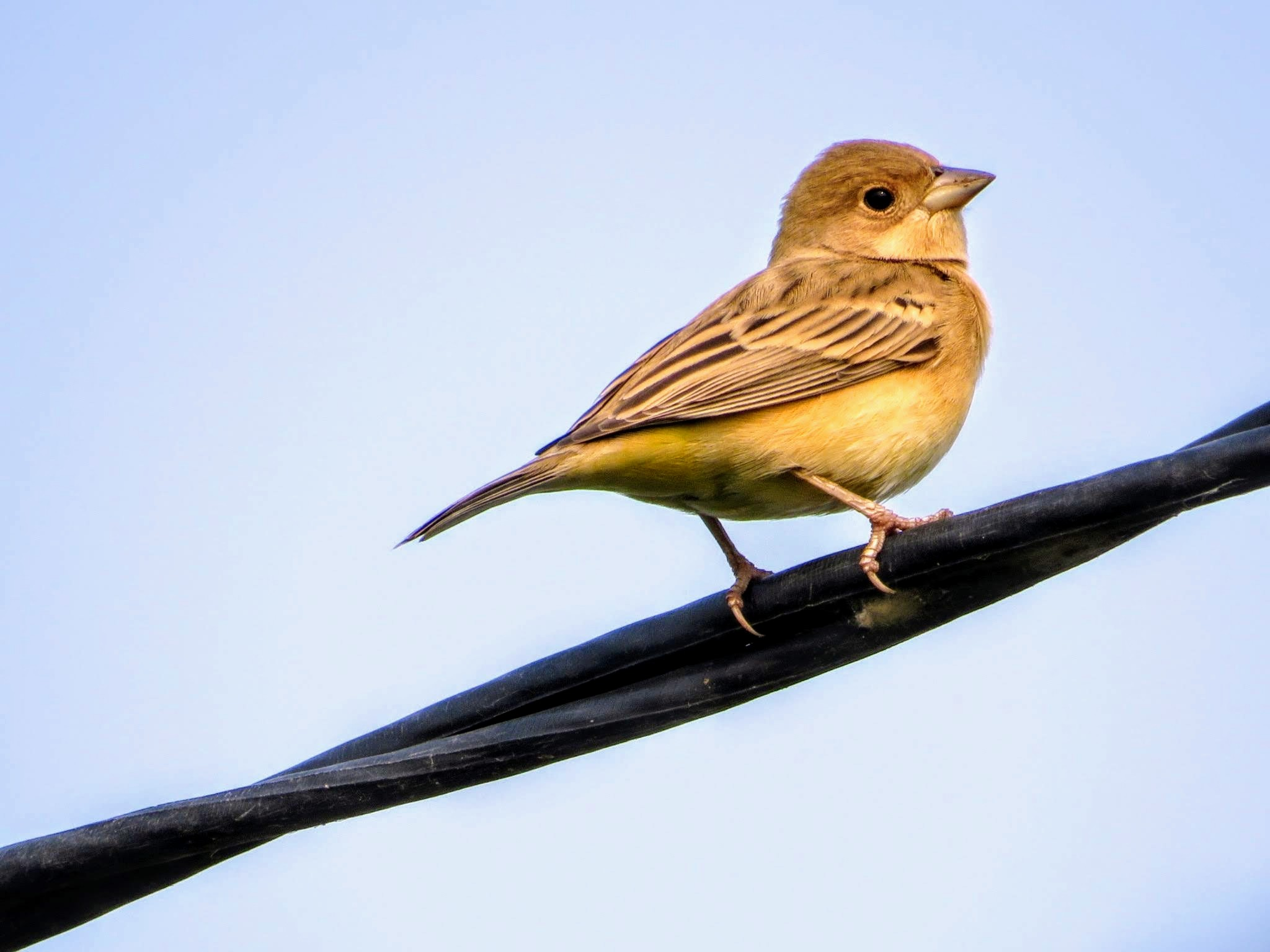
- Female in Vadodara, India

Conservation status
- Least Concern (IUCN 3.1)

Scientific classification
- Kingdom: Animalia
- Phylum: Chordata
- Class: Aves
- Order: Passeriformes
- Family: Emberizidae
- Genus: Melophus
- Species: M. bruniceps

Binomial name
- Melophus bruniceps (Brandt, 1841)

= Red-headed bunting =

Species of bunting

The red-headed bunting (Melophus bruniceps) is a small passerine bird in the Old World bunting family Emberizidae. It breeds in central Asia, including Afghanistan, Iran, Kazakhstan, Kyrgyzstan, Mongolia; Russia (European Russia, Central Asian Russia), Tajikistan, Turkmenistan, Uzbekistan and China. It is migratory, wintering in India and Bangladesh.

This species was formerly placed in the genus Emberiza but in 2026 it was moved to the resurrected genus Melophus based on the results of a 2021 molecular genetic study.

Its status in western Europe, where it is a vagrant, has been confused by escapes, especially as this species has been more commonly recorded than the closely related black-headed bunting, despite the latter having a more westerly breeding range. Reports in Britain have declined dramatically over recent years, coinciding with the decline in some Emberizidae species from the impact of illegal trade. An individual found on Shetland in 2010 was deemed to be wild in origin.

The red-headed bunting breeds in open scrubby areas including agricultural land. It lays three to five eggs in a nest in a tree or bush. Its natural food consists of seeds, or when feeding young, insects.

This bird is 17 cm long, larger than the common reed bunting, with a long tail. The breeding male has bright yellow underparts, green upperparts and a brownish-red face and breast.

The female is a washed-out version of the male, with paler underparts, a grey-brown back and a greyish head. The juvenile is similar, and both can be difficult to separate from the corresponding plumages of black-headed bunting bird.

The song, given from a high perch, is a jerky sweet-sweet-churri-churri-churri.

== Gallery ==
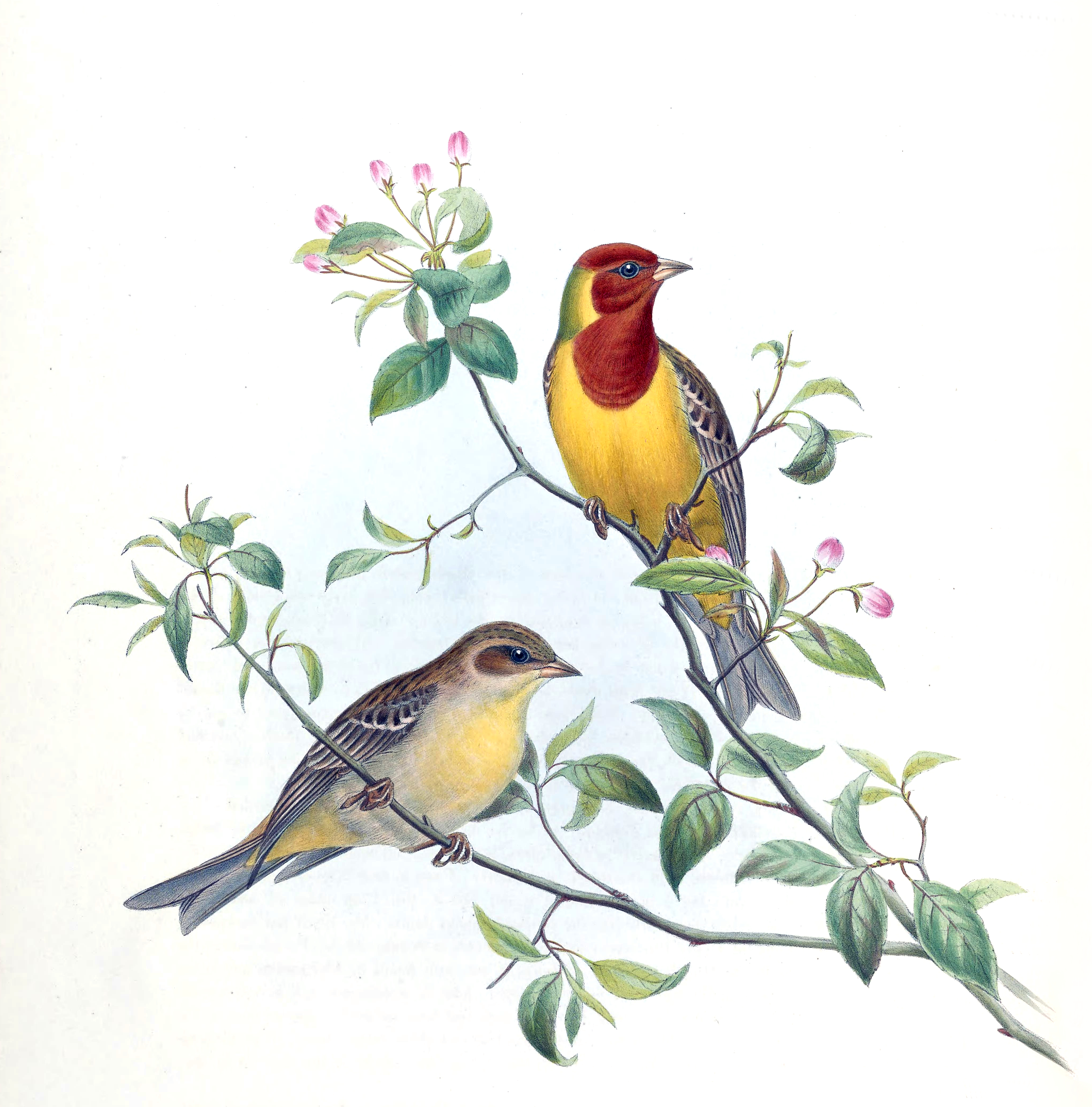
Painting

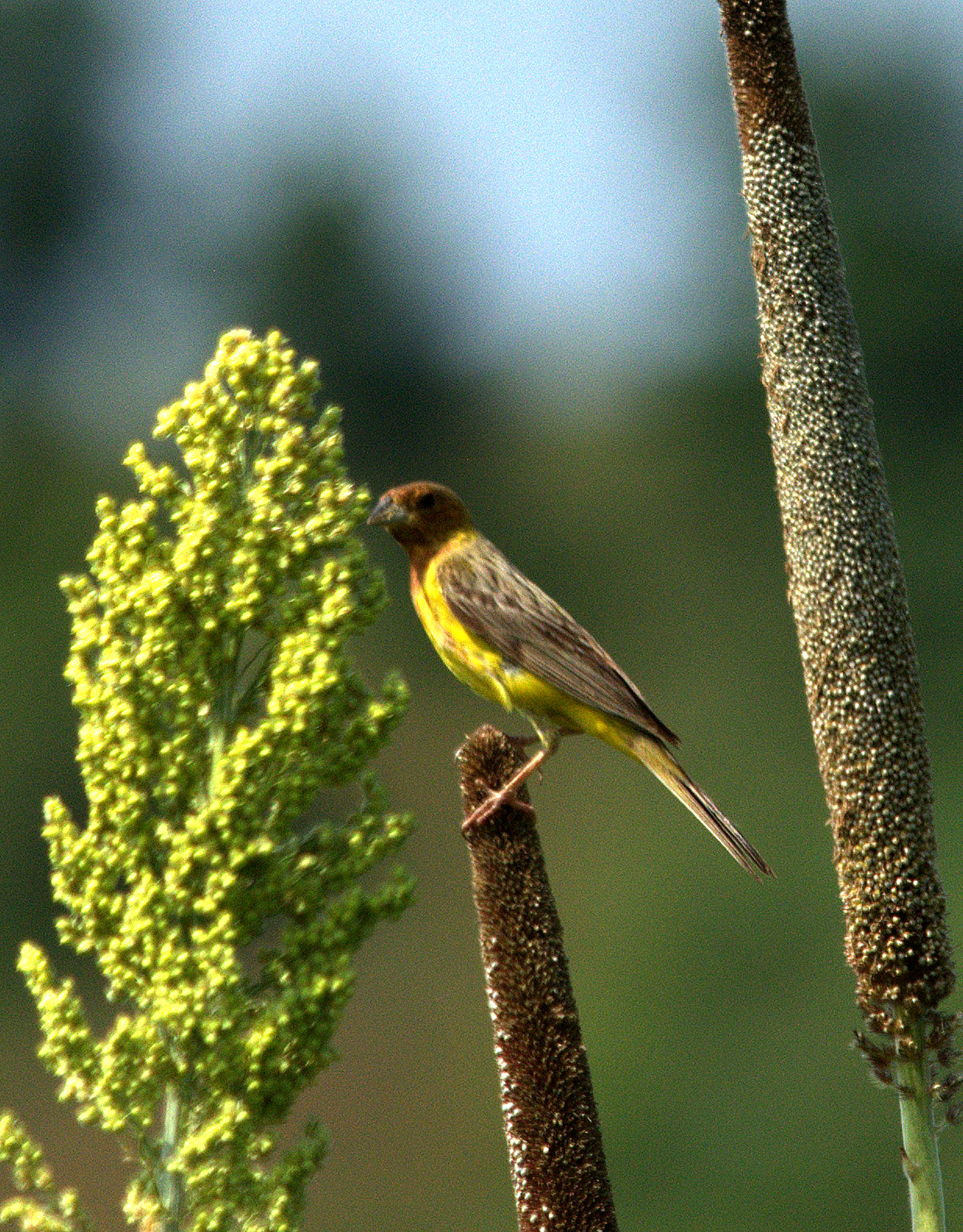
Yavatmal, Maharashtra, India.

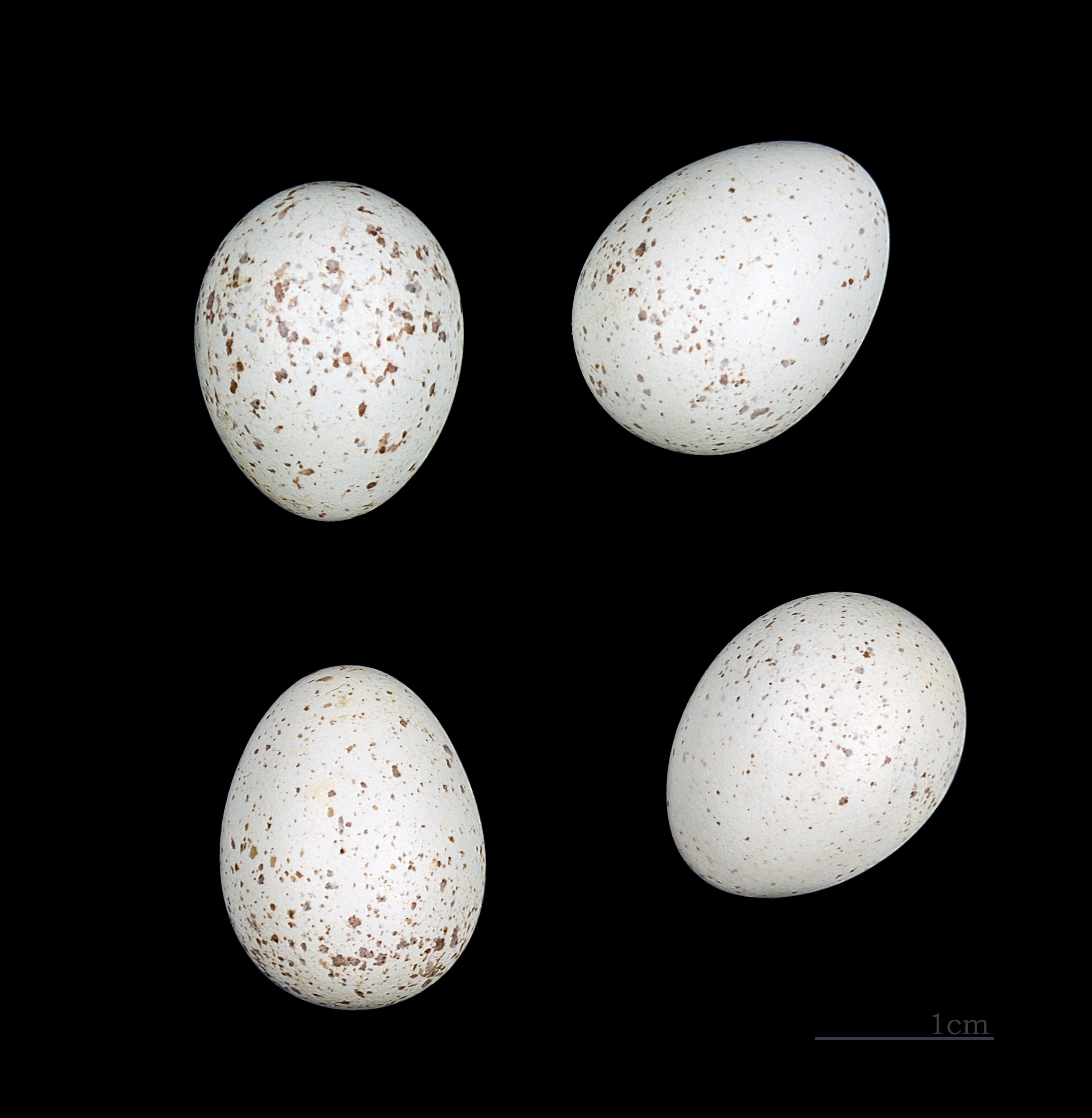
Eggs MHNT

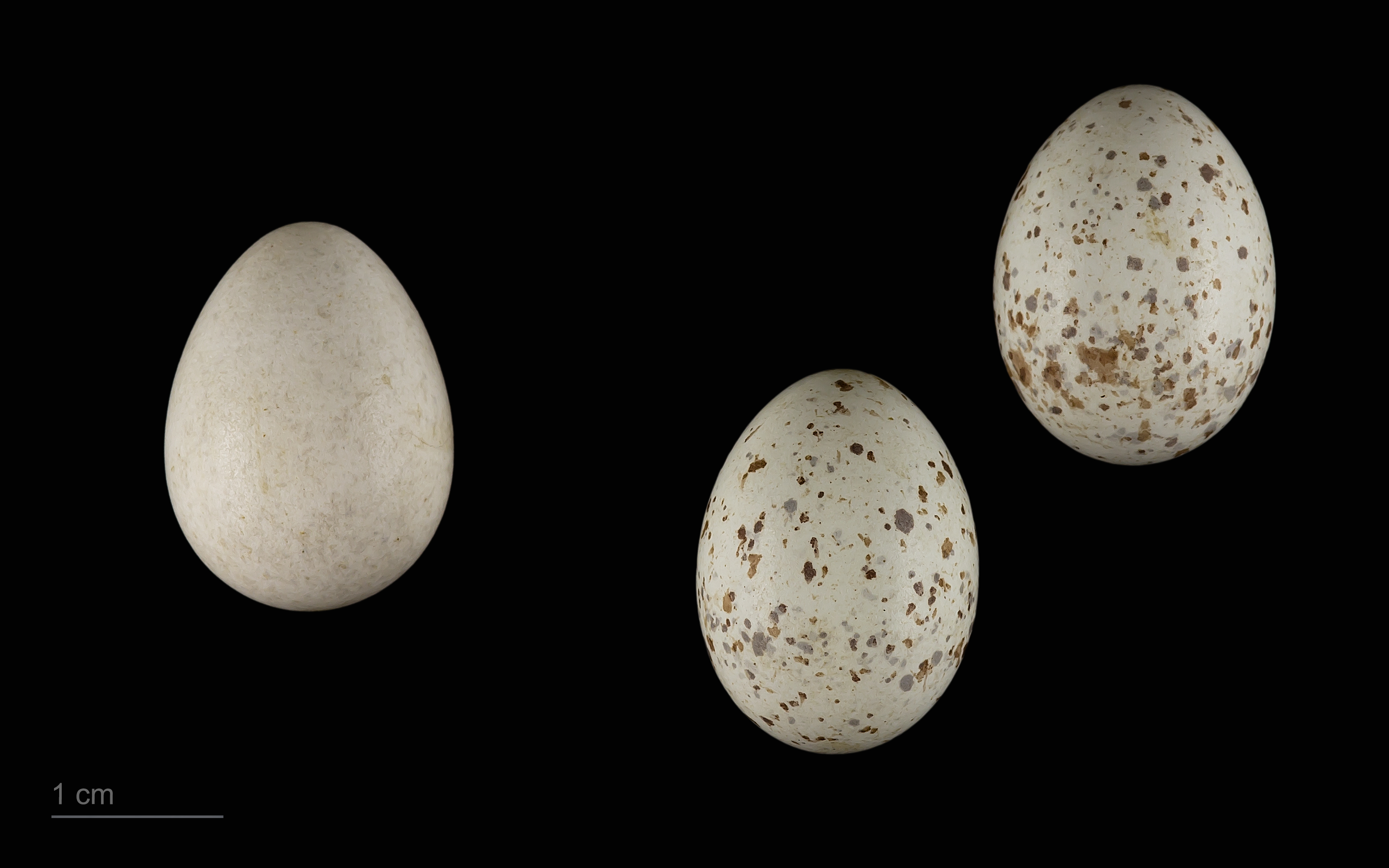
Cuculus canorus canorus in a clutch of Melophus bruniceps MHNT
