= Nirmala Purandare =

Indian social activist (1933–2019)

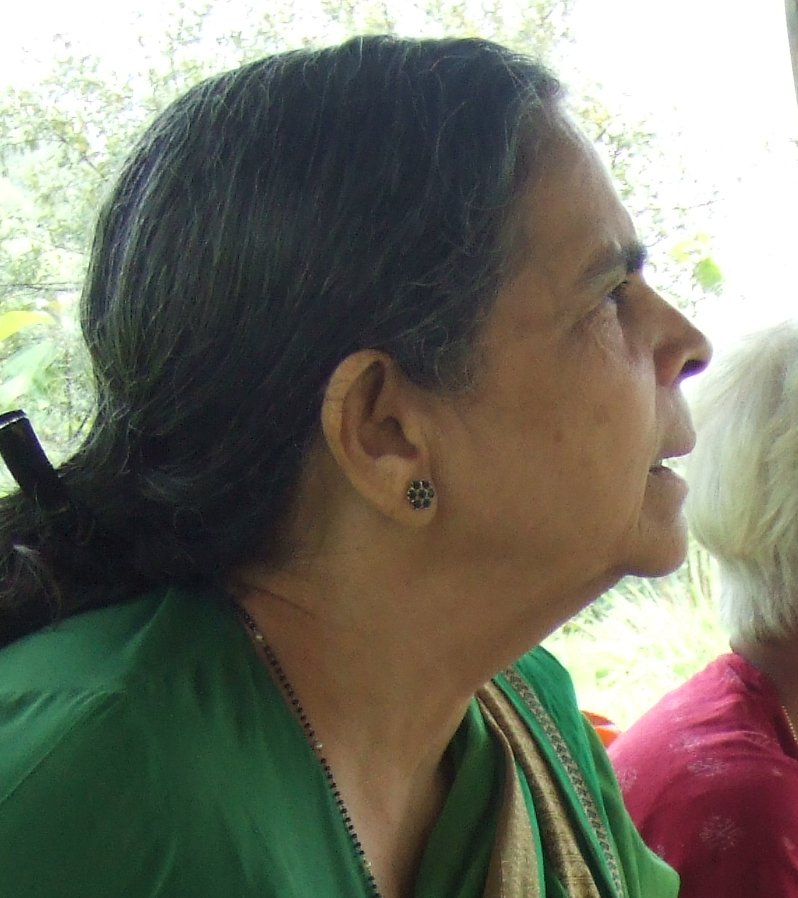
- Born: Nirmala Mazgaonkar; 5 January 1933; Baroda state, British India
- Died: 20 July 2019 (aged 86); Pune, Maharashtra, India
- Occupations: Social activist, author
- Works: Snehayatra
- Spouse: Babasaheb Purandare
- Children: 3
- Awards: Punyabhushan (2012)

Nirmala Balwant Purandare (née Mazgaonkar; 5 January 1933 – 20 July 2019) was an Indian social activist whose work focused on the education of children and advancement of women from rural Pune, in Maharashtra state. She authored the book Snehayatra. She was the wife of the playwright Babasaheb Purandare. She was the recipient of the Punyabhushan in 2012.
