= Narayanpur, Pune =

Shri Kshetra Narayanpur, Pune
- Village
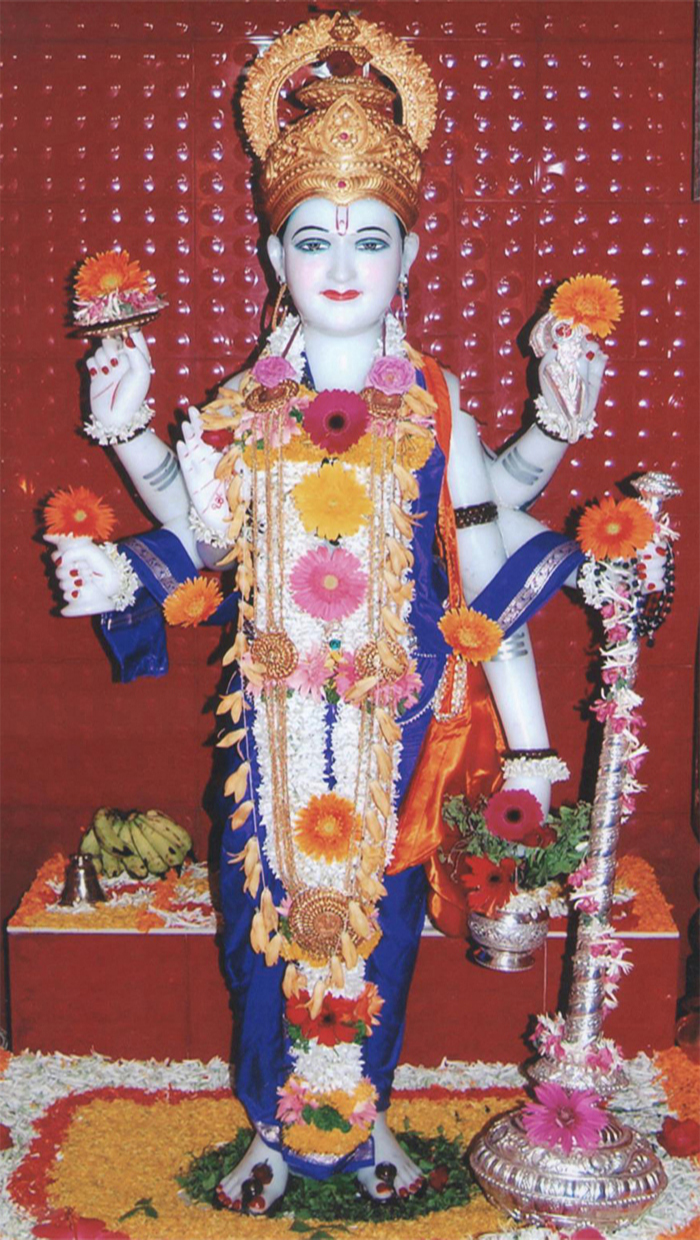
- Ek Mukhi Datta of Shri Kshetra Narayanpur
- Interactive map of Shri Kshetra Narayanpur, Pune
- Country: India
- Region: Pune
- Subdistrict: Purandar
- Mantra: Jay Jay Gurudev Datta Atri Anusaye Suta जय जय गुरुदेव दत्त, अत्री अनुसूये सुता Digambara Digambara ShreePada Vallabha Digambara

Narayanpur is a small village located in Purandhar valley in Pune district, Maharashtra, India. It is located about 35 km south of Pune city. One can reach Narayanpur from Pune either from Dive ghat and Saswad or from Katraj Ghat and Mumbai-Pune-Satara Road. Narayanpur is situated at the bottom of famous Purandar fort. Lord Indra's second name is Purandar. Indra made austerity on a nearby mountain, hence the name Purandhar valley. This place is also came to be known as Narayanpur by the ancient Narayaneshwar temple. Narayanpur is a paradise for nature lovers.

Narayanpur is a sacred place temples of "Lord Datta" and "Narayaneshwar". The famous Prati Balaji mandir at Ketkawale is located 10 km away, southerly to Narayanpur.

Shreenath Mhaskoba Temple the biggest temple of Purandar taluka is situated on Katraj- Kodit -Narayanpur road 3 km before Narayanpur.Good place to visit on Sunday and Amavasya.

The temple of Narayaneshwar here is very old. The sculptures are said to be of 'Yadav' era.

Narayanpur Datta Mandir has Ek Mukhi Datta idol and the sacred padukas. Sadguru Narayan Maharaj has built "Char DattaDhams" in four different directions in India, of which Narayanpur is one.

- First of the Char Dattadhams has been constructed in Madhya Pradesh "Shiva Datta Dham, Jalkoti, Maheshwar, Khargone Shiv Datta Dham, Jalkoti, Maheshwar, Madhya Pradesh"
- Second of the Char Dattadhams is in Kanyakumari Anusaya Datta Dham, Vattakottai, Kanyakumari"Anusaya Datta Dham, Vatta-kottai Vattakottai Fort, Anju Gramam, Kanyakumari".
- Third of the Char Dattadhams is near Kolkata "Bramha Datta Dham" and it is under construction situated in Bramha Datta Dham, Baruipara, Kolkata"Baruipara". This will be the largest Hindu temple in West Bengal.
- Shri Atri Dattadham, Himachal Pradesh

Narayanpur is also the village of Changdev Maharaj.
