= Pratap Govindrao Pawar =

Indian industrialist

Pratap Pawar
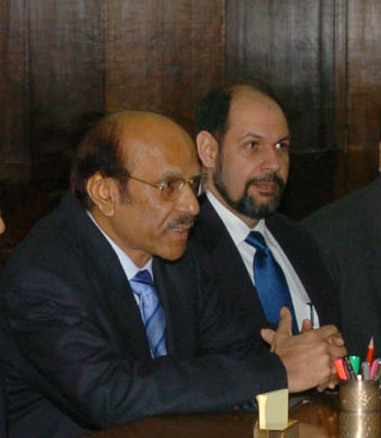
- Pratap Govindrao Pawar (left) in 2007.
- Born: Pratap Govindrao Pawar; Maharashtra, India
- Occupation: Industrialist
- Known for: Chairman & Managing Director of Sakal; Chairman of College of Engineering, Pune
- Parent(s): Govindrao Pawar (father); Sharadabai Pawar (mother)
- Relatives: Sharad Pawar (elder brother); Ajit Pawar (nephew); Supriya Sule (niece)
- Awards: Padma Shri (2014); Punya Bhushan (2015)

Pratap Govindrao Pawar is an Indian industrialist, and the chairman and managing director at Sakal Papers Pvt. Ltd. The Government of India awarded him the Padma Shri in 2014 for his contributions to trade and industry. He is also the chairman of College of Engineering Pune located in Shivajinagar, Pune.

== Career ==
Pawar is a former president of the Maharashtra Chamber of Commerce, Industries and Agriculture (MCCIA), Pune, the Indian Newspaper Society and the Indian Language Newspapers Association. He is a member of the executive committee of the World Association of Newspapers and News Publishers, Paris, and a UGC-nominee at the Press Council of India. He also serves on the director boards of several companies and is a recipient of the Punyabhushan Award. In 2014, the Government of India awarded him the Padma Shri, the fourth-highest civilian honor, for his contributions to trade and industry.

== Personal life ==
Pawar is the younger brother of Nationalist Congress Party (NCP) leader Sharad Pawar.

== Awards ==
- 2014 - Padma Shri
- 2015 - Punyabhushan
