= Saswad =

- city
- Location in Maharashtra, India
- Coordinates: 18.55°N 74.00°E
- Country: India
- State: Maharashtra
- District: PUNE
- Elevation: 767 m (2,516 ft)

Population (2019)
  - Total: 78,521

Languages
  - Official: Marathi
- Time zone: UTC+5:30 (IST)
- Vehicle registration: MH-12

Saswad is a municipal council located on the South-Eastern corridor of Pune district of the Indian state of Maharashtra. Saswad is situated on the banks of the Karha River. Saswad is about 31 km from Pune-Central Station.

== History ==
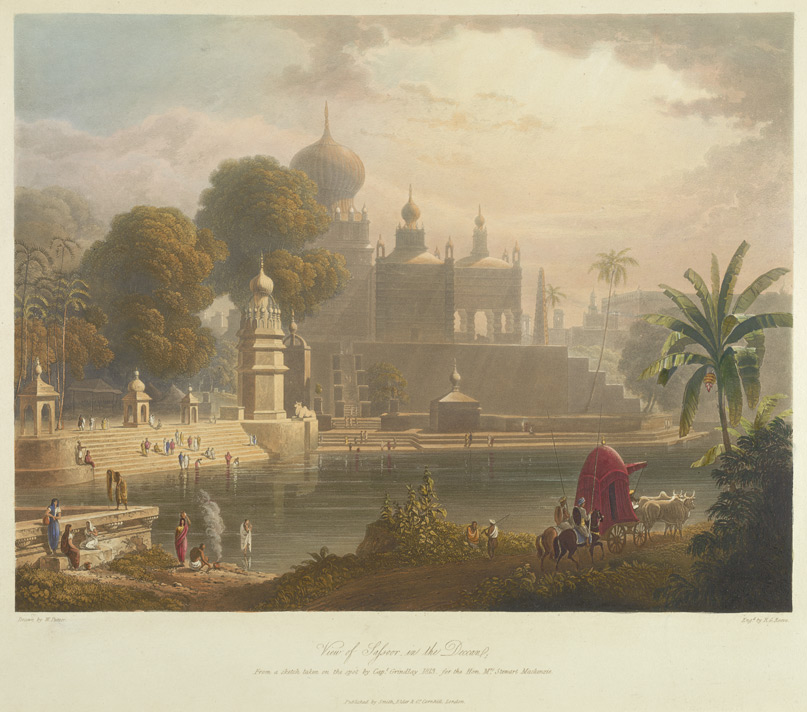
Sangameshwar temple in 1813 by British artist Robert Melville Grindlay. The Purandare palace can be seen in the background

Saswad is a place with a long history. It is situated on the ancient trade route connecting the coastal Konkan ports to the Deccan interiors. Being on a trade route made it a center for Buddhist monasteries. The samadhi or the resting place of the 13th century Varkari Sant Sopan is located in the town. The annual Alandi to Pandharpur Wari of Dnyaneshwar Palkhi stops in the town. Later it was known as the town at the foot of the historic Purandar fort. The first Peshwa from the Bhat family, Balaji Vishwanath had his base in the town. His son, Bajirao I moved his base in 1720 to Pune and turned that place into a large city. Bajirao's family built the Sangameshwar temple in the 1720s. During the 18th century, Saswad was the seat of the Purandare family, hereditary knights of the Peshwa. The family's now crumbling palatial mansion was an imposing sight during the late Peshwa era.

In the 20th century, socialist leader Marathi writer and filmmaker Aacharya Atre born in Kodit Khurd near Saswad. He was one of the leaders of the Samyukta Maharashtra Movement. His series of books on the movement. viz. Karheche Pani कऱ्हेचे पाणी created an undisputed place in the history of Marathi language.

Maharashtra Bhushan, Padmavibhushan Shivshahir Babasaheb Purandare was also from Saswad.

Saswas is land of Brave and Intellectual People. Saswad gets legacy from Chatrapati Shivaji Maharaj, Founder of Maratha Empire.

Birth Place of Chatrapati Sambhaji Maharaj which is Purandar Fort located nearby Saswad.

Some prominent Pandav era's Temples are located in Saswad. Some of them are Vateshwar Temple, Sangameshwar Temple and Siddheshwar Temple.

Karhabai Temple is also located on karha River.

First Peshwa Balaji Vishwanath has Samadhi located nearby Karhabai Temple.

Mastani wada was constructed for Mastani who was wife of Bajirao I is located in saswad. Mastani lake is also nearby.

First Battle for Hindavi Swarajy was fought nearby Saswad. First Sarsenapati of Hindavi Swarajy was Veer Baji Pasalkar. Who's Samadhi is also located in Saswad.

Famous personalities from saswad in recent times are Pralhad Keshav Atre alias Achary Atre, Babasaheb Purandare Vijay Shivtare, Sanjay Jagtap, and famous actor Nilesh Sable.

Diwali Pahat event gets arranged in Achary Atre Sanskrutik Bhavan, Saswad during Diwali festival.

87th Akhil Bhartiy Marathi Sahitya Sammelan was conducted in Saswad in 2014.

Many movies shooting was conducted at Sardar Purandare Wada and vateshwar Temple. Eg.Tumbad, fatteshikast etc.

== Demographics ==
As of 2019, Saswad had a population of 78,521. Males constitute 52% of the population and females 48%. Saswad has an average literacy rate of 85%, higher than the national average of 59.5%: male literacy was 90%, and female literacy was 80%. In Saswad, 12% of the population was under 6.

== Geography ==
Given its proximity to Pune, Saswad may become part of Pune metropolitan area. The town is just 25 km away from Pune city and 20 minutes from Hadapsar. The Eotte (Royal Purandar) city that is under construction is 10 km from Saswad. Magarpatta City and Amannora Tower City are 25 km from Saswad. Saswad offers many apartments and shopping complexes. Saswad is the base for visitors to nearby Khandoba temple at Jejuri, the ek-mukhi Datta temple at Narayanpur and the historic Purandar fort. It is mentioned as the residence of Peshwa Bajirao in the TV soap Peshwa Bajirao.

Saswad city recently received Cleanest city in India award from Urband Development Ministry of India.

== Transport ==
Pune city buses (PMPML) run services to Saswad from Hadapsar, Swargate and Pune Train Station. The town has its own ST depot to long-distance destinations.

Saswad is close to Jejuri railway station with services to Pune and to destinations south such as Miraj.

Pune airport is 50-60 min(via Kharadi bypass) away.

New Pune International Airport (Sambhaji Maharaj International Airport, Purandar) is getting constructed nearby Saswad area.

== Education ==
Saswad has educational institutions that cater for the needs of different ages and sections of the society. Eight schools are run by the municipal council, many privately run primary and secondary schools that offering instruction in Marathi and English, and Christian mission run schools offering instruction in English. The town hosts colleges offering degree level courses. An ITI offers vocational training.

=== Schools ===
- Kanya prashala
- M.E.S Waghire high school (म.ए.सो.वाघीरे विद्यालय)
- Purandar high school
- Shivaji English Medium
- Gurukul primary school
- Bachpan primary school
- St. Joseph English medium

=== Colleges ===
- Purandar engineering college
- Shivaji D'ed college
- Waghire College of Arts, Commerce and Science
- Purandar college
- Sheth Govind Raghunath Sabale college of Pharmacy- Saswad

=== Tourist Places ===
- Sangameshwar temple
- Purandare wada
- Acharya Atre Garden
- Old Bhairoba Temple (Temple of Village God)
- Veer Baji Pasalkar Samadhi
- Sopandev Samadhi
- Sardar Godaji Raje Jagtap Samadhi *Dr Babasaheb Ambedkar Garden*

== Industry ==
Due to improvement in transport, many Maharashtra Industrial Development Corporation industrial parks around Pune - (Pimpri-Chinchwad) MIDC, Chakan MIDC, Ranjangaon MIDC and Jejuri MIDC are close enough for commuting from Saswad.

Kirloskar pneumatics industry is located in Saswad.

== In Art and Literature ==
An engraving of the painting by William Purser (taken from drawings by Grindlay) is the subject of a poetical illustration by Letitia Elizabeth Landon in Fisher's Drawing Room Scrap Book, 1835. Landon records the temple as being dedicated to Mahadeo.
