= Sakal =

Indian daily newspaper

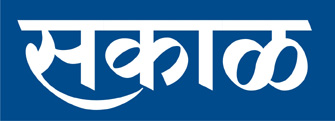

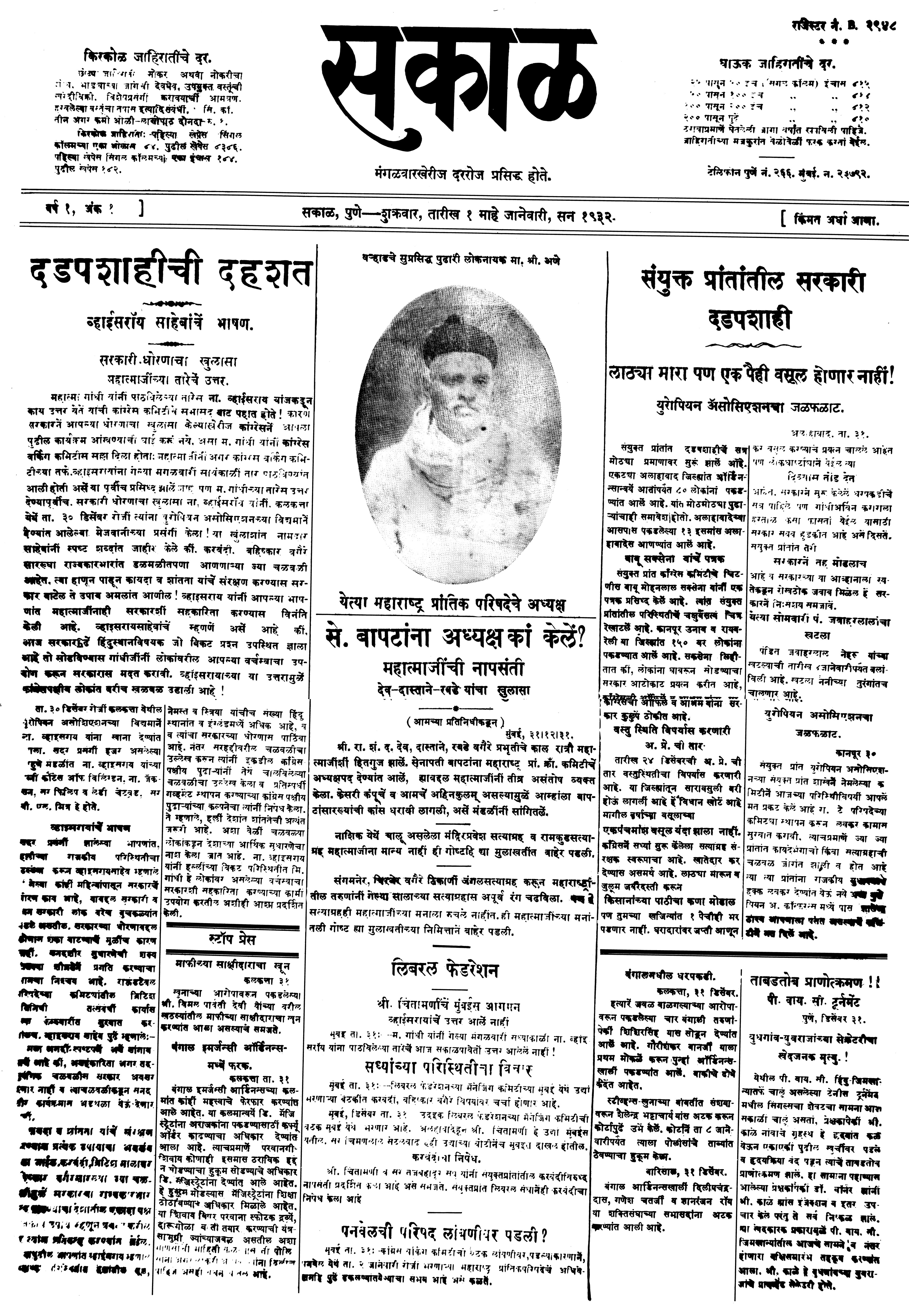
- "Rise of the future newspaper" (उदय भविष्यपत्राचा)
- Type: Daily newspaper
- Format: Broadsheet
- Owner: Sakal Media Group
- Editor-in-chief: Rahul Gadpale
- Founded: 1 January 1932
- Language: Marathi
- Headquarters: 595, Budhwar Peth, Pune, Maharashtra, India
- Circulation: 1,064,721 daily (as of 2022)
- Sister newspapers: Sakal Times; Agrowon
- Website: https://www.esakal.com/

Sakal (lit. “Morning”) is a Marathi language daily newspaper published by the Sakal Media Group. Founded by Nanasaheb Parulekar in 1932, Sakal currently has a daily circulation of approximately 1.1 million copies, distributed across major cities including Pune and Mumbai.

== History ==
Sakal originated during the pre-independence nationalist period. Its founder, Nanasaheb Parulekar, was influenced by American newspapers during his time at Columbia University. Although it was started as part of the nationalist cause, the Sakal newspaper transitioned, after Indian independence, into a commercially viable publication by focusing on local and rural issues around Pune.

By the 1960s, Sakal had appointed full-time correspondents, each equipped with a phone, in every town in its coverage area. It organized training camps for journalists, promotions, and cultural events for readers, and published letters to the editor on its front page.

Under Nanasaheb Parulekar, the paper was described as maintaining political neutrality and endorsing candidates for local, state, or national elections when deemed suitable.

When Nanasaheb Parulekar died in 1973, the paper continued operating with practices established during his tenure. It survived the initial changes brought by advancements in newspaper technology and continued for over 10 years. Pratap Pawar joined the board of Sakal in 1985. Pawar converted the paper into a public limited company in 1989, becoming its managing director. As of 2025, Pawar is chairman of the group.

=== List of editors ===
- N. B. Parulekar – 1 January 1932 to 31 December 1943
- Ramchandra Balawant (also known as Babasaheb Ghorpade) – 1 January 1944 to 20 February 1951
- N. B. Parulekar – 21 February 1951 to 8 January 1973
- Shridhar (S. G. Mungekar)– 9 January 1973 to 9 February 1985
- V. D. Ranade – 10 February 1985 to 30 April 1987
- S. K. Kulkarni – 1 May 1987 to 31 July 1987
- Vijay Kuwalekar – 1 August 1987 to 7 August 2000
- Anant Dixit – 8 August 2000 to 15 July 2005
- Yamaji Malkar – 16 July 2005 to 9 May 2009
- Uttam Kamble – 10 May 2009 to 31 July 2012 (Editor in Chief)
- Shriram Pawar – 1 August 2012 to 28 February 2018 (Editor in Chief)
- Nand Kumar Sutar - 1 May 2013 to 16 June 2019 (Executive Editor)
- Rahul Gadpale – 1 March 2018 – to date (Editor in Chief)

== Operations ==
Abhijit Pawar is currently the managing director of the group. In 2021, the group launched Agrowon, described as the first and only agriculture daily. The official website states that it is the "first media company to organize events & exhibitions as well as the first media group to implement 6-sigma processes across the company." The company recently launched 515 agriculture marts in Maharashtra under the name of Agrowon Agrotech.

== Events ==
The group organizes events and activities that target a variety of sectors such as education, agriculture, travel-tourism, and business. Its international event, 'EDUCON', serves as a forum for Vice-Chancellors from across India to present their vision for Indian higher education. Other events include Property Mahayatra, Education Mahayatra, MPL, Pune Shopping Festivals, Family Health, Sakal Edugain, Sakal Investneet, Sakal Vastu, and Sakal Shagun. The Group has established clubs for specific audiences, such as Madhurangan (मधुरांगण) for women, Young Buzz and Sakal NIE (Newspaper in Education), and Family Doctor Club.

=== Pune Bus Day ===
Pune Bus Day was an event organized by Sakal Media Group. The initiative, led by company managing director Abhijit Pawar, aimed to address traffic congestion in Pune. For Pune Bus Day, Sakal Media Group aimed to arrange 1,500 buses to supplement the existing fleet of 1,650 PMPML buses, demonstrating how using a sufficient number of buses with high frequency could potentially reduce traffic congestion. The tagline for the initiative was "Come, let's travel by PMPML bus on 1 November 2012".
At the time, the perceived lack of sufficient buses prompted commuters to opt for private vehicles, contributing to issues like traffic congestion, vehicular pollution, and accidents. According to a study conducted by city-based NGO Parisar in 2009–10, the bus service run by the Pune Mahanagar Parivahan Mahamandal Limited (PMPML) was found to be comparatively expensive, with lower service quality and a higher breakdown rate when compared to transport utilities in Mumbai, Chennai, Bengaluru, and Delhi.

A web portal developed by a Pune-based IT company provided information about bus routes and other details, utilizing real-time information on bus schedules from the PMPML.

=== Pune Half Marathon ===
The Pune Half Marathon is another event organized by the Sakal Media Group. The event was launched in 2018 with a focus on promoting wellness and fitness among Pune residents. The second event was held on 22 December 2019, and saw participation from over 20,000 runners. US Olympian Janet Cherobon-Bawcom was the event ambassador for the 2019 race, which focused on supporting the Indian running community.

The first event in 2018 collaborated with Jack Daniels, a former Olympic medalist described as a prominent running coach. The event collaborated with Daniels' project, "The RUN Smart Project", which devised free training plans for participants. Daniels provided training talks and mentored aspects of the event execution. In addition, American runner Ryan Hall was the event ambassador for Pune Half Marathon 2018.

Bajaj Allianz were the title sponsors for the first two editions of the race.

== Publications ==
The Group's publications include the English-language daily (which replaced The Maharashtra Herald), Gomantak, and Gomantak Times, Marathi and English language dailies published from Goa, respectively. Agrowon is a daily dedicated to agriculture. The group also publishes several supplements, such as Pratibimb, Young Buzz, positive (Financial supplement), and Job Buzz.

Sakal also has a book publishing division that covers various subjects, including health, entertainment, sports, spiritual, and children's literature. Published titles include Ayurvediya Garbhsanskar by Shri. Balaji Tambe and Timeless Inspirator edited by Dr. Raghunath Mashelkar, as well as a comic strip book of Chintoo.

Tanishka Logo

=== Magazines ===
Sakal Group publishes several magazines, such as Sakal Saptahik (सकाळ साप्ताहिक). According to a 2010 Indian Readership Survey, Saptahik Sakal was the most popular magazine in Maharashtra. Tanishka (तनिष्का) is a monthly magazine for women, and Premier (प्रीमियर) is a monthly magazine covering the entertainment industry.

== Sakal Social Foundation ==
Sakal Social Foundation is a social initiative wing of the Group that works primarily in Maharashtra, focusing on areas such as health, poverty, education, environment, and governance.

== Controversies ==
In 2005, the Supreme Court of India ruled against Sakal in a case involving the unauthorized transfer of shares belonging to the late Claude-Lila Parulekar, daughter of the founder. In conclusion, the court ordered the company to pay ₹3 crore in compensation.
