= Kodit Khurd =

Kodit Khurd is a small village of Purandar taluka in Pune District of Maharashtra State, India, situated on Bank of Karha River.

== Notable people ==
- Pralhad Keshav Atre
