= Babasaheb Purandare =

Indian writer (1922–2021)

Shiv Shahir Babasaheb Purandare
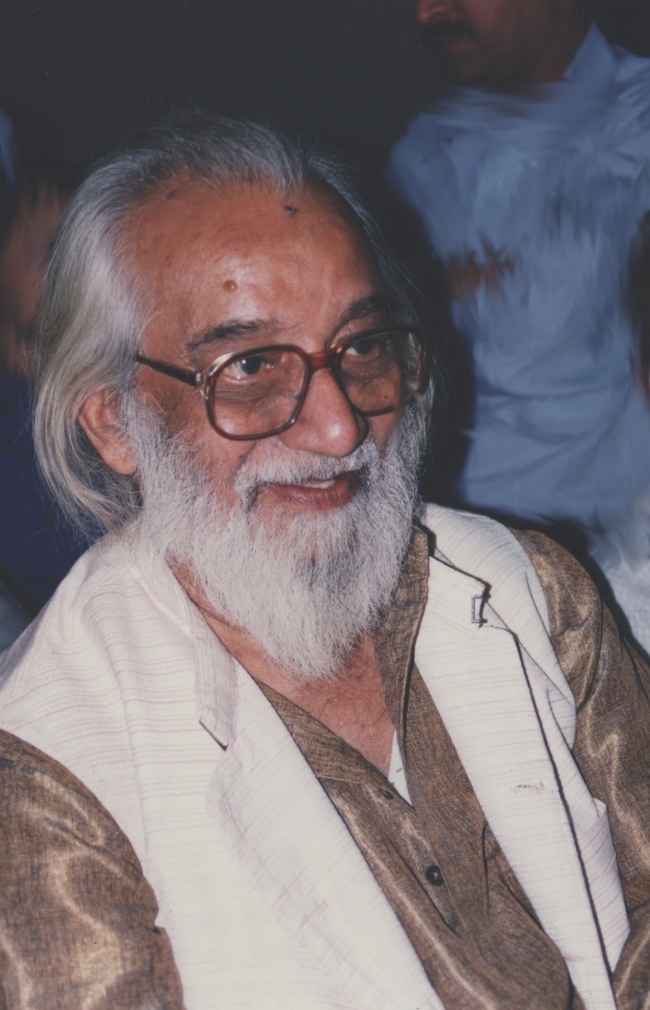
- Born: Balwant Moreshwar Purandare; 29 July 1922; Shukrawar Peth, Pune
- Died: 15 November 2021 (aged 99); Pune, Maharashtra, India
- Occupations: Historian, writer, orator
- Spouse: Nirmala Purandare (died 2019)
- Children: 3
- Awards: Padma Vibhushan (2019); Maharashtra Bhushan (2015); Kalidas Samman (2007–08)

Balwant Moreshwar Purandare (29 July 1922 – 15 November 2021), popularly known as Babasaheb Purandare, was an Indian historian and writer of books and plays from Maharashtra, India. His works are mostly based on the life of Shivaji, the 17th-century founder of the Maratha Empire; as a result he is called Shiv-Shahir ("Shivaji's bard"). He is mostly known for his popular play on Shivaji, Jaanta Raja. Purandare also studied the history of the Peshwas of Pune. In 2015, he was awarded the Maharashtra Bhushan Award, Maharashtra's highest civilian award. He was awarded the Padma Vibhushan, India's second-highest civilian award on 25 January 2019.

== Early life ==
Babasaheb was born in Pune in 1922 and belonged to the noble family of the Purandare, who were senior Sardars in the court of the Peshwa. In 1930, when he was seven, the Purandare family had to move out from Pune as a wave of plague had returned to the city. They temporarily shifted to a relative’s home in Donje on the city outskirts, at the foothills of Sinhagad Fort. During this stay, the family would visit the fort and Babasaheb's father would tell him stories of the fort and Shivaji's rendezvous at the hilly citadel which was once called Kondhana. His young mind was so taken by the history and stories of the Maratha Empire and the ramparts of the forts, that for the next nine decades it would be the sole preoccupation of his life.

In the early days of his career he worked in Acharya Atre's newspaper as a journalist. He made several contributions in the formative years of the Shiv Sena as a senior party leader. He also participated in the Liberation of Dadra and Nagar Haveli from Portuguese rule.

== Works ==
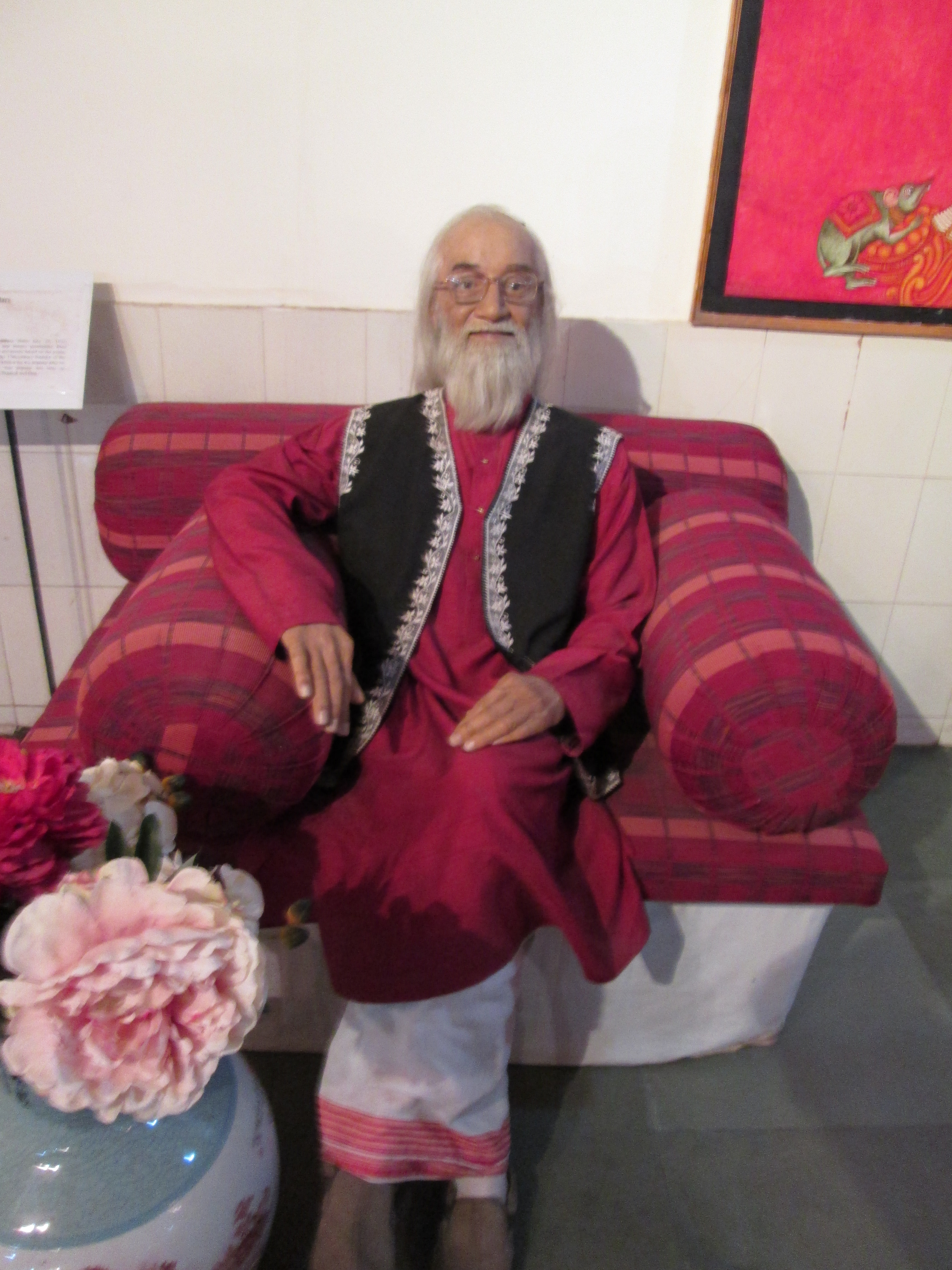
Babasaheb Purandare Wax Statue at Wax Museum, Lonavala.

Purandare had started writing stories related to the period of Shivaji's reign at a very young age, which were later compiled and published in a book titled Thinagya ("Sparks"). His other works include books titled Raja Shiva-Chatrapati and Kesari, and a book on life of Narayanrao Peshwa. His most well-known work is the drama, Jaanata Raja, a widely popular play on Shivaji published and first staged in 1985. Since then the drama has been staged over 1000 times in 16 districts of Maharashtra, Agra, Delhi, Bhopal, and the United States. Originally written in Marathi, this work was later translated into Hindi. This drama is performed by over 200 artists, and includes elephants, camels and horses. Generally the performance of this drama begins around Diwali each year.

For his works, in the field of drama, he was awarded the Kalidas Samman by the Madhya Pradesh government for 2007–08.

== Restoration and preservation efforts ==
Historically, his family held positions of power in the Maratha Empire, which gave him access to a lot of objects,ceremonial weaponry and documents. They were aptly ustilised by him and formed the basis of some of his literature. The items which were part of his family heritage were properly documented, analyzed and many donations to museums took place. He has also worked immensely in the field of historical archiving as well as proper restoration of historical documents and artifacts from the Maratha Period. The Vishrambaug Wada houses many such items painstakingly preserved by him. After his demise, there was an outcry regarding the fate of the artifacts, their preservation and proper caretaking at the Wada.

He also founded शिवसृष्टी (ShivShrushti) near Ambegaon in Pune, which preserves the Maratha culture and artistic prowess from the rule of Shivaji.

== Personal life ==
He belonged to the Deshastha Rigvedi Purandare Family. His wife, Nirmala Purandare, was a social activist who founded the Vanasthali organisation in Pune. She was known for working amongst rural women, and in the area of child development. Purandare has a daughter and two sons. All his children are active in the Marathi literary field.

Over his lifetime, he donated a lot of his income from literature to numerous charitable organizations and NGOs which fight for a good cause.In one such instance, he kept only 10 paise of the ₹10 Lakh cash award for receiving the Maharashtra Bhushan. He added ₹15 Lakhs from his own pocket, and donated the entire sum towards cancer research.

Purandare died from pneumonia on 15 November 2021, at the age of 99 in a hospital in Pune.

== Criticism ==
Purandare's critics have accused him of distorting history. One of their biggest criticisms has been that Purandare has portrayed Dadoji Kondadeo as Shivaji's guru.

== In popular culture ==
- A 2008 TV show, Raja Shivchhatrapati depicting the life of Maratha king Shivaji, was based on Raja Shivchhatrapati, written by Babasaheb Purandare.
