= Karha River =

Coordinates: 18°12′N 74°31′E

- Native name: कर्‍हा नदी (Marathi)

Location
- Country: India
- State: Maharashtra
- District: Pune

Physical characteristics
- Source: Saswad
  - location: Maharastra, India
- Mouth: Nira River
  - location: Maharashtra, India
- Discharge
  - location: mouth

The Karha is a river flowing through the Indian state of Maharashtra. Its basin lies in the parts of Pune. The cities of Baramati, Saswad and Jejuri, the place of Lord Khandoba, lie on the banks of this river. The Karha is a tributary of the Nira River. It is said that the Karha's water flows fastest amongst all tributaries of the River Nira. Also there is a dam called Nazare situated on Karha.

The area around Baramati taluka suffers from an acute water crisis each year as the Karha river goes dry.

== Geography ==
The Karha is considered one of the holy rivers. A temple of Lord Ganesha, one amongst the Ashtavinayaka, the Moreshwar of Moregaon is situated on the banks of the river. The river has a significant importance in Jejuri, considered holy for the devotees of Lord Khandoba. The origin of Karha River is near the Garade Village in Saswad Taluka and merges with the Nira River near Songaon in the Baramati Tehsil.

== History ==
On the banks of the Karha, a great Marathi socialist writer and filmmaker, P. K. Atre was born. He was one of the leaders in the Sanyukta Maharashtra movement. His series of books on the movement, Karheche Pani कऱ्हेचे पाणी is a famous piece of literature in Marathi.

== See also ==
- List of rivers of India
- Rivers of India
