= Ministry of Co-operation (Maharashtra) =

Maharashtra government ministry responsible for Co-operation

Ministry of Co-operation Government of Maharashtra
- मंत्रालय सहकार विभाग, महाराष्ट्र शासन
- Seal of the state of Maharashtra

- Building of Administrative Headquarters of Mumbai

Ministry overview
- Jurisdiction: (India) Maharashtra
- Headquarters: Mantralay, Mumbai
- Minister responsible: Babasaheb Mohanrao Patil, Cabinet Minister
- Deputy Minister responsible: Pankaj Bhoyar, Minister of State
- Ministry executive: (IAS)
- Parent department: Government of Maharashtra

The Ministry of Co-operation is a ministry of the Government of Maharashtra.

The ministry is headed by a cabinet-level minister. Babasaheb Mohanrao Patil is the current Minister of Co-operation.

== Head office ==
Minister of Co-operation मंत्री सहकार विभाग
- Emblem of India

- Flag of India
- Incumbent; Babasaheb Mohanrao Patil since 21 December 2024
- Ministry of Co-operation (Maharashtra)
- Style: The Honourable
- Abbreviation: Cabinet Minister
- Member of: State Cabinet
- Reports to: Chief Minister, Maharashtra Legislature
- Seat: Mantralaya, Mumbai
- Appointer: Governor on the advice of the Chief Minister
- Term length: 5 years
- Precursor: Dilip Walse-Patil; (2023- 2024)
- Inaugural holder: Sadashiv Govind Barve; (1960-1962)
- Formation: 1 May 1960
- Deputy: Pankaj Bhoyar

== Cabinet Ministers ==
No.	Portrait	Minister (Constituency)	Term of office			Political party	Ministry	Chief Minister
No.	Portrait	Minister (Constituency)	From	To	Period	Political party	Ministry	Chief Minister
Minister of Co-operation
01		Balasaheb Shivram Bharde (MLA for Ahmednagar South Constituency No. 224- Ahmednagar District) (Legislative Assembly)	01 May 1960	07 March 1962	1 year, 310 days	Indian National Congress	Yashwantrao I	Yashwantrao Chavan
02		Sadashiv Govind Barve (MLA for Shivajinagar Constituency No. 209- Pune District) (Legislative Assembly)	08 March 1962	19 November 1962	256 days	Indian National Congress	Yashwantrao II	Yashwantrao Chavan
03		Keshavrao Sonawane (MLA for Latur Constituency No. 235- Latur District) (Legislative Assembly)	20 November 1962	24 November 1963	1 year, 4 days	Indian National Congress	Kannamwar l	Marotrao Kannamwar
04		P. K. Sawant (MLA for Chiplun Constituency No. 265- Ratnagiri District) (Legislative Assembly) (Interim Chief Minister)	25 November 1962	04 December 1963	9 days	Indian National Congress	Sawant	P. K. Sawant
05		Keshavrao Sonawane (MLA for Latur Constituency No. 235- Latur District) (Legislative Assembly)	05 December 1963	01 March 1967	3 years, 86 days	Indian National Congress	Vasantrao I	Vasantrao Naik
06		Keshavrao Sonawane (MLA for Ausa Constituency No. 239- Latur District) (Legislative Assembly)	01 March 1967	27 October 1969	2 years, 240 days	Indian National Congress	Vasantrao II	Vasantrao Naik
07		Gopalrao Bajirao Khedkar (MLA for Akot Constituency No. 28- Akola District) (Legislative Assembly)	27 October 1969	13 March 1972	2 years, 138 days	Indian National Congress	Vasantrao II	Vasantrao Naik
08		Madhukar Dhanaji Chaudhari (MLA for Raver Constituency No. 11- Jalgaon District) (Legislative Assembly)	13 March 1972	04 April 1973	1 year, 32 days	Indian National Congress	Vasantrao III	Vasantrao Naik
09		Shankarrao Chavan (MLA for Bhokar Constituency No. 85- Nanded District) (Legislative Assembly)	04 April 1973	17 Match; 1974	347 days	Indian National Congress	Vasantrao III	Vasantrao Naik
10		Yashwantrao Mohite (MLA for Karad South Constituency No. 260- Satara District) (Legislative Assembly)	17 Match; 1974	21 February 1975	341 days	Indian National Congress	Vasantrao III	Vasantrao Naik
11		Yashwantrao Mohite (MLA for Karad South Constituency No. 260- Satara District) (Legislative Assembly)	21 February 1975	23 February 1976	1 year, 2 days	Indian National Congress	Shankarrao I	Shankarrao Chavan
12		Sharad Pawar (MLA for Baramati Constituency No. 201- Pune District) (Legislative Assembly)	23 February 1976	16 April 1977	1 year, 52 days	Indian National Congress	Shankarrao I	Shankarrao Chavan
13		Shivajirao Girdhar Patil (MLA for Shirpur Constituency No. 09- Dhule District) (Legislative Assembly)	17 April 1977	07 March 1978	1 year, 324 days	Indian National Congress	Vasantdada I	Vasantdada Patil
14		Prabha Rau (MLA for Pulgaon Constituency No. 41- Wardha District) (Legislative Assembly)	07 March 1978	18 July 1978	133 days	Indian National Congress (Indira)	Vasantdada II	Vasantdada Patil
15		Narayan Dnyandev Patil (MLA for Kolhapur Constituency No. 273- Kolhapur District (Legislative Assembly)	18 July 1978	17 February 1980	1 year, 214 days	Peasants and Workers Party of India	Pawar I	Sharad Pawar
16		Shalini Patil (MLA for Koregaon Constituency No. 257- Satara District) (Legislative Assembly)	09 June 1980	21 January 1982	1 year, 226 days	Indian National Congress	Antulay	Abdul Rahman Antulay
17		Babasaheb Bhosale (MLA for Nehrunagar Constituency No. 172- Mumbai Suburban District) (Legislative Assembly) (Chief Minister)	21 January 1982	02 February 1983	1 year, 12 days	Indian National Congress	Bhosale	Babasaheb Bhosale
18		Vasantdada Patil (MLA for Sangli Constituency No. 282- Sangli District) (Legislative Assembly) (Chief Minister)	07 February 1983	05 March 1985	2 years, 26 days	Indian National Congress	Vasantdada III	Vasantdada Patil
19		Narendra Mahipati Tidke (MLA for Savner Constituency No. 49- Nagpur District) (Legislative Assembly)	12 March 1985	03 June 1985	83 days	Indian National Congress	Vasantdada IV	Vasantdada Patil
20		Narendra Mahipati Tidke (MLA for Savner Constituency No. 49- Nagpur District) (Legislative Assembly)	03 June 1985	12 March 1986	282 days	Indian National Congress	Nilangekar	Shivajirao Patil Nilangekar
21		Vilasrao Deshmukh (MLA for Latur City Constituency No. 235- Latur District) (Legislative Assembly)	12 March 1986	26 June 1988	2 years, 106 days	Indian National Congress	Shankarrao II	Shankarrao Chavan
22		Abhaysinh Raje Bhosale (MLA for Satara Constituency No. 262- Satara District (Legislative Assembly)	26 June 1988	03 March 1990	1 year, 250 days	Indian National Congress	Pawar II	Sharad Pawar
23		Shankarrao Genuji Kolhe (MLA for Kopargaon Constituency No. 219- Ahmednagar District) (Legislative Assembly)	04 March 1990	25 June 1991	1 year, 113 days	Indian National Congress	Pawar III	
24		Shivajirao Deshmukh (MLC for Elected by MLAs Constituency No. 18 - Sangli District) (Legislative Council)	25 June 1991	22 February 1993	1 year, 242 days	Indian National Congress	Sudhakarrao	Sudhakarrao Naik
25		Abhaysinh Raje Bhosale (MLA for Satara Constituency No. 262- Satara District (Legislative Assembly)	06 March 1993	14 March 1995	2 years, 8 days	Indian National Congress	Pawar IV	Sharad Pawar
26		Jaiprakash Mundada (MLA for Basmath Constituency No. 92- Hingoli District (Legislative Assembly)	14 March 1995	01 February 1999	3 years, 324 days	Shiv Sena	Joshi	Manohar Joshi
27		Jaiprakash Mundada (MLA for Basmath Constituency No. 92- Hingoli District (Legislative Assembly)	01 February 1999	17 October 1999	258 days	Shiv Sena	Rane	Narayan Rane
28		Vikramsinh Patankar (MLA for Patan Constituency No. 261- Satara District) (Legislative Assembly)	19 October 1999	16 January 2003	3 years, 89 days	Nationalist Congress Party	Deshmukh I	Vilasrao Deshmukh
29		Ashok Chavan (MLA for Mudkhed Constituency No. 85- Nanded District) (Legislative Assembly)	18 January 2003	01 November 2004	1 year, 295 days	Indian National Congress	Sushilkumar	Sushilkumar Shinde
30		Vilasrao Deshmukh (MLA for Latur City Constituency No. 235- Latur District) (Legislative Assembly) (Chief Minister)	01 November 2004	09 November 2004	8 days	Indian National Congress	Deshmukh II	Vilasrao Deshmukh
31		Patangrao Kadam (MLA for Palus-Kadegaon Constituency No. 285- Sangli District) (Legislative Assembly)	09 November 2004	01 December 2008	4 years, 22 days	Indian National Congress	Deshmukh II	Vilasrao Deshmukh
32		Harshvardhan Patil (MLA for Indapur Constituency No. 200- Pune District (Legislative Assembly)	08 December 2008	06 November 2009	333 days	Independent	Ashok I	Ashok Chavan
33		Ramraje Naik Nimbalkar (MLC for Elected by MLAs Constituency No. 14 - Satara District) (Legislative Council)	07 November 2009	10 November 2010	1 year, 3 days	Nationalist Congress Party	Ashok II	Ashok Chavan
34		Harshvardhan Patil (MLA for Indapur Constituency No. 200- Pune District (Legislative Assembly)	11 November 2010	26 September 2014	3 years, 319 days	Indian National Congress	Prithviraj	Prithviraj Chavan
35		Chandrakant Patil (MLC for Pune Graduates Constituency No. 05 - Pune District) (Legislative Council)	31 October 2014	08 July 2016	1 year, 251 days	Bharatiya Janata Party	Fadnavis I	Devendra Fadnavis
36		Subhash Deshmukh (MLA for Solapur South Constituency No. 251- Solapur District (Legislative Assembly)	08 July 2016	12 November 2019	−2 years, 343 days	Bharatiya Janata Party	Fadnavis I	Devendra Fadnavis
37		Devendra Fadnavis (MLA for Nagpur South West Constituency No. 52- Nagpur District) (Legislative Assembly) (Chief Minister) (In Charge)	23 November 2019	28 November 2019	5 days	Bharatiya Janata Party	Fadnavis II	Devendra Fadnavis
38		Jayant Patil (MLA for Islampur Constituency No. 283- Sangli District) (Legislative Assembly)	28 November 2019	30 December 2019	32 days	Nationalist Congress Party	Thackeray	Uddhav Thackeray
39		Shamrao Pandurang Patil (MLA for Karad North Constituency No. 259- Satara District (Legislative Assembly)	30 December 2019	29 June 2022	2 years, 181 days	Nationalist Congress Party	Thackeray	Uddhav Thackeray
40		Eknath Shinde (MLA for Kopri-Pachpakhadi Constituency No. 147- Thane District) (Legislative Assembly) (Chief Minister) (In Charge)	30 June 2022	14 August 2022	45 days	Shiv Sena (2022–present)	Eknath	Eknath Shinde
41		Atul Save (MLA for Aurangabad East Constituency No. 109- Chhatrapati Sambhaji Nagar District Also Previously Known Aurangabad District (Legislative Assembly)	14 August 2022	14 July 2023	334 days	Bharatiya Janata Party	Eknath	Eknath Shinde
42		Dilip Walse-Patil (MLA for Ambegaon Constituency No. 196- Pune District) (Legislative Assembly)	14 July 2023	26 November 2024	1 year, 135 days	Nationalist Congress Party	Eknath	Eknath Shinde
43		Devendra Fadnavis (MLA for Nagpur South West Constituency No. 52- Nagpur District) (Legislative Assembly) (Chief_Minister); In Charge	05 December 2024	21 December 2024	16 days	Bharatiya Janata Party	Fadnavis III	Devendra Fadnavis
44		Babasaheb Mohanrao Patil (MLA for Ahmedpur Constituency No. 236- Latur District (Legislative Assembly)	21 December 2024	Incumbent	1 year, 261 days	Nationalist Congress Party	Fadnavis III	Devendra Fadnavis

== Ministers of State ==
No.	Portrait	Deputy Minister (Constituency)	Term of office			Political party	Ministry	Minister	Chief Minister
No.	Portrait	Deputy Minister (Constituency)	From	To	Period	Political party	Ministry	Minister	Chief Minister
Deputy Minister of Co-operation
Vacant			23 November 2019	28 November 2019	5 days	NA	Fadnavis II	Devendra Fadnavis	Devendra Fadnavis
01		Vishwajeet Kadam (MLA for Palus-Kadegaon Constituency No. 285- Sangli District) (Legislative Assembly)	30 December 2019	29 June 2022	2 years, 181 days	Indian National Congress	Thackeray	Shamrao Pandurang Patil	Uddhav Thackeray
Vacant			30 June 2022	26 November 2024	2 years, 149 days	+	Eknath	Eknath Shinde (2022 - 2022); Atul Save (2022 - 2023); Dilip Walse-Patil (2023 – 2024)	Eknath Shinde
02		Pankaj Rajesh Bhoyar (MLA for Wardha Constituency No. 47- Wardha District) (Legislative Assembly)	21 December 2024	incumbent	1 year, 261 days	Bharatiya Janata Party	Fadnavis III	Babasaheb Mohanrao Patil (2024 – Present)	Devendra Fadnavis
