= List of educational institutions in Latur district =

Latur is one of the many educational hubs in Maharashtra.

== Schools ==
=== Central Board of Secondary Education (CBSE Affiliated) ===
- Sant Tukaram National Model School, Latur
- Podar International School, Latur
- Christ International School
- Global Knowledge Public School, Latur
- Hizon discovery academy
- Jaihind School Udgir
- Jawahar Navodaya Vidhyalaya Latur
- Kendriya vidyalaya
- Raja Narayanlal Lahoti English School, Latur
- Sharada International School
- Smt. Prayag Karad English Medium High school,
- Swami Vivekanand Integration English School, Latur
- Shri Bankatlal lahoti English School, Latur
- MDA Royal International School, MDA Educational Campus, Kolpa, Tq & Dist Latur

=== Indian Certificate of Secondary Education ===
- Goldcrest High International School, Latur

=== Maharashtra State Board of Secondary and Higher Secondary Education ===
• Saraswati Vidyalay, Prakash Nagar, Latur

- Baswanappa Wale New English Medium School, Latur
- Shri Shanti Niketan English School Latur
- Kripa Sadan Convent School
- Shri Deshikendra Vidyalaya, Latur
- Dnyanprakash Vidyaniketan School, Latur
- Godavari Devi Kanya Vidyalay
- Global Knowledge Public School, Latur
- Jijamata Girls' School
- Rajasthan High School
- Shree Gujrathi English School G.S.S.
- Shri Keshavraj Vidyalaya, Latur
- Shri Bhagwan School, Latur
- Mahatma Phule Madhyamik Vidyalaya, Ltur
- Sane Guruji Prathmik Vidyalaya, Latur
- Swami Vivekanand Junior College, Latur
- Yeshwant Vidya Mandir, Sale Galli, Latur
- Yeshwant Vidyalaya

== Colleges ==
- Sandipani Technical Campus - Faculty of Engineering, Latur
- Rajarshi Shahu College, Latur
- College of Computer Science and Information Technology
- Dayanand Arts College, Latur
- Dayanand Commerce College, Latur
- Dayanand Science College, Latur
- MIT College of Commerce & Management Studies
- MIMSR – CPS [PGD courses]
- MIMSR – D.M.L.T. Courses
- Maharashtra Institute of Physiotherapy
- MIT College of Science and Computer Studies
- Mahatma Basweshwar College Latur
- Reliance Latur Pattern, Shree Tripura College, Latur

== ITI ==
- Government ITI, Latur
- Government Ladies ITI, Latur
- Government ITI for Backward Class, Latur
- Government ITI, Jalkot, Latur
- Latur College of ITI, Hasegaon. Tq.Ausa, Dist.Latur

== Nursing colleges ==
- Swara Institute of Nursing, Barshi Road, Latur
- Mandakini Nursing Institute, Barshi Road, Latur
- Dhanvantari Shikshan & Samajik Pratishthan, Sant Rambhau ANM School, Ahmedpur Dist - Latur
- Vishwabharati Senstha, Latur
- Abhinav Bahuddeshiya Sevabhavi Sanstha's New Vision School of Nursing, Latur
- Bhivrai Nursing School, Latur
- College of Nursing Latur
- Florence School of Nursing, Latur
- G.B.Patil School of Nursing, Udgir, Latur
- Indira Gandhi Nursing School, Barshi, Latur
- Indira Gandhi RANM Nursing School, Chakur, Latur
- Jawalge Nursing School, Latur
- Jijamata Nursing School, Latur
- Kalpataru Bahuuddeshiya Sevabhavi Sanstha's Latur School of Nursing, Latur
- Late Mahaling Swami Nursing School, Latur
- Latur Nursing School, Latur
- Maharashtra College of Nursing Majage Nagar, Latur
- Maharashtra Institute of Nursing Sciences - B.Sc. Nursing College
- Maharashtra Nursing School, Chakur
- Maharashtra College of Nursing (B.Sc. Nursing)
- Maharashtra School of Nursing (RGNM)
- Maharashtra College of Nursing (RANM)
- Matoshree Bahhuudeshiya Samajik Vikas Sanstha's Rashtramata Jijau Nursing School, Latur
- Matrubhoomi Nursing School, Udgir, Latur
- Mother Teresa Nursing Institute, Latur
- Navjeevan Institute of Nursing Sciences, Ahmedpur, Latur
- New Mothe Teresa RANM Nursing School, Udgir, Latur
- Parvatibai Patade Nursing School, Murud, Latur
- S.G. Nursing School, Latur
- Sant Rambhau ANM Nursing School, Latur
- Sarojini Naidu School of Nursing Chakur Latur
- Savitribai Phule Nursing Institute, Udgir, Latur
- Savitribai Phule Nursing School, Jalkot, Latur
- Shri Bhagwan Nursing School, Latur
- Suvidha Nursing, Latur
- Swami Vivekanand School of Nursing, Udgir, Latur
- Swami Vivekanand School of Nursing, Renapur
- Tirumalla RANM Nursing School, Latur
- Yeshwant Nursing School Latur

== Engineering colleges ==
- Sandipani Technical Campus - Faculty of Engineering, Latur
- Balaghat Engineering College, Rudha
- M. S. Bidve Engineering College, Latur
- Maharashtra College of Engineering, Nilanga
- Maharashtra Udayagiri Institute of Management & Technology, Somnathpur
- Vilasrao Deshmukh Foundations School of Technology Latur
- Vishveshwarayya Abhiyantriki Padvika Mahavidyalay, Almala, Ausa

== Pharmacy colleges ==
- Channabasweshwar Pharmacy College, Latur
- Mahatma Basveshwer Pharmacy College, Latur
- Dayanand College of Pharmacy, Latur
- Godavari Institute of Pharmacy, kolpa Latur
- Dagadojirao Deshmukh D Pharmacy College, Almala Tq Ausa Dist Latur
- Shivlingeshwar College of Pharmacy, Almala Tq Ausa Dist Latur

== Polytechnic colleges ==
- Sandipani Technical Campus - Faculty of Polytechnic, Latur
- Balghat Polytechnic College, Rudha
- Bharat Ratna Lata Mangeshkar Polytechnic Aurad Shahajani
- D.B Group of Institution, School of Technology (Polytechnic), Mahalangra
- Government Residential Women's Polytechnic, Latur
- Lal Bahadur Shastri Polytechnic Institute, Tondar Pati, Udgir
- N.B.S. Institute Of Polytechnic, Ausa, Latur
- Puranmal Lahoti Government Polytechnic, Latur
- Rajiv Gandhi Polytechnic, Kavalkhed, Udgir
- Rajiv Gandhi Institute of Polytechnic, Hasegaon
- Swami Vivekanand Institute of Polytechnic, Latur
- Vishveshwarayya Abhiyantriki Padvika Mahavidyalay, Almala, Ausa, Latur
- VDF School of Polytechnic, Latur

== Medical colleges ==
- Government Medical College, Latur
- Vilasrao Deshmukh Government Institute of Medical Sciences, Latur
- Maharashtra Institute of Medical Science & Research, Latur

== Veterinary, fishery and dairy colleges ==
- College of Dairy Technology, Udgir
- College of Fishery Science, Udgir
- College of Veterinary and Animal Sciences, Udgir

== Ayurvedic colleges ==
- Manajara Ayurvedic Medical College & Hospital, Latur
- Dhanwantari Ayurvedic Medical College, Udgir

== Dental colleges ==
- Maharashtra Institute of Dental Science & Research Latur

== Management studies ==
- Aspiring Careers (English Speaking & Soft Skills Training Center), Latur
- D.B Institute of Management & Research, Mahalangra, Latur
- School of Management (SMT)
- Maitree Institute of Management, Latur

== University sub-center ==
- S.R.T.M. University Sub Center Latur, Latur
- Maharshtra Animal and Fishery Sciences University, Nagpur, sub-center, Udgir
