= Vidura Nawale =

Indian politician

Member of Parliament, Lok Sabha
- In office 1991-1996
- Preceded by: Kisanrao Bankhele
- Succeeded by: Nivrutti Sherkar
- Constituency: Khed, Maharashtra

Personal details
- Born: 7 August 1941 Tathawade, Pune district, Bombay Presidency, British India
- Party: Indian National Congress
- Spouse: Mrs. Nirmala

Vidura Vithoba Nawale is an Indian politician. He was elected to the Lok Sabha, the lower house of the Parliament of India as a member of the Indian National Congress.
