= Khed Lok Sabha constituency =

Former constituency of the Indian parliament in Maharashtra

Coordinates: 18.8°N 73.9°E

Khed
- Former Lok Sabha constituency

Constituency details
- Country: India
- Region: Western India
- State: Maharashtra
- Established: 1957
- Abolished: 2009
- Reservation: None

Khed Lok Sabha constituency was a Lok Sabha (parliamentary) constituency in Maharashtra state in western India until 2008.

== Members of Parliament ==
Year	Member	Party
1952-57 : Seat did not exist
1957	Balasaheb Salunke	Scheduled Castes Federation
1962	R.K. Khadilkar	Indian National Congress
1967	R.K. Khadilkar	Indian National Congress
1971	Anantrao Patil	Indian National Congress
1977	Annasaheb Magar	Indian National Congress
1980	Ramkrishna More	Indian National Congress
1984	Ramkrishna More	Indian National Congress
1989	Kisanrao Bankhele	Janata Dal
1991	Vidura Nawale	Indian National Congress
1996	Nivrutti Sherkar	Indian National Congress
1998	Ashok Mohol	Indian National Congress
1999	Ashok Mohol	Nationalist Congress Party
2004	Shivajirao Adhalarao Patil	Shiv Sena
2009-Present : Seat did not exist

== See also ==
- Shirur Lok Sabha constituency
- Khed
- List of former constituencies of the Lok Sabha
