= Dhanora Budruk =

Village in Maharashtra

- Village
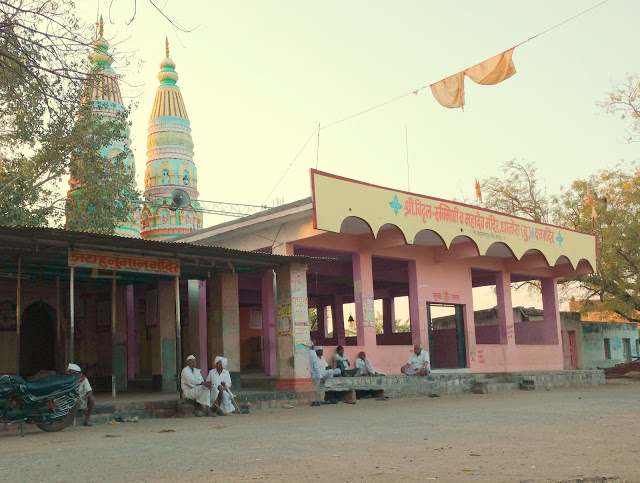
- Dhanora Budruk – Temple Area

- Dhanora Budruk in Maharashtra, India
- Coordinates: 18°41′14.1″N 76°46′23.7″E
- Country: India
- State: Maharashtra
- District: Latur
- Tehsil: Ahmadpur

Government
  - Body: Gram Panchayat

Area
  - Total: 1,355.3 ha (3,349 acres)

Population (2011)
  - Total: 3,202
- Demonym: Dhanorkar
- Time zone: UTC+05:30 (IST)
- Postal Code: 413523
- Vehicle registration: MH-24
- Nearest city: Ahmadpur
- Lok Sabha Constituency: Latur
- Vidhan Sabha Constituency: Ahmadpur

Dhanora Budruk is a village located in Ahmadpur Tehsil of Latur district in Maharashtra, India.

== Demographics ==
According to the Census of India 2011 information:
Dhanora Budruk has a total population of 3,202 people which includes 1667 males and 1535 females. There are 204 males and 201 females are in age group 0 to 6. There are about 692 houses in the village. A total of 2137 people are literate in this village out of that 1213 are males and 924 are females. Total irrigated land area of this village is around 75 hectares.

== Educational information ==
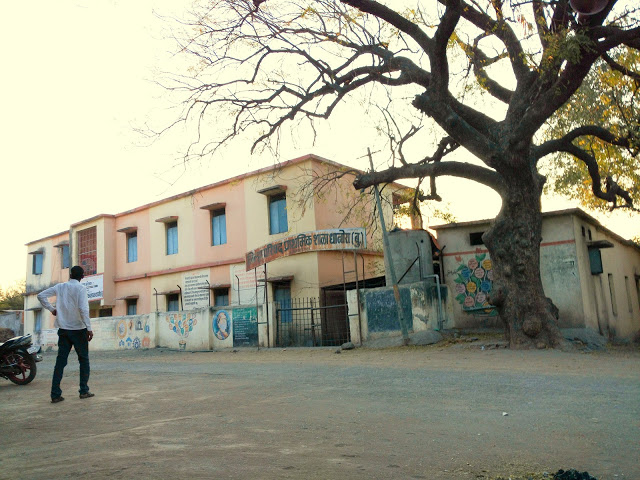
Zilla Parishad Prathamik Shala Dhanora Bk.

This village has one government school whose name is Zilla Parishad Prathamik Shala Dhanora Bk. Also available in this village is Vasant Vidyalaya Dhanora Bk. which is a private High school and is up to 10th class.
