= Balasaheb Salunke =

Indian politician

Member of Parliament, Lok Sabha
- In office 1957-1962
- Succeeded by: R.K. Khadilkar
- Constituency: Khed, Maharashtra

Personal details
- Born: 10 September 1920 Masur Khurd, Pune district, Bombay Presidency, British India
- Party: Scheduled Castes Federation
- Spouse: Chandrabai

Balasaheb Dagaduji Salunke is an Indian politician. He was elected to the Lok Sabha, the lower house of the Parliament of India as a member of the Scheduled Castes Federation.
