= Dilip Walse Patil =

Indian politician (born 1956)

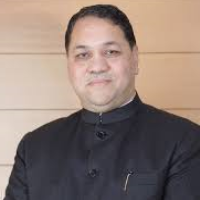

Cabinet Minister, Government of Maharashtra
- In office 2 July 2023 – 26 November 2024
- Minister: Co-operation
- Governor: Ramesh Bais C. P. Radhakrishnan
- Cabinet: Eknath Shinde ministry
- Chief Minister: Eknath Shinde
- Deputy Chief Minister: Devendra Fadnavis (first); Ajit Pawar (second)
- Guardian Minister: Buldhana (4 October 2023 – 26 November 2024)
- Preceded by: Atul Save
- Succeeded by: Babasaheb Mohanrao Patil

Cabinet Minister, Government of Maharashtra
- In office 5 April 2021 – 29 June 2022
- Ministry and Departments: Home Affairs
- Governor: Bhagat Singh Koshyari
- Chief Minister: Uddhav Thackeray
- Deputy CM: Ajit Pawar
- Preceded by: Anil Deshmukh
- Succeeded by: Devendra Fadnavis
- In office 30 December 2019 – 5 April 2021
- Ministry and Departments: State Excise; Labour
- Governor: Bhagat Singh Koshyari
- Chief Minister: Uddhav Thackeray
- Deputy CM: Ajit Pawar
- Preceded by: Chandrashekhar Bawankule (State Excise Ministry); Dr. Sanjay Kute (Labour Ministry)
- Succeeded by: Ajit Pawar (State Excise Ministry); Hasan Mushrif (Labour Ministry)

13th Speaker of Maharashtra Legislative Assembly
- In office 19 November 2009 – 30 September 2014
- Governor: Kateekal Sankaranarayanan; C. Vidyasagar Rao
- Chief Minister: Ashok Chavan; Prithviraj Chavan
- Preceded by: Babasaheb Kupekar
- Succeeded by: Haribhau Bagade

Cabinet Minister Government of Maharashtra
- In office 8 December 2008 – 6 November 2009
- Minister: Finance; Planning
- Governor: S. C. Jamir
- Chief Minister: Ashok Chavan
- Preceded by: Jayant Patil
- Succeeded by: Sunil Tatkare
- In office 9 November 2004 – 1 December 2008
- Minister: Medical Education; Energy
- Governor: Mohammed Fazal; S. M. Krishna; S. C. Jamir
- Chief Minister: Vilasrao Deshmukh
- Preceded by: Digvijay Khanvilkar
- Succeeded by: Sunil Tatkare
- In office 27 October 1999 – 16 January 2003
- Minister: Higher Education; Technical Education
- Governor: P.C. Alexander; Mohammed Fazal
- Chief Minister: Vilasrao Deshmukh
- Succeeded by: Suresh Jain

Member of the Maharashtra Legislative Assembly
- Incumbent
- Assumed office 1990
- Constituency: Ambegaon

Personal details
- Born: 30 October 1956 (age 70) Ambegaon, Bombay State, India (present-day Maharashtra)
- Party: Nationalist Congress Party
- Children: 1
- Relatives: Prakash Dahake (brother-in-law)
- Education: Government Law College, Mumbai (LL.M)
- Occupation: Politician
- Profession: Social activist

Dilip Dattatray Walse Patil (born 30 October 1956) is an Indian politician, from Ambegaon, Maharashtra, and an eight-time Member of the Maharashtra Legislative Assembly from Nationalist Congress Party (NCP). He is a minister in the Government of Maharashtra, since July 2023. He previously served as the Minister of Home Affairs in the Government of Maharashtra. He formerly headed the Ministry of Finance and Planning, Energy Ministry, Higher and Technical Education Ministry, and Medical Education Ministry, all as a cabinet minister from 1999 to 2009.

He also serves as the president of National Federation of Cooperative Sugar Factories Limited.

He became Maharashtra's home minister on 5 April 2021, succeeding Anil Deshmukh, who resigned due to graft charges.

== Career ==
Walse-Patil is a member of the Nationalist Congress Party, and was known to be a close associate of the then party President Sharad Pawar. Walse-Patil earlier served in the Government of Maharashtra as a minister with different portfolios such as Finance and Planning, Energy, Higher and Technical Education, and Medical Education.

Walse-Patil comes from a political family. He started his political career as a PA to Sharad Pawar, former chief minister of Maharashtra. He defeated Kisanrao Bankhele in Ambegaon in 1990 to become a MLA for the first time. At present he is still representing the same constituency for the eighth consecutive term.

Apart from the energy portfolio, Walse Patil also held the education portfolio in the Maharashtra cabinet.

Changes to make the admission procedure for medical seats more transparent were made during his tenure. He also encouraged the setup of new engineering colleges by easing the approval process. Maharashtra Knowledge Corporation (MKCL) is his creation, which has more than 5000 MSCIT centres all over Maharashtra. He played a key role in the establishment of Government College of Engineering as well as Polytechnic and engineering in 2009 at Avsari (K).

He took charge of the Ministry of Home Affairs, replacing Anil Deshmukh in the Thackeray ministry after the latter resigned due to graft charges, on 5 April 2021.

Preceded by Babasaheb Kupekar	Speaker of Maharashtra Assembly; 11 November 2009 – 10 November 2014	Succeeded by Haribhau Bagde
Preceded by Jayant Patil	Minister of Finance; 8 December 2008 –	Succeeded by Sunil Tatkare
