= Ambegaon Assembly constituency =

Constituency of the Maharashtra legislative assembly in India

Coordinates: 19.14°N 73.70°E

Ambegaon
- Constituency No. 196 for the Maharashtra Legislative Assembly

Constituency details
- Country: India
- Region: Western India
- State: Maharashtra
- District: Pune
- Lok Sabha constituency: Shirur (Lok Sabha constituency)
- Established: 1951
- Total electors: 314,885
- Reservation: None

Member of Legislative Assembly
- 15th Maharashtra Legislative Assembly
- Incumbent Dilip Walse-Patil
- Party: NCP
- Alliance: NDA
- Elected year: 2024

Ambegaon Assembly constituency is one of the many constituencies of the Maharashtra Vidhan Sabha located in the Pune district.

It is a part of the Shirur (Lok Sabha constituency) in the Pune district along with five other assembly constituencies, viz Junnar, Khed Alandi, Shirur, Bhosari and Hadapsar.

Dilip Walse-Patil is the current MLA and chairperson in the Maharashtra Government.

== Members of the Legislative Assembly ==
Election	Member	Party
1952	Awate Annasaheb Gopalrao	Indian National Congress
1957	Gholap Baburao Krishnaji	Independent politician
1962	Awate Annasaheb Gopalrao	Indian National Congress
1964 By-election	V. A. Awate	Indian National Congress
1967	D. G. Walase	Indian National Congress
1972	Kisanrao Bankhele	Independent politician
1978	Kale. B. D	Indian National Congress
1980	Kisanrao Bankhele	Janata Party
1985	Kisanrao Bankhele	Janata Party
1990	Dilip Walse Patil	Indian National Congress
1995	Dilip Walse Patil	Indian National Congress
1999	Dilip Walse Patil	Nationalist Congress Party
2004	Dilip Walse Patil	Nationalist Congress Party
2009	Dilip Walse Patil	Nationalist Congress Party
2014	Dilip Walse Patil	Nationalist Congress Party
2019	Dilip Walse Patil	Nationalist Congress Party
2024	Dilip Walse Patil	Nationalist Congress Party

== Election results ==
=== Assembly Election 2024 ===
2024 Maharashtra Legislative Assembly election : Ambegaon
Party	Candidate	Votes	%	±%
NCP	Dilip Walse Patil	106,888	48.29%	New
NCP-SP	Devdatta Jayvantrao Nikam	105,365	47.60%	New
Bhartiya Dharmanirpeksha Party	Devdatta Shivajirao Nikam	2,965	1.34%	New
MNS	Indore Sunil Kondaji	1,483	0.67%	New
NOTA	None of the above	1,157	0.52%	▼0.34
Margin of victory		1,523	0.69%	▼34.75
Turnout		222,515	70.67%	▲3.76
Total valid votes		221,358		
Registered electors		314,885		▲10.80
NCP gain from NCP		Swing	▼18.65	

=== Assembly Election 2019 ===
2019 Maharashtra Legislative Assembly election : Ambegaon
Party	Candidate	Votes	%	±%
NCP	Dilip Walse Patil	126,120	66.94%	▲4.40
SS	Bankhele Rajaram Bhivsen	59,345	31.50%	▼0.79
NOTA	None of the above	1,616	0.86%	▲0.18
Independent	Anita Shantaram Gabhale	1,234	0.65%	New
BSP	Ravindra Baburao Chavhan	1,137	0.60%	▲0.09
Margin of victory		66,775	35.44%	▲5.19
Turnout		190,147	66.91%	▼4.85
Total valid votes		188,416		
Registered electors		284,182		▲5.20
NCP hold		Swing	▲4.40	

=== Assembly Election 2014 ===
2014 Maharashtra Legislative Assembly election : Ambegaon
Party	Candidate	Votes	%	±%
NCP	Dilip Walse Patil	120,235	62.54%	▲4.37
SS	Arun Govindrao Gire	62,081	32.29%	▼4.12
BJP	Erande Jaysing Maruti	4,615	2.40%	New
INC	Bankhele Sandhya Devendra	2,408	1.25%	New
NOTA	None of the above	1,300	0.68%	New
Independent	Adhari Vijay Anant	1,205	0.63%	New
Margin of victory		58,154	30.25%	▲8.49
Turnout		193,846	71.76%	▲2.88
Total valid votes		192,239		
Registered electors		270,133		▲8.39
NCP hold		Swing	▲4.37	

=== Assembly Election 2009 ===
2009 Maharashtra Legislative Assembly election : Ambegaon
Party	Candidate	Votes	%	±%
NCP	Dilip Walse Patil	99,851	58.17%	▼5.85
SS	Adhalrao Kalpana Shivaji	62,502	36.41%	▲3.40
Independent	Suhas Chandrkant Sahane	1,906	1.11%	New
BSP	Anand Gunaji Sonawane	1,439	0.84%	New
RPI(A)	Chaudhari Parmeshwar Mahadu	1,400	0.82%	New
MNS	Dherange Sandeep Dashrath	1,233	0.72%	New
Independent	Bhaskar Namdevrao Gholap	1,079	0.63%	New
Margin of victory		37,349	21.76%	▼9.25
Turnout		171,649	68.88%	▼6.06
Total valid votes		171,649		
Registered electors		249,218		▲46.09
NCP hold		Swing	▼5.85	

=== Assembly Election 2004 ===
2004 Maharashtra Legislative Assembly election : Ambegaon
Party	Candidate	Votes	%	±%
NCP	Dilip Walse Patil	81,830	64.02%	▲11.20
SS	Adv. Avinash Tukaram Rahane	42,194	33.01%	▼2.05
Independent	Atmaram Ramchandra Dherange	1,234	0.97%	New
Margin of victory		39,636	31.01%	▲13.25
Turnout		127,846	74.94%	▲2.18
Total valid votes		127,811		
Registered electors		170,589		▲25.31
NCP hold		Swing	▲11.20	

=== Assembly Election 1999 ===
1999 Maharashtra Legislative Assembly election : Ambegaon
Party	Candidate	Votes	%	±%
NCP	Dilip Walse Patil	50,052	52.82%	New
SS	Adv. Avinash Tukaram Rahane	33,226	35.06%	New
INC	Gabhale Shrirang Vishnu	8,107	8.55%	▼42.47
Independent	Popat Sahadu Bhor	1,618	1.71%	New
Independent	Pandharinath Gyanbhau Walunj	767	0.81%	New
Margin of victory		16,826	17.76%	▲11.98
Turnout		99,049	72.76%	▼13.20
Total valid votes		94,764		
Registered electors		136,133		▲1.40
NCP gain from INC		Swing	▲1.80	

=== Assembly Election 1995 ===
1995 Maharashtra Legislative Assembly election : Ambegaon
Party	Candidate	Votes	%	±%
INC	Dilip Walse Patil	57,014	51.02%	▲14.28
JD	Kisanrao B. Bankhele	50,558	45.24%	▲41.12
Independent	Nandubhai Shekhlal Mujawar	1,412	1.26%	New
Independent	Prof. Bankhele Thaksen Nathaji	917	0.82%	New
Margin of victory		6,456	5.78%	▼5.77
Turnout		115,407	85.96%	▲19.89
Total valid votes		111,750		
Registered electors		134,257		▲5.41
INC hold		Swing	▲14.28	

=== Assembly Election 1990 ===
1990 Maharashtra Legislative Assembly election : Ambegaon
Party	Candidate	Votes	%	±%
INC	Dilip Walse Patil	30,354	36.74%	▲4.57
Independent	Patil Shivarajirao Marutrao	20,809	25.18%	New
SS	Mandalik Sudam Bapusaheb	16,526	20.00%	New
Independent	Borade Tukaram Sakharam	6,804	8.23%	New
JD	Bangar Bajrang Shankar	3,406	4.12%	New
Independent	Gabhale Shrirang Vishinu	2,830	3.42%	New
Independent	Thorat Namdeo Rajaram	570	0.69%	New
Margin of victory		9,545	11.55%	▼14.42
Turnout		84,150	66.07%	▲4.43
Total valid votes		82,628		
Registered electors		127,365		▲26.63
INC gain from JP		Swing	▼21.40	

=== Assembly Election 1985 ===
1985 Maharashtra Legislative Assembly election : Ambegaon
Party	Candidate	Votes	%	±%
JP	Kisanrao Bankhele	35,297	58.14%	New
INC	Padval Chhayatai	19,530	32.17%	New
Independent	Kengale Shankar Vithal	3,753	6.18%	New
Independent	Chinchodikar Bal Krishna Mahadeo	854	1.41%	New
Independent	Rakshe Martand Mahadeo	725	1.19%	New
Independent	Khude Genu Rama (Guruji)	410	0.68%	New
Margin of victory		15,767	25.97%	▲12.54
Turnout		61,998	61.64%	▲4.47
Total valid votes		60,714		
Registered electors		100,582		▲6.94
JP gain from JP		Swing	▲17.98	

=== Assembly Election 1980 ===
1980 Maharashtra Legislative Assembly election : Ambegaon
Party	Candidate	Votes	%	±%
JP	Kisanrao Bankhele	21,056	40.16%	New
INC(U)	Kale. B. D	14,013	26.73%	New
INC(I)	Valase Gulabrao Bhikaji	7,398	14.11%	▲12.44
Independent	Borade Tukaram Sakharam	7,181	13.70%	New
Independent	Bangar Patil Mahadeo Hari	2,595	4.95%	New
Margin of victory		7,043	13.43%	▲12.30
Turnout		53,773	57.17%	▼4.61
Total valid votes		52,426		
Registered electors		94,058		▲8.71
JP gain from INC		Swing	▼7.91	

=== Assembly Election 1978 ===
1978 Maharashtra Legislative Assembly election : Ambegaon
Party	Candidate	Votes	%	±%
INC	Kale. B. D	24,542	48.07%	▲24.56
JP	Temgire Kisan Shripati	23,967	46.94%	New
Independent	Marwadi Rajmal Chunilal	1,693	3.32%	New
INC(I)	Vasantrao Tukaram Gunjan	852	1.67%	New
Margin of victory		575	1.13%	▼51.18
Turnout		53,457	61.78%	▼0.83
Total valid votes		51,054		
Registered electors		86,524		▲3.00
INC gain from Independent		Swing	▼27.75	

=== Assembly Election 1972 ===
1972 Maharashtra Legislative Assembly election : Ambegaon
Party	Candidate	Votes	%	±%
Independent	Kisanrao Bankhele	38,908	75.82%	New
INC	Dattatraya V. Patil	12,065	23.51%	▼34.07
Independent	Madhavrao Dahitule	342	0.67%	New
Margin of victory		26,843	52.31%	▲16.26
Turnout		52,597	62.61%	▲2.25
Total valid votes		51,315		
Registered electors		84,002		▲8.90
Independent gain from INC		Swing	▲18.24	

=== Assembly Election 1967 ===
1967 Maharashtra Legislative Assembly election : Ambegaon
Party	Candidate	Votes	%	±%
INC	D. G. Walase	25,553	57.58%	New
PSP	D. K. Kale	9,554	21.53%	New
PWPI	K. R. Mundhe	5,698	12.84%	New
Independent	P. S. Duke	2,781	6.27%	New
Independent	J. D. Wathare	791	1.78%	New
Margin of victory		15,999	36.05%	
Turnout		46,563	60.36%	
Total valid votes		44,377		
Registered electors		77,137		
INC hold		Swing		

=== Assembly By-election 1964 ===
1964 Maharashtra Legislative Assembly by-election : Ambegaon
Party	Candidate	Votes	%	±%
INC	V. A. Awate	Unopposed		
INC hold		Swing		

=== Assembly Election 1962 ===
1962 Maharashtra Legislative Assembly election : Ambegaon
Party	Candidate	Votes	%	±%
INC	Awate Annasaheb Gopalrao	22,111	70.58%	▲28.72
PSP	Muruti Shripati Awate	4,812	15.36%	New
PWPI	Anant Chima Adhari	4,405	14.06%	New
Margin of victory		17,299	55.22%	▲38.94
Turnout		33,026	53.10%	▲14.04
Total valid votes		31,328		
Registered electors		62,193		▲11.96
INC gain from Independent		Swing	▲12.44	

=== Assembly Election 1957 ===
1957 Bombay State Legislative Assembly election : Ambegaon
Party	Candidate	Votes	%	±%
Independent	Gholap Baburao Krishnaji	12,614	58.14%	New
INC	Awate Annasaheb Gopalrao	9,082	41.86%	▼28.58
Margin of victory		3,532	16.28%	▼32.93
Turnout		21,696	39.06%	▼11.34
Total valid votes		21,696		
Registered electors		55,550		▼1.66
Independent gain from INC		Swing	▼12.30	

=== Assembly Election 1952 ===
1952 Bombay State Legislative Assembly election : Ambegaon
Party	Candidate	Votes	%	±%
INC	Awate Annasaheb Gopalrao	20,053	70.44%	New
PWPI	Padwal Maruti Govind	6,044	21.23%	New
Socialist	Saraswati Swami Madhavanand	2,372	8.33%	New
Margin of victory		14,009	49.21%	
Turnout		28,469	50.40%	
Total valid votes		28,469		
Registered electors		56,486		
INC win (new seat)				

== See also ==
- Pune district
- List of constituencies of the Maharashtra Legislative Assembly
