= Babasaheb Mohanrao Patil =

Indian politician (born 1958)

Babasaheb Jadhav Patil

Cabinet Minister Government of Maharashtra
- Incumbent
- Assumed office 15 December 2024
- Minister: Co-operation
- Governor: C. P. Radhakrishnan; Acharya Devvrat
- Cabinet: Third Fadnavis ministry
- Chief Minister: Devendra Fadnavis
- Deputy CM: Eknath Shinde; Ajit Pawar (till his demise in 2026) Sunetra Pawar (from 2026)
- Guardian Minister: NA
- Preceded by: Dilip Walse Patil

Member of the Maharashtra Legislative Assembly
- Incumbent
- Assumed office 27 November 2019
- Preceded by: Vinayakrao Jadhav
- Constituency: Ahmedpur
- In office 2009–2014
- Preceded by: Babruwan Khandade
- Succeeded by: Vinayak Kishanrao Jadhav
- Constituency: Ahmedpur

Personal details
- Born: Shirur (Taj)
- Party: Congress, RSP, Nationalist Congress Party
- Education: B.A.
- Profession: Politician

Babasaheb Mohanrao Jadhav (Patil) (born 5 December 1958) is an Indian politician from Maharashtra. He is a member of the Maharashtra Legislative Assembly from Ahmedpur Assembly constituency in Latur District. He won the 2019 Maharashtra Legislative Assembly election representing the Nationalist Congress Party.

== Early life and education ==
Jadhav is from Shirur (Taj.), Ahmedpur, Latur District, Maharashtra. His father Mohanrao Kishanrao Jadhav is a farmer. He completed his BA in 2000 at Swami Vivekanand College, Shirur Tajband, Ahmedpur, which is affiliated with Swami Ramanand Tirth Marathwada University, Nanded.

== Career ==
Jadhav won the Ahmedpur Assembly constituency representing the Nationalist Congress Party in the 2019 Maharashtra Legislative Assembly election. He polled 84,636 votes and defeated his nearest rival, Vinayakrao Kishanrao Jadhav Patil of the Bharatiya Janata Party, by a margin of 29,191 votes. He first became an MLA winning the 2009 Maharashtra Legislative Assembly election. In 2009, he polled 69,460 votes and defeated his closest opponent, Vinayakrao Kishanrao Jadhav Patil of the Indian National Congress, by a margin of 2,252 votes.
