= Nivrutti Sherkar =

Indian politician (born 1929)

Member of Parliament, Lok Sabha
- In office 1996-1998
- Preceded by: Vidura Nawale
- Succeeded by: Ashok Mohol
- Constituency: Khed, Maharashtra

Personal details
- Born: 30 August 1929 Shiroli Budruk, Pune district, Bombay Presidency, British India
- Party: Indian National Congress
- Spouse: Hirabai

Nivrutti Sherkar (born 30 August 1929) is an Indian politician. He was elected to the Lok Sabha, the lower house of the Parliament of India as a member of the Indian National Congress.
