= Shamrao Pandurang Patil =

Indian politician

Balasaheb Alias Shamrao Patil

Cabinet Minister Government of Maharashtra
- In office 30 December 2019 – 29 June 2022
- Minister: Co-operation; Marketing
- Governor: Bhagat Singh Koshyari
- Chief Minister: Uddhav Thackeray
- Deputy CM: Ajit Pawar

Member of Maharashtra Legislative Assembly
- In office 1999–2024
- Preceded by: Pandurang dadasaheb Patil
- Succeeded by: Manoj Ghorpade
- Constituency: Karad North

Personal details
- Party: Nationalist Congress Party – Sharadchandra Pawar
- Parent: Pandurang Dadasaheb Patil (father)

Balasaheb Alias Shamrao Pandurang Patil is an Indian politician who belongs to the Nationalist Congress Party. He has held office since 1999 in Karad North. He contested as an independent in 2009 and won. He lost the 2024 assembly elections.

His father, Pandurang Patil, was also an MLA from Karad North. The family heavily relies on cooperative sector (sugarcane factory, milk, education, banking) for their political purposes.

== Elections ==
- 1999: MLA - Karad North (NCP)
- 2004: MLA - Karad North (NCP)
- 2009: MLA - Karad North (Independent)
- 2014: MLA - Karad North (NCP)
- 2019: MLA - Karad North (NCP)
- 2019: Cabinet Minister For Co-operation and Marketing in Maharashtra
