= Shirur Tajband =

Village in Maharashtra

- Village
- Location in Maharashtra, India Shirur Tajband (India)
- Coordinates: 18.700008°N 76.933292°E
- Country: India
- State: Maharashtra
- District: Latur

Government
  - Body: Gram panchayat
- Elevation: 638 m (2,093 ft)

Population (2011)
  - Total: 10,577
- Demonym: Shirurkar

Languages
  - Official: Marathi
- Time zone: UTC+5:30 (IST)
- PIN: 413514
- Telephone code: 02381
- Vehicle registration: MH-24
- Sex ratio: 938 ♀/1000 ♂
- Literacy: 80%
- Distance from Latur: 56 kilometres (35 mi) E
- Distance from Ahmadpur: 10 kilometres (6.2 mi)

Shirur Tajband is a major village in Ahmadpur taluka of Latur district in Indian state of Maharashtra. As per 2011 census, village had population of 10,577 with literacy rate of 805 and average sex ratio of 938. Village is 10 km away from taluka headquarter Ahmadpur and 56 km away from district headquarter Latur.
