= Vinayakrao Kishanrao Jadhav Patil =

Bharatiya Janata Party member of the 13th Maharashtra Legislative Assembly

Vinayakrao Jadhav

Member of the Maharashtra Legislative Assembly
- In office 1999–2004
- Preceded by: Bhagwanrao Nagargoje
- Succeeded by: Babruwan Khandade
- Constituency: Ahmedpur
- In office October 2014 – October 2019
- Preceded by: Babasaheb Mohanrao Patil
- Succeeded by: Babasaheb Mohanrao Jadhav
- Constituency: Ahmedpur

Personal details
- Citizenship: India
- Party: Shiv Sena (May 2026)
- Other political affiliations: Nationalist Congress Party (Sharadchandra Pawar) (2023–2026); Bharatiya Janata Party (2019–2023); Indian National Congress (2009–2019); Independent (Before 2009)
- Children: 3 daughters
- Parent: Kishanrao Jadhav Patil Kalegaonkar (father)
- Occupation: Politician

Vinayakrao Kishanrao Jadhav-Kalegaonkar is an Indian politician, currently a member of the Nationalist Congress Party (Sharadchandra Pawar), who was a member of the 13th Maharashtra Legislative Assembly. He represented the Ahmedpur Assembly Constituency.

== See also ==
• Ahmedpur (Vidhan Sabha constituency)
