= Annasaheb Magar =

Indian politician

Annasaheb Magar was the former MP of 6th Lok Sabha, affiliated to Indian National Congress serving Khed (MH) Lok Sabha Constituency.
