= Ahmedpur, Latur =

Ahmedpur
- City
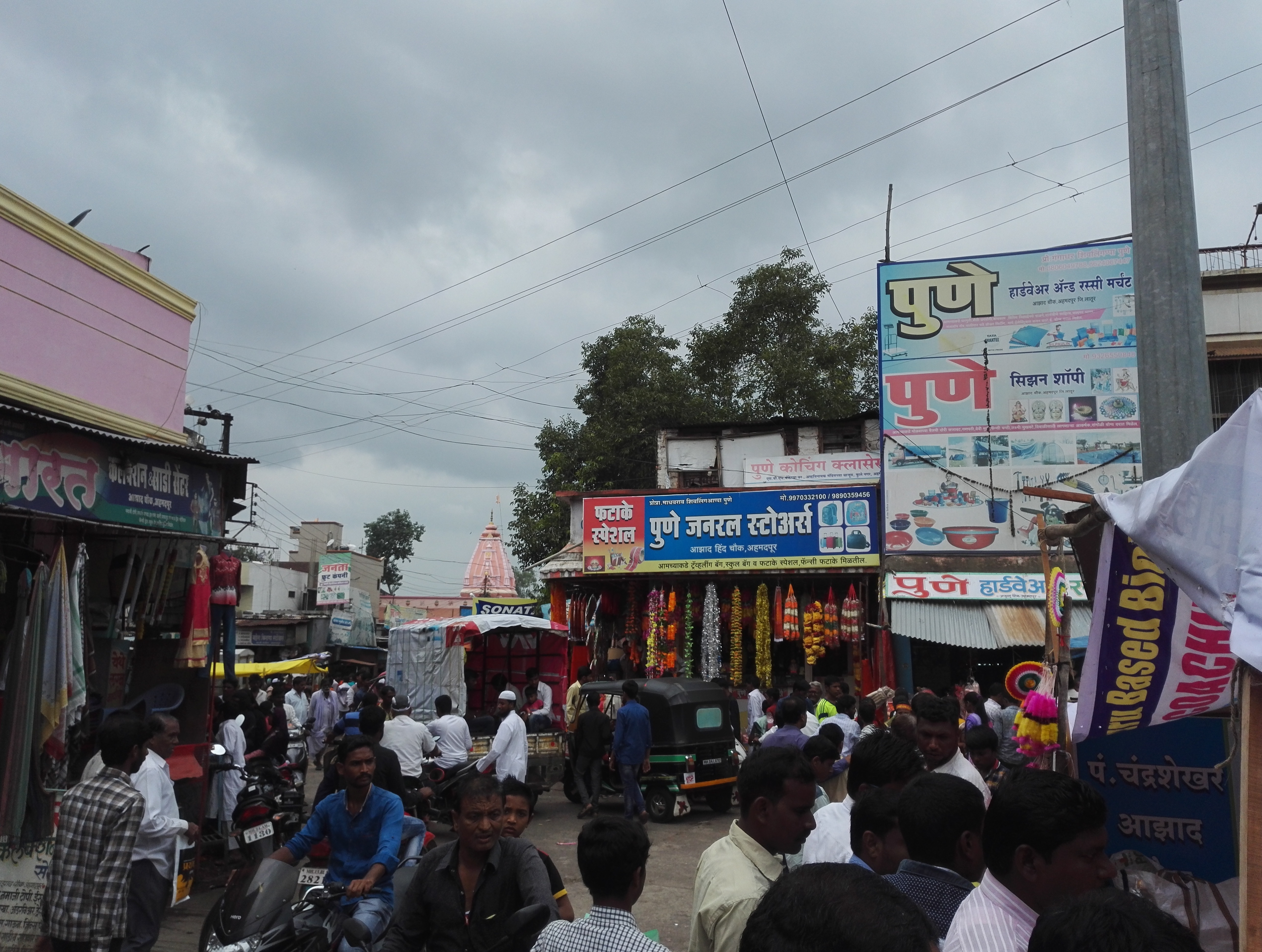
- Azaad Chowk, Ahmadpur

- Location in Maharashtra, India
- Coordinates: 18.700008°N 76.933292°E
- Country: India
- State: Maharashtra
- District: Latur

Government
  - Type: Municipal council
  - Body: AMC
  - Municipal President: Vacant

Population (2011)
  - Total: 44,000
- Demonyms: Ahmadpurkar

Languages
  - Official: Marathi
- Time zone: UTC+5:30 (IST)
- PIN: 413515
- Telephone code: 02381
- Vehicle registration: MH24 / MH55

Ahmedpur is a city in Latur district of Maharashtra state of India. Ahmedpur is 66 kms away from district headquarter Latur. It is the third largest city in Latur district.

== Demography ==
Ahmadpur's population of 23,936 of which 12,796 are males while 11,140 are females as per report released by Census India 2011.

Female Sex Ratio is of 927 against Maharashtra state average of 929. Literacy rate of Ahmadpur city is 82.67% higher than state average of 82.34%. In Ahmadpur, Male literacy is around 88.33% while female literacy rate is 76.61%.

Schedule Caste (SC) constitutes 14.84% while Schedule Tribe (ST) were 1.27% of total population in Ahmedpur.

Religions in Ahmedpur
Religion	Percent
Hindus	59.57%
Muslims	33.90%
Buddhists	5.85%
Christians	0.18%
Jains	0.12%
Atheist	0.29%
Others	0.00%
Distribution of religions Includes Sikhs (0.8%).

== Transport ==
Ahmedpur lies on NH 361 Nagpur Tuljapur road. Recently, a bypass road was constructed in Ahmedpur on NH 361.

Also, NH 548D originates at Ahmedpur & terminates at Talegaon Dabhade near Pune.

Nearest railway station to Ahmedpur is Latur Road junction railway station which is 31 kms away & Hazur Sahib Nanded railway station which has better connectivity to almost every state in India which is 68 kms from Ahmedpur.

== Education ==
Balaghat Engineering College is located in Rudha, Ahmedpur.

- Mahatma Gandhi College, Mahatma Phule Vidyalaya & Yeshwant Vidyalaya are also located in Ahmedpur.

== Government and politics ==
Ahmedpur comes under Latur (Lok Sabha constituency) for Indian general elections and current member of Parliament representing this constituency is Sudhakar Shringare of Bhartiya Janata Party.

Ahmedpur comes under Ahmedpur (Vidhan Sabha constituency) for assembly elections of Maharashtra. Current representative from this constituency in Maharashtra state assembly is Babasaheb Mohanrao Patil.

== See also ==
- Shirur Tajband, major village in Ahmedpur taluka
