= Balaghat Engineering College, Rudha =

College in Maharashtra, India

Balaghat Engineering College, Ahmedpur
- Established: 2009
- Affiliations: Swami Ramanand Teerth Marathwada University, COEP Tech. University
- Principal: Dr. S. N. Agashe
- Location: Rudha, Ahmedpur Tehsil, Latur district, Maharashtra, India; 18°45′40″N 76°57′37″E
- Website: www.balaghatengineering.com

Balaghat Engineering College (BEC), is located at Rudha in Ahmedpur Tehsil in Latur district of Maharashtra state. The college was founded in 2009. The college provides both diploma and degree education. In degree education, the college provides education in Civil, Computer, Electrical, Electronics & Telecommunication and Mechanical engineering and has 60 seats per branch. The departments received accreditation from All India Council for Technical Education (AICTE) in 2010 when they started. The college is unaided, non-autonomous and non-minority. In 2013 it was affiliated with the Swami Ramanand Teerth Marathwada University, Nanded. By 2024 it was affiliated with Savitribai Phule Pune University. The college is co-ed in nature and also has separate hostel facilities.The college is managed by Shree Ganesh Shikshan Prasarak Mandal (SGSPM).
