= Mahatma Basweshwar College Latur =

College in Maharashtra, India

Basweshwar College latur
- Motto: Kaykave Kailas (body is sacred)
- Type: Private
- Established: June 1970
- Chairman: Shivshankar Mallikarjun Bidave
- Principal: Dr. Dinesh maune
- Academic staff: 72
- Administrative staff: 15
- Students: 2,000
- Undergraduates: 900
- Postgraduates: 50
- Location: Latur, Maharashtra, India
- Affiliations: UGC Swami Ramanand Teerth Marathwada University
- Website: basweshwarcollegelatur.com

Mahatma Basweshwar College Latur is a college located in Latur. In pursuance with Mahatma Basweshwar’s dream, Shri Mahatma Basweshwar Education Society has been established in 1963 at Latur. This Society is one of the oldest & reputed educational societies in Marathwada region. It is run by Mahatma Bashweshwar Education Society, It has divisions for arts, commerce, science, B.C.A. and social work.

Students join the college after finishing 12th standard education in schools and may study until bachelor's or master's degree.

In the 12th generation hon’ble Mahatma Basweshwar has commenced the social works in the nature of structural and activism. The object behind this social work is the development of society, development of religion, enforcement of welfare schemes, promotion of education in mother tongue, promotion of scientific attitude, prevention of superstitions and development of cast women. This college was established in 1970.

The college is one of the famous colleges in Marathwada. It is located in the central area of the city. The college has got a new identity in the education. It regularly arranges Arts, Sports, Music Programmes and cultural programmes. It provides hostel facilities to the students who come from villages which are out of the city. In the period of 40 years it has created careers of students who have obtained several renowned posts.

The college is one of the colleges which continues the process of teaching and learning jointly of Arts, Commerce, Social Work and science education which has granted by the Swami Ramanand Teerth Marathwada University of Nanded District. The college provides the master education in the subjects of History, Social Science, Psychology, Political Science, Geography and Mathematics. Also, it provides Minimum Competency of Vocational Course (M.C.V.C.).

After the survey of the college's success by U.G.C. (University Grant Commission) College obtained ‘A’ grade by NAAC committee. The college has achieved great success in the competent examinations of Board, Universities, NET, SET and MHT-CET. Also, it has achieved great success in the Arts, Sports, Cultural youth festival, Entertainment and Music.

The college has settled in the central area of the city with all facilities. The society has constructed four new attractive buildings with a large playground with all facilities. It provides a library and reading-room to the scholar students. Its reading-room seating capacity is 250 students.

The time of reading-room is from 8:00 a.m. to 12:00 p.m. Also, it provides laboratory facilities for the students of science. It has established the ‘research center’ which has been authorized by the University of Nanded for the 30 Ph.D. students who are involved in the study of Geography and Psychology subjects.

== Courses offered ==
=== Degree courses ===
#	Course	Duration	Eligibility
01	B.A.	Three Years (Six Semesters)	10+2 Pass with Science Stream or Its equivalent
02	BCA	Three Years (Six Semesters)	10+2 Pass with Any Stream or Its Equivalent
03	B.Sc. (General)	Three Years (Six Semesters)	10+2 Pass with Science Stream or Its Equivalent
04	B.Sc. C.S.	Three Years (Annual Pattern)	10+2 Pass with Science Stream
05	B.Com.	Three Years (Six Semesters)	10+2 Pass or its equivalent
06	BSW	Three Years (Six Semesters)	10+2 Pass or its equivalent

=== Postgraduate courses ===
#	Course	Duration	Eligibility
01	M.Sc. C.S.	Two Years (Four Semesters)	B.Sc. C.s., B.C.A., B.Sc. with CS/IT/Comp. App., B.E.(CS)
02	M.A. (History)	Two Years (Four Semesters)	B.A. with History
03	M.A. (Sociology)	Two Years (Four Semesters)	B.A. with Sociology
04	M.A. (Philosophy)	Two Years (Four Semesters)	B.A. with Economics
05	M.A. (Geography)	Two Years (Four Semesters)	B.A. with Geography
06	M.A. (Political Science)	Two Years (Four Semesters)	B.A. with Sanskrit
07	M.Sc. (Mathematics)	Two Years (Four Semesters)	B.Sc. With Mathematics

== Notable alumni & academics ==
- Abhimanyu Pawar, BJP politician & member of Maharashtra legislative assembly
