= Maharashtra Knowledge Corporation =

Public limited company in Maharashtra, India

Maharashtra Knowledge Corporation Limited. (MKCL)
- Company type: Public
- Founded: 20 August 2001
- Headquarters: Pune, India
- Key people: Dilip Walse Patil; Vivek Sawant; Vijay Bhatkar; Ram Takwale; Dr.Anil Kakodkar
- Products: eLearning, Development, eGovernance, eEmpowerment
- Parent: Government of Maharashtra
- Website: http://www.mkcl.org

Maharashtra Knowledge Corporation Limited is a public limited company promoted by the Department of Higher and Technical Education, Government of Maharashtra, India. and was incorporated under the Companies Act.

On 5 January 2018 the Department of Higher and Technical Education (H & TE), Government of Maharashtra (GOM) issued a Government Resolution, as per which, in place of H & TE Department, the General Administration Department (GAD) has become the Representative Department of GOM for matters concerning MKCL.

== Operations ==
Company has its registered office and operations & Development center at ICC Pune. It has offices in India and in its subsidiaries MKCL Arabia. The present MD (Managing Director) of MKCL is Mr.Sameer Pande. Over 5,000 Authorized Learning Centers registered in Maharashtra. MKCL's endeavour in the field of IT education is marked by courses like MS-CIT (Maharashtra State Certificate in Information Technology), MS-ACIT and many other vocational courses affiliated to YCMOU under the brand KLiC (Knowledge Lit Careers), MKCL ERA (eLearning Revolution for All) etc.

=== In India ===
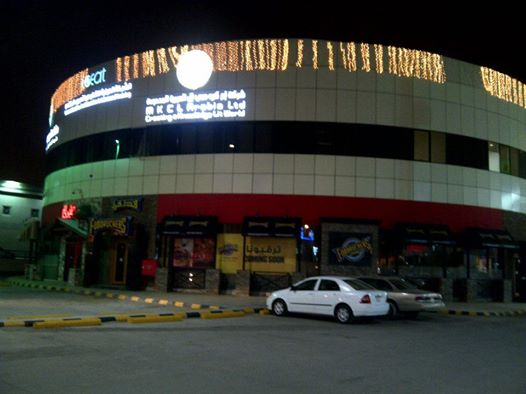
MKCL Arabia Office

MKCL has established and is establishing Joint Venture companies with the various State Governments by investing MKCL’s funds towards 30% of the initial equity.

=== Abroad ===
MKCL has also created joint ventures abroad through its subsidiary viz. MKCL International FZE, Sharjah, UAE. MKCL Arabia Ltd. (in Saudi Arabia along with its branch in Egypt) and MKCL Lanka Ltd. (in Sri Lanka) are the existing Joint Ventures.
