= Karad North Assembly constituency =

Constituency of the Maharashtra legislative assembly in India

Coordinates: 17.31°N 74.20°E

Karad North
- Constituency No. 259 for the Maharashtra Legislative Assembly

Constituency details
- Country: India
- Region: Western India
- State: Maharashtra
- District: Satara
- Lok Sabha constituency: Satara
- Established: 1951 (independent India)
- Total electors: 308,438
- Reservation: None

Member of Legislative Assembly
- 15th Maharashtra Legislative Assembly
- Incumbent Manoj Ghorpade
- Party: BJP
- Elected year: 2024

Karad North Assembly constituency of Maharashtra Vidhan Sabha is one of the constituencies located in Satara district.

It is a part of the Satara (Lok Sabha constituency), along with five other assembly constituencies, viz Wai, Karad South, Koregaon, Satara and Patan from the Satara district.

== Members of the Legislative Assembly ==
Election	Member	Party
1952	Yashwantrao Balwantrao Chavan	Indian National Congress
1957	Yashwantrao Balwantrao Chavan	Indian National Congress
1962	Yashwantrao Balwantrao Chavan	Indian National Congress
1967	Y. B. Patail	Indian National Congress
1972	Kotwal Baburao Ramchandra	Indian National Congress
1978	Keshavrao Patloji Pawar	Peasants and Workers Party of India
1980	Pandurang Dadasaheb Patil	Indian National Congress
1985	Ashtekar Shyam Alias Janardan Balkrishna	Indian Congress
1990	Ashtekar Shyam Alias Janardan Balkrishna	Indian National Congress
1995	Pandurang Dadasaheb Patil	Independent politician
1999	Shamrao Pandurang Patil	Nationalist Congress Party
2004	Shamrao Pandurang Patil	Nationalist Congress Party
2009	Shamrao Pandurang Patil	Independent politician
2014	Shamrao Pandurang Patil	Nationalist Congress Party
2019	Shamrao Pandurang Patil	Nationalist Congress Party
2024	Manoj Ghorpade	Bharatiya Janata Party

== Election results ==
=== Assembly Election 2024 ===
2024 Maharashtra Legislative Assembly election : Karad North
Party	Candidate	Votes	%	±%
BJP	Manoj Ghorpade	134,626	58.45	New
NCP-SP	Shamrao Pandurang Patil	90,935	39.48	New
RSPS	Somnath Ramesh Chavan	1,697	0.74	New
NOTA	None of the above	959	0.42	▼0.23
Margin of victory		43,691	18.97	▼5.87
Turnout		231,281	74.98	▲6.97
Total valid votes		230,322		
Registered electors		308,438		▲4.74
BJP gain from NCP		Swing	▲7.73	

=== Assembly Election 2019 ===
2019 Maharashtra Legislative Assembly election : Karad North
Party	Candidate	Votes	%	±%
NCP	Shamrao Pandurang Patil	100,509	50.72	▲9.37
Independent	Manoj Ghorpade	51,294	25.88	New
SS	Dhairyashil Dnyandeo Kadam	39,791	20.08	▲17.09
VBA	Subhash Baburao Pisal	3,983	2.01	New
BSP	Jagannath Laxman Waghamare	1,827	0.92	▲0.39
NOTA	None of the above	1,280	0.65	▲0.09
Margin of victory		49,215	24.84	▲14.01
Turnout		200,259	68.01	▼0.62
Total valid votes		198,167		
Registered electors		294,470		▲6.05
NCP hold		Swing	▲9.37	

=== Assembly Election 2014 ===
2014 Maharashtra Legislative Assembly election : Karad North
Party	Candidate	Votes	%	±%
NCP	Shamrao Pandurang Patil	78,324	41.35	▲7.31
INC	Dhairyashil Dnyandeo Kadam	57,817	30.52	New
SWP	Manoj Bhimrao Ghorpade	43,903	23.18	New
SS	Narendra Mohanrao Patil	5,657	2.99	▼2.68
MNS	Raju Shankar Kenjale	2,091	1.10	▲0.44
NOTA	None of the above	1,056	0.56	New
Margin of victory		20,507	10.83	▼12.26
Turnout		190,551	68.63	▼1.25
Total valid votes		189,410		
Registered electors		277,663		▲8.81
NCP gain from Independent		Swing	▼15.77	

=== Assembly Election 2009 ===
2009 Maharashtra Legislative Assembly election : Karad North
Party	Candidate	Votes	%	±%
Independent	Shamrao Pandurang Patil	101,658	57.12	New
NCP	Atul Suresh Bhosale	60,571	34.04	▼13.90
SS	Vasudeo Hanmant Mane	10,082	5.67	New
Independent	Patil Balaso Pandurang	1,884	1.06	New
BSP	Pawar Vilas Babu	1,362	0.77	▲0.01
MNS	Ashokrao Ganapatrao Chavan	1,173	0.66	New
Margin of victory		41,087	23.09	▲20.66
Turnout		178,315	69.88	▼0.15
Total valid votes		177,962		
Registered electors		255,179		▲19.51
Independent gain from NCP		Swing	▲9.18	

=== Assembly Election 2004 ===
2004 Maharashtra Legislative Assembly election : Karad North
Party	Candidate	Votes	%	±%
NCP	Shamrao Pandurang Patil	71,541	47.94	▲0.26
Independent	Arun Sopanrao Jadhav	67,920	45.52	New
BJP	Pradip Ashokrao Salunkhe(kiwalkar)	4,438	2.97	▼4.99
Independent	Adv. Ravindra Keshavrao Pawar	3,516	2.36	New
BSP	Bhosale Ashok Anna	1,133	0.76	New
Margin of victory		3,621	2.43	▼11.29
Turnout		149,535	70.03	▼0.07
Total valid votes		149,218		
Registered electors		213,528		▲15.71
NCP hold		Swing	▲0.26	

=== Assembly Election 1999 ===
1999 Maharashtra Legislative Assembly election : Karad North
Party	Candidate	Votes	%	±%
NCP	Shamrao Pandurang Patil	59,427	47.68	New
INC	Anandarao Raghoji Patil	42,322	33.96	▼4.16
BJP	Prof. Bhingardeve Jijaba Tukaram (Abba)	9,919	7.96	▲0.01
Independent	Patil Ashok Yashwant	9,009	7.23	New
PWPI	Adv. Ravindra Keshavrao Pawar	3,952	3.17	New
Margin of victory		17,105	13.72	▲3.11
Turnout		129,361	70.10	▼6.65
Total valid votes		124,629		
Registered electors		184,540		▲0.57
NCP gain from Independent		Swing	▼1.05	

=== Assembly Election 1995 ===
1995 Maharashtra Legislative Assembly election : Karad North
Party	Candidate	Votes	%	±%
Independent	Pandurang Dadasaheb Patil	67,467	48.73	New
INC	Patil Anandrao Raghoji	52,779	38.12	▼13.67
BJP	Rajabhav Deshpande	11,001	7.95	▲3.79
JD	Kachhi Unus Ahmed	1,422	1.03	New
Independent	Bhosale Ashok Anna	1,289	0.93	New
BBM	Hulwan Gajanan Pandurang	989	0.71	New
Samajwadi Janata Party (Maharashtra)	Kavale Ramchandra Bhau	939	0.68	New
Independent	Patil Indubai Kakasaheb	929	0.67	New
Margin of victory		14,688	10.61	▼16.27
Turnout		140,821	76.75	▲10.66
Total valid votes		138,445		
Registered electors		183,487		▲6.55
Independent gain from INC		Swing	▼3.06	

=== Assembly Election 1990 ===
1990 Maharashtra Legislative Assembly election : Karad North
Party	Candidate	Votes	%	±%
INC	Ashtekar Shyam Alias Janardan Balkrishna	58,243	51.79	▲6.29
Independent	Babasaheb Chorekar	28,014	24.91	New
Independent	Kotwal Baburao Ramchandra	9,968	8.86	New
PWPI	Pawar Ravindra Keshavrao	8,798	7.82	New
BJP	Bhausaheb Surywanshi	4,677	4.16	New
Independent	Bhingardeve Jijaba Tukaram	1,875	1.67	New
Margin of victory		30,229	26.88	▲18.94
Turnout		113,808	66.09	▼4.18
Total valid votes		112,452		
Registered electors		172,209		▲32.46
INC gain from IC(S)		Swing	▼1.65	

=== Assembly Election 1985 ===
1985 Maharashtra Legislative Assembly election : Karad North
Party	Candidate	Votes	%	±%
IC(S)	Ashtekar Shyam Alias Janardan Balkrishna	48,134	53.44	New
INC	Pandurang Dadasaheb Patil	40,978	45.50	New
RPI	Gokhale Bhiku Ramchandra	958	1.06	New
Margin of victory		7,156	7.94	▼23.62
Turnout		91,348	70.27	▲4.39
Total valid votes		90,070		
Registered electors		130,004		▲10.92
IC(S) gain from INC(U)		Swing	▼1.46	

=== Assembly Election 1980 ===
1980 Maharashtra Legislative Assembly election : Karad North
Party	Candidate	Votes	%	±%
INC(U)	Pandurang Dadasaheb Patil	41,650	54.90	New
INC(I)	Lad Jaysing Baburao	17,707	23.34	▲11.19
PWPI	Keshavrao Patloji Pawar	12,854	16.94	▼29.59
BJP	Pawar Annaji Govind	3,295	4.34	New
Margin of victory		23,943	31.56	▲20.57
Turnout		77,218	65.88	▼5.71
Total valid votes		75,862		
Registered electors		117,205		▲9.01
INC(U) gain from PWPI		Swing	▲8.37	

=== Assembly Election 1978 ===
1978 Maharashtra Legislative Assembly election : Karad North
Party	Candidate	Votes	%	±%
PWPI	Keshavrao Patloji Pawar	35,141	46.53	New
INC	Kotwal Baburao Ramchandra	26,843	35.54	▼41.96
INC(I)	Salunkhe Bhikoba Appaji	9,180	12.15	New
Independent	Chavan Raghunath Govind	1,989	2.63	New
CPI	Mulla Badashaha Alli	1,472	1.95	▼9.58
Margin of victory		8,298	10.99	▼54.98
Turnout		76,978	71.59	▼0.43
Total valid votes		75,526		
Registered electors		107,521		▲10.31
PWPI gain from INC		Swing	▼30.97	

=== Assembly Election 1972 ===
1972 Maharashtra Legislative Assembly election : Karad North
Party	Candidate	Votes	%	±%
INC	Kotwal Baburao Ramchandra	53,094	77.50	▲18.38
CPI	D. M. Patil	7,899	11.53	New
RPI	Veer Hanamant Ramchandra	2,737	4.00	New
ABJS	Ramchandra L. Panaskar	2,735	3.99	▼1.51
Independent	Kakashev R. Thorat	2,040	2.98	New
Margin of victory		45,195	65.97	▲37.34
Turnout		70,206	72.02	▼5.43
Total valid votes		68,505		
Registered electors		97,476		▲20.43
INC hold		Swing	▲18.38	

=== Assembly Election 1967 ===
1967 Maharashtra Legislative Assembly election : Karad North
Party	Candidate	Votes	%	±%
INC	Y. B. Patail	35,285	59.12	▼12.57
PWPI	A. G. Pawar	18,196	30.49	▲3.67
ABJS	G. V. Deshpande	3,283	5.50	New
Independent	S. V. Jagtap	2,924	4.90	New
Margin of victory		17,089	28.63	▼16.24
Turnout		62,687	77.45	▼4.57
Total valid votes		59,688		
Registered electors		80,940		▲13.49
INC hold		Swing	▼12.57	

=== Assembly Election 1962 ===
1962 Maharashtra Legislative Assembly election : Karad North
Party	Candidate	Votes	%	±%
INC	Yashwantrao Balwantrao Chavan	40,713	71.69	▲20.03
PWPI	Keshav Pataloji Pawar	15,231	26.82	▼21.52
Independent	Mahamud Abdul Awte	697	1.23	New
Margin of victory		25,482	44.87	▲41.55
Turnout		58,499	82.02	▼1.25
Total valid votes		56,793		
Registered electors		71,321		▲21.29
INC hold		Swing	▲20.03	

=== Assembly Election 1957 ===
1957 Bombay State Legislative Assembly election : Karad North
Party	Candidate	Votes	%	±%
INC	Yashwantrao Balwantrao Chavan	25,297	51.66	▲1.33
PWPI	Keshavrao Patloji Pawar	23,671	48.34	▼1.33
Margin of victory		1,626	3.32	▲2.66
Turnout		48,968	83.27	▲16.19
Total valid votes		48,968		
Registered electors		58,803		▲25.87
INC hold		Swing	▲1.33	

=== Assembly Election 1952 ===
1952 Bombay State Legislative Assembly election : Karad North
Party	Candidate	Votes	%	±%
INC	Yashwantrao Balwantrao Chavan	15,773	50.33	New
PWPI	Keshavrao Patloji Pawar	15,565	49.67	New
Margin of victory		208	0.66	
Turnout		31,338	67.08	
Total valid votes		31,338		
Registered electors		46,718		
INC win (new seat)				

== See also ==
- List of constituencies of Maharashtra Legislative Assembly
- Karad
