= Raghunath Keshav Khadilkar =

R. K. Khadilkar
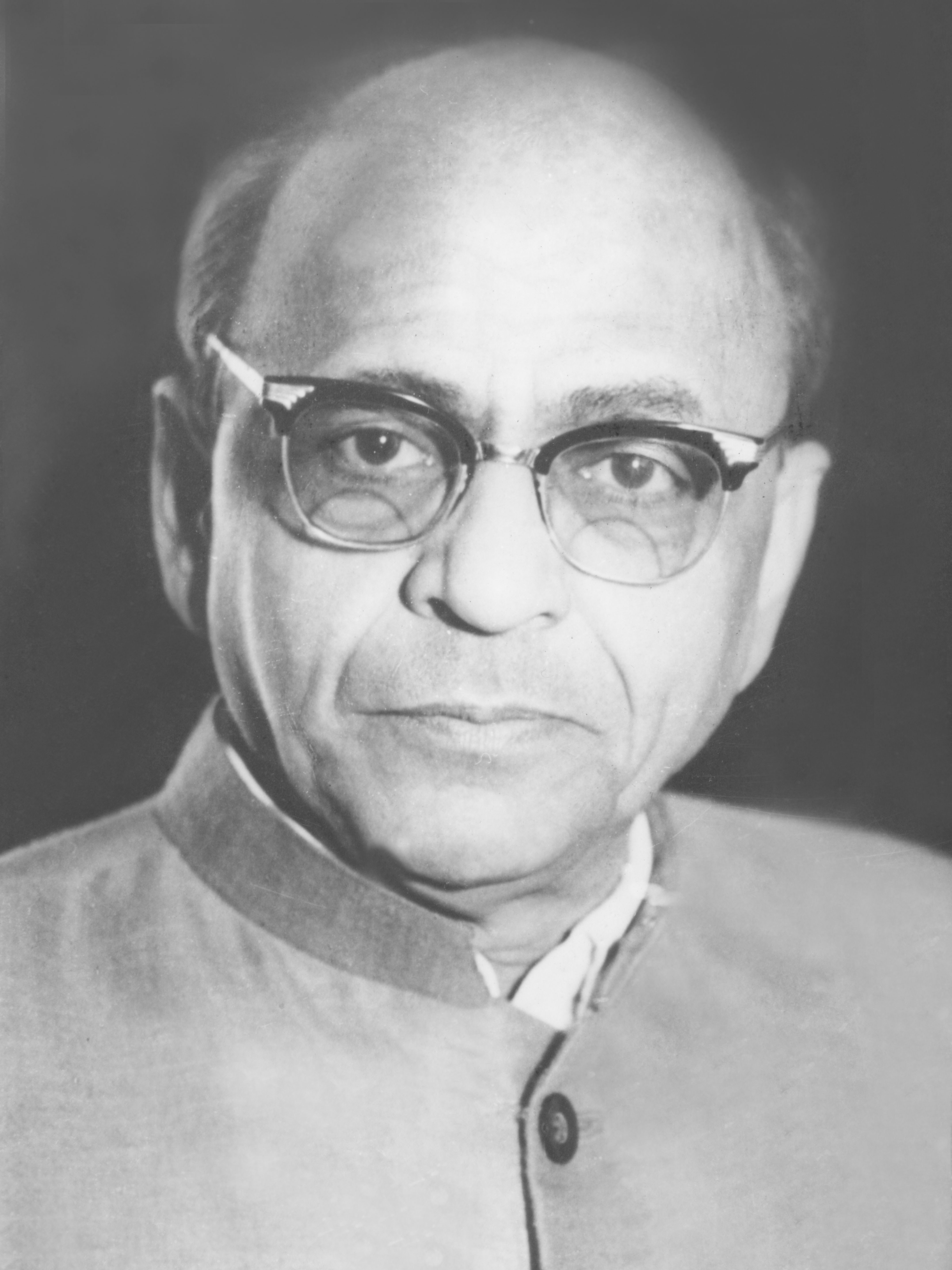
- Raghunath Keshav Khadilkar

Deputy Speaker of the Lok Sabha
- In office 28 marach 1967 – 1 Nov 1969
- Speaker: Hukam Singh

Personal details
- Born: 15 December 1905 Naringa Village, Taluk Devgad, District Ratnagiri, Bombaby Presidency, British India
- Died: 8 March 1979 (aged 73)
- Education: B.A., LL.B.
- Alma mater: Fergusson College, ILS Law College
- Occupation: Union Minister, Freedom Fighter

Raghunath Keshav Khadilkar (15 December 1905 – 8 March 1979) was a union minister, freedom fighter, and a thought leader from Pune, Maharashtra.

During his term as Union Minister for Labour, Khadilkar, championed a formula to raise the minimum bonus from 4% to 8.33% (1/12th of annual salary). The Bonus Review Committee appointed in 1971 endorsed what came to be known as the Khadilkar formula. The Government enforced this formula by the Payment of Bonus Act, 1972. Under the Act, the quantum of minimum bonus was raised to 8.33%. This practice of giving one month's salary as bonus to workers (especially during Diwali) is widely followed by households and businesses even today.

He served as 4rd Deputy Speaker of Lok Sabha from 1967 to 1969, Minister of Supply, from 1969 to 1971, and Minister of Labour and Rehabilitation in 1971.

As a social and political activist, Khadilkar served several terms of imprisonment between 1930 and 1945 during India's freedom movement. He was one of the founder Members of the Congress Socialist Party in 1934, and elected member of its National Executive in 1936. He left Congress in 1948 to form the All India Peasants’ and Workers' Party with other colleagues. He was elected as its General Secretary in 1953. In 1955, he took a leading part in forming the All India Mazdoor Kisan Party, a coalition of seven leftist organizations, and was elected Secretary Convener of the Central Committee.

He was member of the second Lok Sabha elected from Ahmednagar as Mazdoor Kisan Party candidate in 1957. After completion of his term in 1962, he re-joined the Congress, consequent to the merger of the Mazdoor Kisan Party with the Congress. As a Congress candidate he won both the 3rd and 4th Lok Sabha elections from Khed in 1962 and 1967. In 1971, he won 5th Lok Sabha elections from Baramati, and became Union Minister for Labour.

On 13 August 1936, Khadilkar married Dr. Smt. Chapala R. Khadilkar, a noted gynecologist from Pune. He died in 1979, and was survived by four daughters.
