= Kisanrao Bankhele =

Indian politician

Kisanrao Bankhele was a member of the 9th Lok Sabha of India. He represented the Khed constituency of Maharashtra and was a member of the Janata Dal political party. Bankhele was a member of the Maharashtra Legislative Assembly from the Ambegaon in Pune district.
