= Ahmedpur Assembly constituency =

Constituency of the Maharashtra legislative assembly in India

Coordinates: 18°42′18.12″N 76°55′53.55″E

Ahmedpur
- Constituency No. 236 for the Maharashtra Legislative Assembly

Constituency details
- Country: India
- Region: Western India
- State: Maharashtra
- Division: Aurangabad
- District: Latur
- Lok Sabha constituency: Latur Lok Sabha constituency
- Established: 1951
- Total electors: 349,572
- Reservation: None

Member of Legislative Assembly
- 15th Maharashtra Legislative Assembly
- Incumbent Babasaheb Mohanrao Jadhav Patil
- Party: NCP
- Alliance: NDA
- Elected year: 2024

Ahmedpur Assembly constituency is a constituency of the Maharashtra Legislative Assembly, in Maharashtra, India. It is in Latur district and is a part of Latur Lok Sabha constituency.

== Members of the Legislative Assembly ==
Election	Member	Party
1952	Nivarthireddy Namdeo Reddy	Indian National Congress
1957	Pawar Vasant Gangaram	Indian National Congress
1957	Tulsiram Dashrath Kamble	Indian National Congress
1962	Mahalingappa Alias Appasaheb Baslingappa	Indian National Congress
1967	Mahalingappa Alias Appasaheb Baslingappa	Indian National Congress
1972	Kishanrao Nanasaheb Deshmukh	Peasants and Workers Party of India
1978	Kishanrao Nanasaheb Deshmukh	Peasants and Workers Party of India
1980	Kishanrao Nanasaheb Deshmukh	Peasants and Workers Party of India
1985	Ramchandrarao Shankarrao Patil	Indian National Congress
1990	Balasaheb Kishanrao Jadhav	Indian National Congress
1995	Bhagwanrao Kerbaji Nagargoje	Bharatiya Janata Party
1999	Vinayakrao Kishanrao Jadhav Patil	Independent politician
2004	Babruwan Ramkrishna Khandade	Bharatiya Janata Party
2009	Babasaheb Mohanrao Patil	Rashtriya Samaj Paksha
2014	Vinayakrao Kishanrao Jadhav Patil	Independent politician
2019	Babasaheb Mohanrao Patil	Nationalist Congress Party
2024	Babasaheb Mohanrao Patil	Nationalist Congress Party

== Election results ==
=== Assembly Election 2024 ===
2024 Maharashtra Legislative Assembly election : Ahmedpur
Party	Candidate	Votes	%	±%
NCP	Babasaheb Mohanrao Patil	96,905	40.23%	New
NCP-SP	Vinayakrao Kishanrao Jadhav Patil	65,236	27.08%	New
JSS	Ganesh Namdevrao Hake	62,447	25.92%	New
Rashtriya Maratha Party	Jadhav Vinayak Sonba	3,917	1.63%	New
Independent	Balaji Ramchandra Patil Chakurkar	3,019	1.25%	New
Independent	Madhav Rangnath Jadhav	2,597	1.08%	New
NOTA	None of the above	834	0.35%	▼0.48
Margin of victory		31,669	13.15%	▼0.54
Turnout		241,740	69.15%	▲2.19
Total valid votes		240,906		
Registered electors		349,572		▲8.79
Nationalist Congress Party (post–2023) gain from NCP		Swing	▲0.54	

=== Assembly Election 2019 ===
2019 Maharashtra Legislative Assembly election : Ahmedpur
Party	Candidate	Votes	%	±%
NCP	Babasaheb Mohanrao Patil	84,636	39.69%	▲11.21
BJP	Vinayakrao Kishanrao Jadhav Patil	55,445	26.00%	▼0.50
Independent	Dilip Rajesaheb Deshmukh	45,846	21.50%	New
VBA	Ayodhya Ashok Kendre	22,141	10.38%	New
AIMIM	Taher Husen Mainoddin Sayyed	1,996	0.94%	New
NOTA	None of the above	1,762	0.83%	▲0.50
Margin of victory		29,191	13.69%	▲11.72
Turnout		215,166	66.96%	▼3.38
Total valid votes		213,219		
Registered electors		321,329		▲10.67
NCP gain from Independent		Swing	▲9.24	

=== Assembly Election 2014 ===
2014 Maharashtra Legislative Assembly election : Ahmedpur
Party	Candidate	Votes	%	±%
Independent	Vinayakrao Kishanrao Jadhav Patil	61,957	30.45%	New
NCP	Babasaheb Mohanrao Patil	57,951	28.48%	New
BJP	Ganesh Namdevrao Hake	53,919	26.50%	▲8.98
INC	Vitthal Namdev Makne	11,404	5.60%	▼30.51
BSP	Sayyad Sajid Kabir	9,409	4.62%	▲3.81
BBM	Adv. Kolgave Madhav Nivrutti	2,672	1.31%	New
Independent	Patil Jyotiram Alias Gunvant Janakraj	1,515	0.74%	New
NOTA	None of the above	681	0.33%	New
Margin of victory		4,006	1.97%	▲0.76
Turnout		204,227	70.34%	▲0.33
Total valid votes		203,466		
Registered electors		290,360		▲9.16
Independent gain from RSPS		Swing	▼6.87	

=== Assembly Election 2009 ===
2009 Maharashtra Legislative Assembly election : Ahmedpur
Party	Candidate	Votes	%	±%
RSPS	Babasaheb Mohanrao Patil	69,460	37.32%	New
INC	Vinayakrao Kishanrao Jadhav Patil	67,208	36.11%	▲6.17
BJP	Babruwan Ramkrishna Khandade	32,617	17.52%	▼15.63
JSS	Shaikh Ayyaj Ejaz	6,764	3.63%	New
MNS	Utge Mahesh Baburao	3,324	1.79%	New
BSP	Bhaskarrao Narayanrao Lahane	1,501	0.81%	▼0.89
Margin of victory		2,252	1.21%	▼2.00
Turnout		186,218	70.01%	▼4.62
Total valid votes		186,119		
Registered electors		265,997		▲35.90
RSPS gain from BJP		Swing	▲4.17	

=== Assembly Election 2004 ===
2004 Maharashtra Legislative Assembly election : Ahmedpur
Party	Candidate	Votes	%	±%
BJP	Babruwan Ramkrishna Khandade	48,406	33.15%	▲1.03
INC	Vinayakrao Kishanrao Jadhav Patil	43,720	29.94%	New
Independent	Balasaheb Kishanrao Jadhav Patil	35,812	24.52%	New
Independent	Sudhakar Bhagwanrao Nagargoje	7,462	5.11%	New
BSP	Bhaskarrao Narayanrao Lahane	2,489	1.70%	New
Independent	Surnar Navanath Govindrao	2,468	1.69%	New
Kranti Kari Jai Hind Sena	Balaji Ramchandra Patil	1,961	1.34%	New
Independent	Ashok Pandharinath Mundhe	929	0.64%	New
Margin of victory		4,686	3.21%	▼2.60
Turnout		146,064	74.63%	▲1.49
Total valid votes		146,024		
Registered electors		195,729		▲23.55
BJP gain from Independent		Swing	▼4.78	

=== Assembly Election 1999 ===
1999 Maharashtra Legislative Assembly election : Ahmedpur
Party	Candidate	Votes	%	±%
Independent	Vinayakrao Kishanrao Jadhav Patil	40,576	37.93%	New
BJP	Bhagwanrao Kerbaji Nagargoje	34,361	32.12%	▼18.77
Independent	Babruwan Ramkrishna Khandade	22,968	21.47%	New
SP	Kishanrao Nanasaheb Deshmukh	3,616	3.38%	New
Independent	Nagargoje Aambaji Ranba	2,697	2.52%	New
PWPI	Mundhe Dnyanoba Sitaram	1,973	1.84%	New
Margin of victory		6,215	5.81%	▼10.49
Turnout		115,869	73.14%	▼11.76
Total valid votes		106,976		
Registered electors		158,415		▲10.66
Independent gain from BJP		Swing	▼12.96	

=== Assembly Election 1995 ===
1995 Maharashtra Legislative Assembly election : Ahmedpur
Party	Candidate	Votes	%	±%
BJP	Bhagwanrao Kerbaji Nagargoje	60,622	50.89%	New
INC	Balasaheb Kishanrao Jadhav Patil	41,200	34.58%	▼5.58
JD	Bhandari Ramkishan Pandurang	6,187	5.19%	New
BBM	Karle Venkatrao Malaba	3,883	3.26%	New
Independent	Wange Laxman Madhavrao	1,937	1.63%	New
Independent	Mugaonkar Gulamrasul Maheboobsab	1,458	1.22%	New
RPI	Shrungare Vijaykumar Shripatrao	1,037	0.87%	New
BSP	Indrale Rajendra Ramchandra	983	0.83%	New
Margin of victory		19,422	16.30%	▼0.33
Turnout		121,531	84.90%	▲21.63
Total valid votes		119,128		
Registered electors		143,154		▼4.75
BJP gain from INC		Swing	▲10.73	

=== Assembly Election 1990 ===
1990 Maharashtra Legislative Assembly election : Ahmedpur
Party	Candidate	Votes	%	±%
INC	Balasaheb Kishanrao Jadhav Patil	37,492	40.16%	▼6.59
Independent	Bhagwanrao Kerbaji Nagargoje	21,970	23.53%	New
SS	Madhukarrao Gangaram Mundhe	20,879	22.36%	New
PWPI	Krishnarao Sahebrao Deshmukh	11,680	12.51%	▼31.15
Margin of victory		15,522	16.63%	▲13.55
Turnout		95,096	63.27%	▲4.72
Total valid votes		93,362		
Registered electors		150,297		▲20.13
INC hold		Swing	▼6.59	

=== Assembly Election 1985 ===
1985 Maharashtra Legislative Assembly election : Ahmedpur
Party	Candidate	Votes	%	±%
INC	Patil Ramchandrarao Shankarrao	33,690	46.75%	New
PWPI	Kishanrao Nanasaheb Deshmukh	31,469	43.66%	▼6.52
Independent	Kendre Hari Rajaram	4,162	5.77%	New
Independent	Kamble Dattu Namdeo	1,767	2.45%	New
Independent	Lohare Nagnath Sangram	517	0.72%	New
Margin of victory		2,221	3.08%	▼0.73
Turnout		73,254	58.55%	▼4.31
Total valid votes		72,071		
Registered electors		125,113		▲13.02
INC gain from PWPI		Swing	▼3.43	

=== Assembly Election 1980 ===
1980 Maharashtra Legislative Assembly election : Ahmedpur
Party	Candidate	Votes	%	±%
PWPI	Kishanrao Nanasaheb Deshmukh	34,183	50.18%	▲4.03
INC(I)	Dudile Vithalrao Tukaram	31,589	46.37%	▲45.19
INC(U)	Deshmukh Shivajirao Kashirao	2,347	3.45%	New
Margin of victory		2,594	3.81%	▼0.46
Turnout		69,590	62.86%	▼2.35
Total valid votes		68,119		
Registered electors		110,701		▲10.73
PWPI hold		Swing	▲4.03	

=== Assembly Election 1978 ===
1978 Maharashtra Legislative Assembly election : Ahmedpur
Party	Candidate	Votes	%	±%
PWPI	Kishanrao Nanasaheb Deshmukh	29,325	46.15%	▼4.25
INC	Nagargoje Bhagwanrao Kerbaji	26,612	41.88%	▼5.80
CPI	Page Kishan Manik	3,216	5.06%	New
RPI(K)	Gulve Ambadas Hariba	2,775	4.37%	New
INC(I)	Aradwad Govindrao Sadashiva	748	1.18%	New
Independent	Shaikh Gulam Rasool Mahboob Sab	705	1.11%	New
Margin of victory		2,713	4.27%	▲1.55
Turnout		65,193	65.21%	▲7.76
Total valid votes		63,537		
Registered electors		99,972		▼1.99
PWPI hold		Swing	▼4.25	

=== Assembly Election 1972 ===
1972 Maharashtra Legislative Assembly election : Ahmedpur
Party	Candidate	Votes	%	±%
PWPI	Kishanrao Nanasaheb Deshmukh	28,742	50.40%	▲7.54
INC	Raddy Sushilabhai Madhav	27,192	47.68%	▲3.62
RPI	Vithathal Sonkambale	1,091	1.91%	New
Margin of victory		1,550	2.72%	▲1.52
Turnout		58,598	57.45%	▲3.14
Total valid votes		57,025		
Registered electors		101,999		▲14.47
PWPI gain from INC		Swing	▲6.34	

=== Assembly Election 1967 ===
1967 Maharashtra Legislative Assembly election : Ahmedpur
Party	Candidate	Votes	%	±%
INC	Mahalingappa Alias Appasaheb Baslingappa	19,605	44.06%	▼14.65
PWPI	Kishanrao Nanasaheb Deshmukh	19,073	42.86%	New
Independent	P. S. Sasone	3,174	7.13%	New
Independent	V. R. Shikane	1,411	3.17%	New
ABJS	R. B. Putdhesni	1,234	2.77%	New
Margin of victory		532	1.20%	▼16.22
Turnout		48,396	54.31%	▼0.74
Total valid votes		44,497		
Registered electors		89,109		▲8.34
INC hold		Swing	▼14.65	

=== Assembly Election 1962 ===
1962 Maharashtra Legislative Assembly election : Ahmedpur
Party	Candidate	Votes	%	±%
INC	Mahalingappa Alias Appasaheb Baslingappa	25,068	58.71%	▼2.19
CPI	Vithalrao Balkrishnarao	17,631	41.29%	New
Margin of victory		7,437	17.42%	▲7.32
Turnout		45,281	55.05%	▼29.22
Total valid votes		42,699		
Registered electors		82,250		▼34.22
INC hold		Swing	▲27.62	

=== Assembly Election 1957 ===
1957 Bombay State Legislative Assembly election : Ahmedpur
Party	Candidate	Votes	%	±%
INC	Pawar Vasant Gangaram	32,753	31.09%	▼26.46
INC	Tulsiram Dashrath Kamble	31,415	29.82%	▼27.73
PSP	Kabra Vijendra Hiralal	22,106	20.98%	New
Independent	Kamble Kishan Sakharam	19,090	18.12%	New
Margin of victory		10,647	10.10%	▼11.46
Turnout		105,364	84.27%	▲32.68
Total valid votes		105,364		
Registered electors		125,030		▲188.47
INC hold		Swing	▼26.46	

=== Assembly Election 1952 ===
1952 Hyderabad State Legislative Assembly election : Ahmedpur
Party	Candidate	Votes	%	±%
INC	Nivarthireddy Namdeo Reddy	12,868	57.55%	New
PDF	Manikrao Kishanrao	8,047	35.99%	New
Socialist	Bhagwandas Kanhyalal	1,445	6.46%	New
Margin of victory		4,821	21.56%	
Turnout		22,360	51.59%	
Total valid votes		22,360		
Registered electors		43,342		
INC win (new seat)				
