= Pune Metropolitan Region Development Authority =

Indian government agency

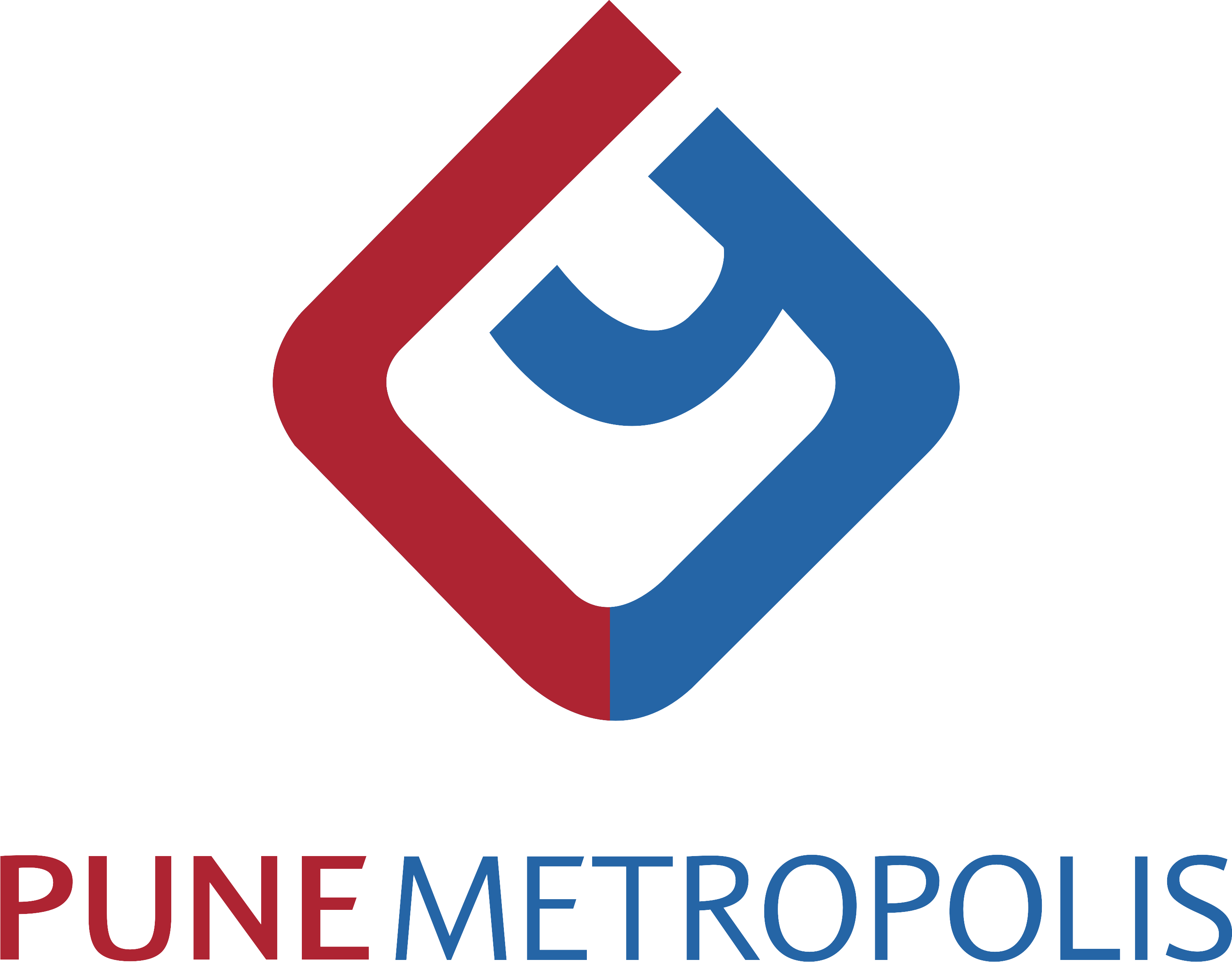

Agency overview
- Formed: 31 March 2015; 11 years ago
- Type: Urban Planning Agency
- Jurisdiction: Pune Metropolitan Region
- Headquarters: Aundh, Pune
- Minister responsible: Devendra Fadnavis, Chief Minister
- Agency executive: Dr. Yeogesh Mhase IAS, Metropolitan Commissioner
- Website: http://www.pmrda.gov.in

Pune Metropolitan Region Development Authority is the planning and development authority for the Pune Metropolitan Region. It was notified in the year 2015 and has a jurisdictional area of 7,246.46 km^{2} (2,797.87 sq mi) with a population of 7.276 million (approximately), it is the 2nd largest urban unit in Maharashtra.

The authority covers the entire talukas of Pune, Pimpri-Chinchwad, Maval, Mulshi, Haveli and parts of Bhor, Daund, Shirur, Chakan, Purandar and Velhe. It has been set up as a legally empowered and self-financing corporate body by the Urban Development Department of the Government of Maharashtra.

== See also ==
- Mumbai Metropolitan Region Development Authority
- Nagpur Metropolitan Region Development Authority
- Nashik Metropolitan Region Development Authority
