= List of talukas in Pune district =

District in state of Maharashtra in India

Location of Pune district in Maharashtra in India

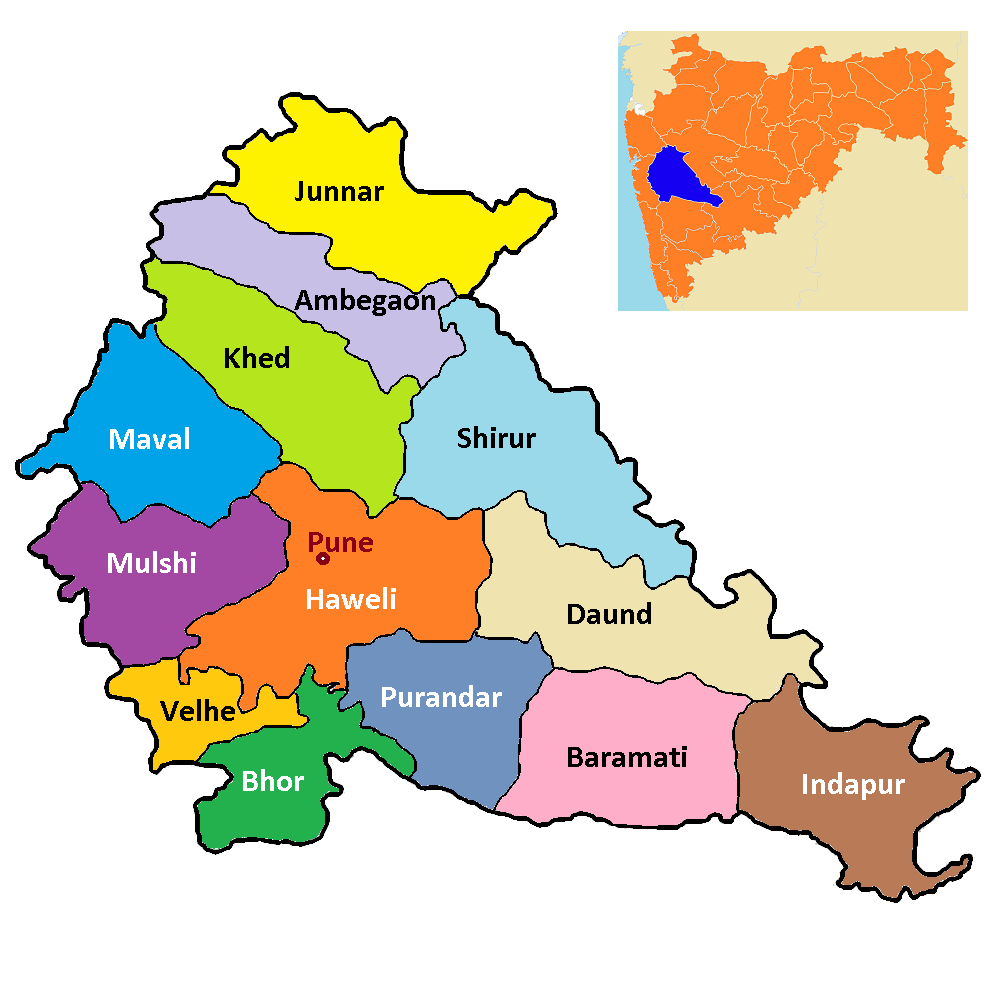
Location of talukas of Pune district in Maharashtra

Pune district is a district in state of Maharashtra in India. There are 15 talukas (talukas) in Pune district (including 2 city talukas). The 15 talukas are divided into following 5 district subdivisions.

== District Subdivisions ==
=== Bhor ===
- Bhor taluka
- Purandar taluka
- Velhe taluka

=== Pune ===
- Haveli taluka
- Pune City taluka

=== Shirur ===
- Khed Taluka
- Ambegaon taluka
- Shirur taluka
- Junnar taluka

=== Maval ===
- Maval taluka
- Mulshi taluka

== List of talukas in Pune district by area ==
The Table below list 14 of the 15 talukas of Pune district (the exception being Pimpri-Chinchwad City taluka) in the Indian state of Maharashtra, along with district subdivision and location map in the district information.

Districts Subdivision	Location on District Map	
Ambegaon	Khed	ambeogan junnar khed
Baramati	Baramati	
Bhor	Bhor	
Daund	Baramati	
Haveli	Haveli	
Indapur	Baramati	
Junnar	Junnar	
Khed	Khed	
Maval	Maval	
Mulshi	Maval	
Pune City	Haveli	
Purandar	Bhor	
Shirur	Khed	
Velhe	Bhor	

== See also ==
- Pune district
- Talukas in Ahmednagar district
