= Jedhe Karina =

Book by Jedhe

- The starting page of The Jedhe Karina
- Author: Jedhes
- Language: Modi / Marathi
- Subject: History
- Publication place: India

Jedhe Karina or Jedhe Statement is a record of family events of Jedhe Deshmukh of village Kari located near Bhor in modern Pune district. It covers a period of about 65 years starting from 1626 and ending to 1689. While main objective of the Karina is to state how the family of Jedhes went on prospering day by day, it also throws light on the formative period of Maratha Empire.

== Background ==
The Jedhes, the Khopades, the Bandals and the Naik-Nimbalkars were the prominent Deshmukhs of Maval. Out of these, Jedhes of Kaari, in present day Bhor, were the Deshmukhs of 'Rohid Khora', which includes the forts of Raireshwar and Rohideshwar in the Maval region of the modern Pune district, which is near Bhor about 48 km towards south of Pune. Being the leaders of their region, they were privileged persons and enjoyed a high status in political, social and economic life of the region. Kanhoji Jedhe is regarded as the real founder of the Jedhe family as he and his son Baji, popularly known as Sarjerao Jedhe, brought their family to prominence by rendering valuable services to Shivaji, the founder of Maratha Empire in the 17th century. Jedhe Shakawali (chronology) and Jedhe Karina (statement) are their family records which is now regarded as the genuine evidence for many historical events.

== Contents ==
Jedhe Karina consists of an account the progress of Jedhe family starting from the death of Malik Ambar in 1626 and ending with Sambhaji’s capture in 1689. Wherever the year of an event is mentioned, it is given in terms ‘Shaliwahan Shaka’ era which is roughly 78 years behind of the Julian calendar year.

== Select Events ==
- This Karina is of Jedhe Deshmukh, Taluka Bhor, Fort Rohida, to the following effect :-

When the partition between our ancestors and the Khopade Deshmukhs was made by the judges and the family jurors, the Bhor region came to the share of the Jedhes and the Utroli region was assigned to the Khopades.

- Thereupon the Jedhes managed the cultivation and revenue collection of the Bhor region and undertook great trouble for the sake of the forts, by the order of the Nizam Shah. They collected troops, conducted campaigns and fought battles at great risk.
- They also managed the governmental work so well, that the Nizam Shah was highly pleased and gave village Kari as Inam to our ancestor Naikji Naik.
- His son Kanhoji Naik Jedhe, by the strength of his sword and of his troops, bravely resisted Chandrarao More and Krishnaji Naik Bandal, who used to levy forced contributions upon the twelve Mavals.
- By order of Malik Ambar, Kanhoji forcibly captured fort Kelanja (Mohangad) with the aid of rope ladders.
- Malik Ambar died in the month of Vaishakh of Shaka 1578 (May 1626) Sometime thereafter this territory went to the share of Adil Shah.
- In the month of Bhadrapada of Shaka 1554 (September 1632) Shahaji brought out a new Nizamshahi Prince and crowned him at Pemgiri near Ahmednagar.
- Soon (in 1635) Shahaji carried the Prince to fort Mahuli which was besieged by Ranadullakhan and Kanhoji on behalf of Adil Shah. Ranadullakhan secretly carried out negotiations with Shahaji for surrender. Peace was made with the help of Kanhoji.
- Kanhoji’s services were transferred from Ranadullakhan to Shahaji on his request to Adil Shah.
- Shahaji sent Shivaji to Pune with Shamrajpant Peshwe, Mankoji Dahatonde, Balaji Hari Majalasi together with clerks and a body of cavalry. Houses were built for Shivaji and others and fort Kondana (Sinhagad) was captured.
- Adil Shah heard of this and got very angry. He put Shahaji, Kanhoji and Dadaji Krishna in jail.
- Kondana was given back to Adil Shah and peace was made.
- Upon release, Shahaji sent Kanhoji to Shivaji saying ‘People of Maval respect you highly. I intend to send you to help Shivaji. Be loyal to him.’ Thereupon Kanhoji took the oath.
