= Bhai Vaidya =

Indian politician (1928–2018)

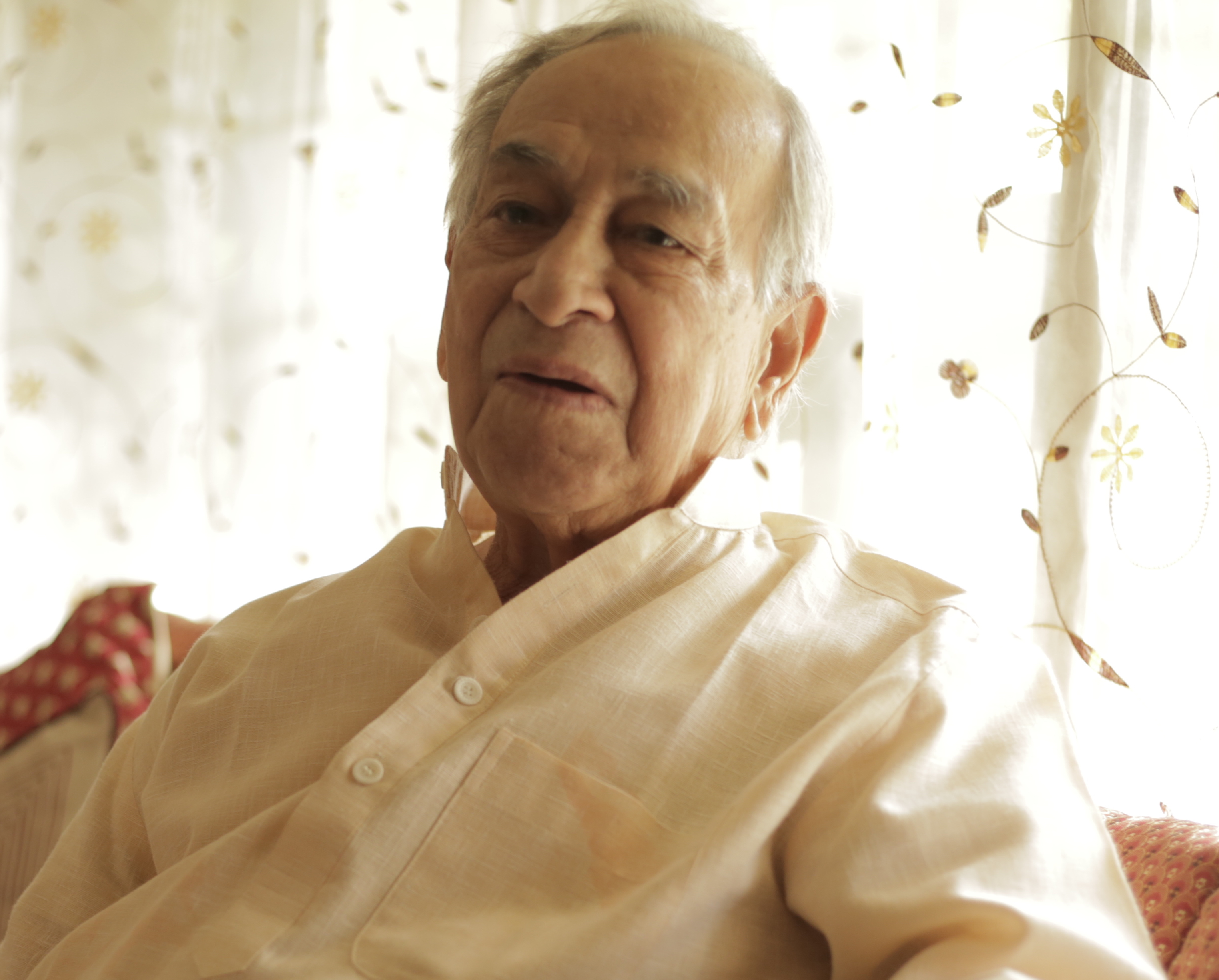

Mayor of Pune
- In office 1974 – 1975
- Preceded by: Bhausaheb Sonba Anaji Chavan
- Succeeded by: Hambirrao Moze

Member of Maharashtra Legislative Assembly
- In office 1978–1980
- Preceded by: Tikamdas Memjade
- Succeeded by: Amminuddin Penwale
- Constituency: Bhavani Peth

Minister of State Government of Maharashtra
- In office 18 July 1978 – 18 February 1980
- Minister: Ministry of Home Affairs Government of Maharashtra
- Succeeded by: P. V. Nayak

Personal details
- Born: Bhalchandra Vaidya; 22 June 1928 Dapode, Velhe Tehsil, Pune District
- Died: 2 April 2018 (aged 89) Pune, Maharashtra
- Party: Socialist Party (India) (2011-2018)
- Other political affiliations: Rashtra Seva Dal (1943-1946; Congress Socialist Party (1946-1948; Socialist Party (1948-1952); Praja Socialist Party (1952-1955); Socialist Party (1955-1964); Samyukta Socialist Party (1964-1971); Socialist Party (1971-1977); Janata Party (1977-1988); Janata Dal (1988-1990); Janata Dal (Socialist) (1990-1993); Socialist Front (1993-1995); Samajwadi Jan Parishad (1995-2011)
- Children: Abhijit & Prachi
- Occupation: Revolutionary, politician

Bhalchandra Sadashiv Vaidya (22 June 1928 – 2 April 2018), also known as Bhai Vaidya, was an Indian politician who served as the Home Minister of the Indian state of Maharashtra, a revolutionary, Member Maharashtra Legislative Assembly, Mayor of Pune, veteran Socialist leader and head of the Socialist Party of India.

== Brief biography ==
Bhai was born on 22 June 1928 at Dapode village in Velhe taluka, Poona District in a Marathi Chandraseniya Kayastha Prabhu (popularly known as CKP) family. He began his activism journey at the age of 14 as an Indian revolutionary. In his political career which spanned over 60 years, he was elected multiple times to the Municipal Corporation and later became the Mayor of Pune city during 1974–75. He was the first president of All India Mayor Association. He was elected to the Maharashtra Legislative Assembly and later became the Home Minister of Maharashtra State in 1978.

He is well known for many reformative decisions during his Home Ministry, especially changing the police uniforms from half pants to full pants and refusing huge bribes from smugglers with his honest and uncompromising attitude. Bhai was at the forefront of the Samyukta Maharashtra Samiti movement with his mentor Shreedhar Mahadev Joshi and other influential leaders of the time.

Bhai was a vocal opponent of emergency even during his Mayorship, when he organised a rally of 20,000 people at Shaniwar Wada and got arrested. As a revolutionary and a lifelong activist who fought for the rights of Dalits, farmers and backward classes, Bhai was jailed 28 times.

== Career ==
He served as Home minister of state of Maharashtra, Mayor of Pune City, President of Socialist Party, President of Rashtra Seva Dal, National Secretary of Janata Party, National Chief of Samajwadi Jana Parishad, President of Bharat Yatra Trust, Delhi, President of S.M Joshi Medical Trust Pune, Pune Municipal Retirement Service home from 1995.

== Death ==
Vaidya died from pancreatic cancer on 2 April 2018 at the age of 89. For the last 10 years of his life he fought for free health and education. He is known as a politician and a fierce leader/activist who never compromised on his values during his career.

Chief minister Devendra Fadnavis said, “We have lost a person who believed in and lived for the democratic values all his life. He fought for the poor relentlessly. His contribution to the freedom movement and the Goa freedom movement is of immense importance. Vaidya’s dossiers on value and morale based politics are emblems. This is a big loss for the state.”

Prakash Javadekar, Union human resource development minister, recounted his recent meeting with Vaidya on Padwa. “He had come to meet me, to request that President should be invited for the inauguration of Ramabai Ambedkar’s statue. He was happy to know that the President was positive about the event,” he said, adding that Vaidya would always remember number by heart and would recount them in minutes when others struggled with directories.
