= Battle of Pratapgarh =

1659 battle between the Marathas and the Bijapur Sultanate

Battle of Pratapgad
- Part of The Maratha rebellion
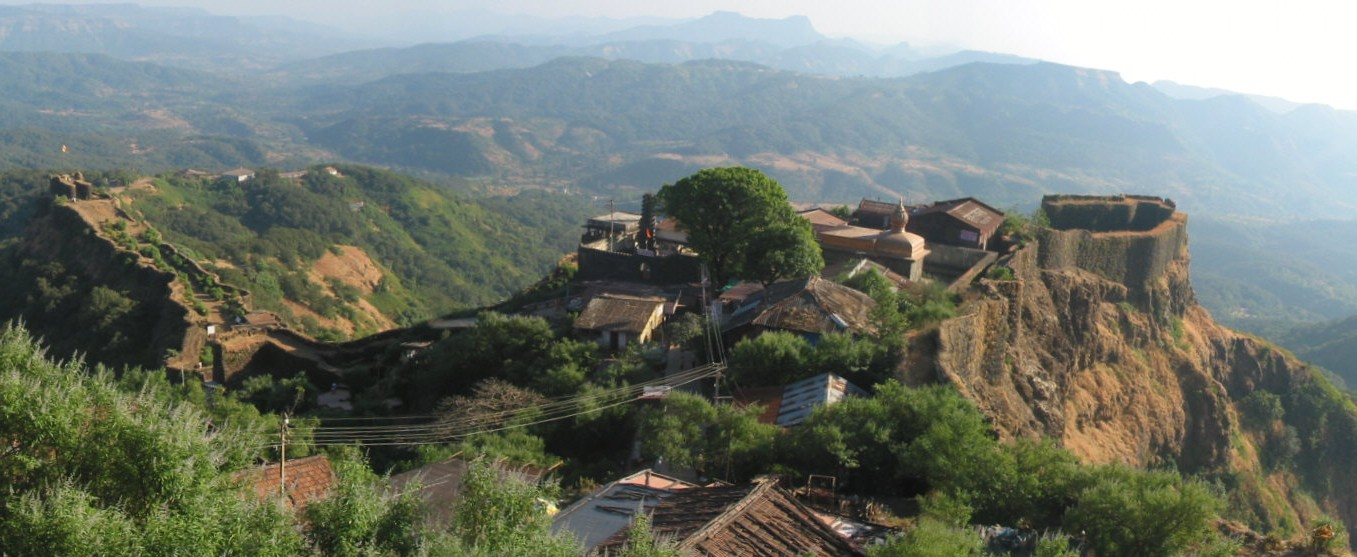
- The fort of [Pratapgad]
Date	10 November 1659
Location	Pratapgad, now in Satara district near Pune, Maharashtra, India
Result	Maratha victory

Belligerents
Bijapur Sultanate	Maratha Kingdom

Commanders and leaders
Afzal Khan X Bada Sayyid †; Fazal Khan (WIA); Rustam Zaman (WIA); Krishnaji Bhaskar †; Abdul Sayyid †; Rahim Khan †; Pahlawan Khan †; Randaula Khan (POW); Ambar Khan (POW); Rajaji Ghatge (POW); Musa Khan Pathan; Hasan Khan; Yaqut Khan; Ankush Khan; Mambaji Bhonsle †	'Shivaji; Kanhoji Jedhe; Tanaji Malusare; Netaji Palkar; Moropant Pingale; Yesaji Kank

Strength
12,000 cavalry 10,000 infantry 1,500 musketeers 85 elephants 1,200 camels 80–90 cannon artillery 5,000 reserves at Wai	6,000 cavalry under Netaji Palkar; 3,000 infantry under Moropant Pingle; 4,000 infantry under Kanhoji Jedhe

Casualties and losses
5,000 killed 5,000 wounded 3,000 imprisoned artillery destroyed or captured	2191 killed 420 wounded

The Battle of Pratapgad took place on 10 November 1659, at Pratapgad in Satara. The battle was fought between the Maratha forces led by Shivaji Maharaj and the Bijapur troops under General Afzal Khan. The Maratha emerged victorious, marking their first significant military triumph against a major regional power. In the aftermath of this victory Shivaji captured 65 elephants, 4,000 horses, 1,200 camels and 1,000,000 rupees of cash and jewellery.

== Appointment of Afzal Khan against Shivaji ==
In response to Shivaji's incursions and fort captures in the Konkan region, Ali Adil Shah II, ruler of the Sultanate of Bijapur, appointed Afzal Khan with 10,000 horsemen to confront him. The official history of Ali Adil shah's reign, the Tarikh-e-Ali, suggests that Ali Adilshah ordered Afzal Khan to eliminate Shivaji, viewing him as a threat to Islam. Although some sources suggest that the intention was to capture Shivaji alive, the Tarikh-e-Ali remains the most reliable account. Despite initial reluctance from other generals, Afzal Khan volunteered for the mission, demonstrating his confidence in subduing Shivaji. The force dispatched under Afzal Khan's command numbered around 10,000 cavalry, as documented in the Tarikh-e-Ali. Notable noblemen and soldiers, including Ambar Khan, Yakut Khan, and Musa Khan, were assigned to serve under Afzal Khan's leadership. This appointment marked a significant escalation in the conflict between Shivaji and the Sultanate of Bijapur.

== Afzal Khan's arrival at Wai ==
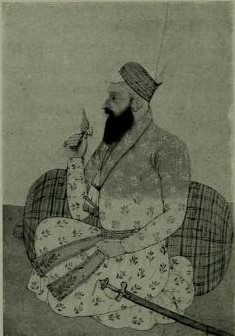
Afzal Khan of Bijapur

Afzal Khan departed from Bijapur around May 1659 on a campaign against Shivaji. While enroute to Wai, conflicting accounts suggest that he desecrated the idol of Bhavani at Tuljapur and the idol of Vithoba at Pandharpur. These acts of vandalism aimed to humiliate Shivaji, as documented by various sources, including the Sabhasad Chronicle and the Shivakavya.

Although the exact reasons for Afzal Khan's journey to Wai remain unclear, the Shivabharat suggests that it was prompted by Prataprao's betrayal of Shivaji's stronghold, Jawali, to the Sultanate of Bijapur. Afzal Khan viewed capturing Jawali as a strategic move to gain control over the Wai region, the Sahyadri mountains, and the coastal areas. Additionally, Afzal Khan's possession of the Wai Pargana since 1649 likely influenced his decision to use Wai as a base for his operations against Shivaji. Afzal Khan's arrival at Wai marked a significant development in the ongoing conflict between Shivaji and the Sultanate of Bijapur, leading to a pivotal confrontation between the two adversaries.

== Initial actions ==
Upon Afzal Khan's departure for Wai, Ali Adilshah issued farmans (royal decrees) to the deshmukhs (local rulers) in the Maval region, instructing them to join Afzal Khan's campaign against Shivaji. These farmans aimed to gather support for Afzal Khan's mission to confront Shivaji's incursions in the region.

One such farman issued to Kanhoji Jedhe, a deshmukh in the Maval region, emphasized the importance of obedience to Afzal Khan's authority and the eradication of Shivaji's forces. Failure to comply with Afzal Khan's orders would result in severe consequences, as stated in the farman. In response to receiving the farman, Kanhoji Jedhe, along with his sons, sought counsel from Shivaji at Rajgad. Despite the potential jeopardy to his watan (land and property), Kanhoji remained steadfast in his allegiance to Shivaji, renouncing his watan and pledging his loyalty to the Maratha leader.

Meanwhile, Shivaji mobilized his forces, ordering his cavalry commander Netaji Palkar to lay waste to enemy territory while he himself led his infantry to Jawali. Shivaji's strategic manoeuvres and alliances with local leaders demonstrated his readiness to confront the advancing Adilshah forces. On 12 July 1659, Shivaji arrived in Jawali, marking a significant development in the ongoing conflict between Shivaji and the Sultanate of Bijapur. These preliminary moves set the stage for a pivotal confrontation between Shivaji and Afzal Khan's forces at Wai.

== Incursions into each other's territories ==
During the conflict between Afzal Khan and Shivaji, both sides engaged in incursions into each other's territories. According to the Tarikh-e-Ali, Afzal Khan's forces swiftly entered Shivaji's territory under orders from Ali Adilshah. The account uses metaphorical language to describe the invasion, mentioning the thunderous sounds of drums and the dust kicked up by horses, but lacks detailed information. The Shivabharat provides a clearer picture, stating that while Shivaji prepared to confront Afzal Khan at Jawali, Afzal Khan's commanders launched attacks into Shivaji's provinces. These assaults resulted in Yadav attacking Supe, Pandhare invading Shirwal, Kharade advancing into Saswad, Siddi Hilal targeting Pune, and Saif Khan penetrating Konkan, previously occupied by Shivaji's forces.

Afzal Khan's forces, according to the Shivabharat, inflicted significant damage on Shivaji's territories, reducing them to a distressed state. This assertion aligns with a letter written by Afzal Khan to Terdal Pargana officials on 7 September 1659, confirming Shivaji's army's destructive actions in Adilshah provinces.

== Negotiations ==
In October 1659, Afzal Khan dispatched his envoy Krishna Rao to Pratapgad to meet with Shivaji. Shivaji received Krishna Rao and provided him with robes of honour, indicating willingness to engage in negotiations. Shivaji proposed holding the meeting below the Pratapgad. Meanwhile, Afzal Khan also sent a letter to Shivaji, expressing displeasure over Shivaji's actions and demanding surrender of forts and territories. Shivaji responded with a brief reply, acknowledging Afzal Khan's power and requesting a meeting in Jawali to discuss terms. The envoys exchanged messages, with Shivaji's envoy Pant Gopinath contributing significantly to persuading Afzal Khan to agree to the meeting in Jawali.

Different interpretations of events emerged from sources partial to Afzal Khan and those favouring Shivaji. While some accounts suggest Shivaji sought pardon and invited Afzal Khan for a meeting, others imply Afzal Khan's invasion forced Shivaji to seek reconciliation. Afzal Khan, despite objections from his advisors, decided to proceed to Jawali for the meeting. He left behind part of his army and provisions at Wai and advanced towards Jawali.

Upon learning of Afzal Khan's approach, Shivaji instructed his infantry commanders to conceal themselves near Afzal Khan's camp, prepared to engage if negotiations failed. Shivaji also ordered his commander Netaji Palkar not to initiate hostilities until the outcome of the meeting was clear. Netaji Palkar, returning from incursions into Adilshah territory, received Shivaji's instructions to await further developments while remaining prepared for action.

Ultimately, the stage was set for a crucial meeting between Shivaji and Afzal Khan, where the fate of their conflict would be decided through negotiations or confrontation.

=== Arrival of Afzal Khan at Jawali ===
Afzal Khan successfully navigated the challenging mountain slopes and reached Jawali with his army. Upon learning of Khan's proximity, Shivaji recognized the gravity of the situation, knowing Khan was now within reach. Both Shivaji and Afzal Khan sent envoys to inquire about each other's well-being, signalling a potential for negotiations. However, the true intentions of both leaders remained undisclosed. Shivaji cleverly invited traders accompanying Afzal Khan to the fort, ostensibly to purchase gifts for Khan and his entourage. Unbeknownst to the traders, Shivaji detained them on the mountain top, restricting their movement.

The terms for the meeting between Shivaji and Afzal Khan were finalized through their envoys. It was agreed that Khan would proceed to the meeting place in a palanquin, accompanied by a few servants, while Shivaji would greet him armed, with both parties having armed guards at a distance. The stage was set for a crucial encounter between Shivaji and Afzal Khan, where their intentions and the fate of their conflict would be revealed.

== Killing of Afzal Khan ==
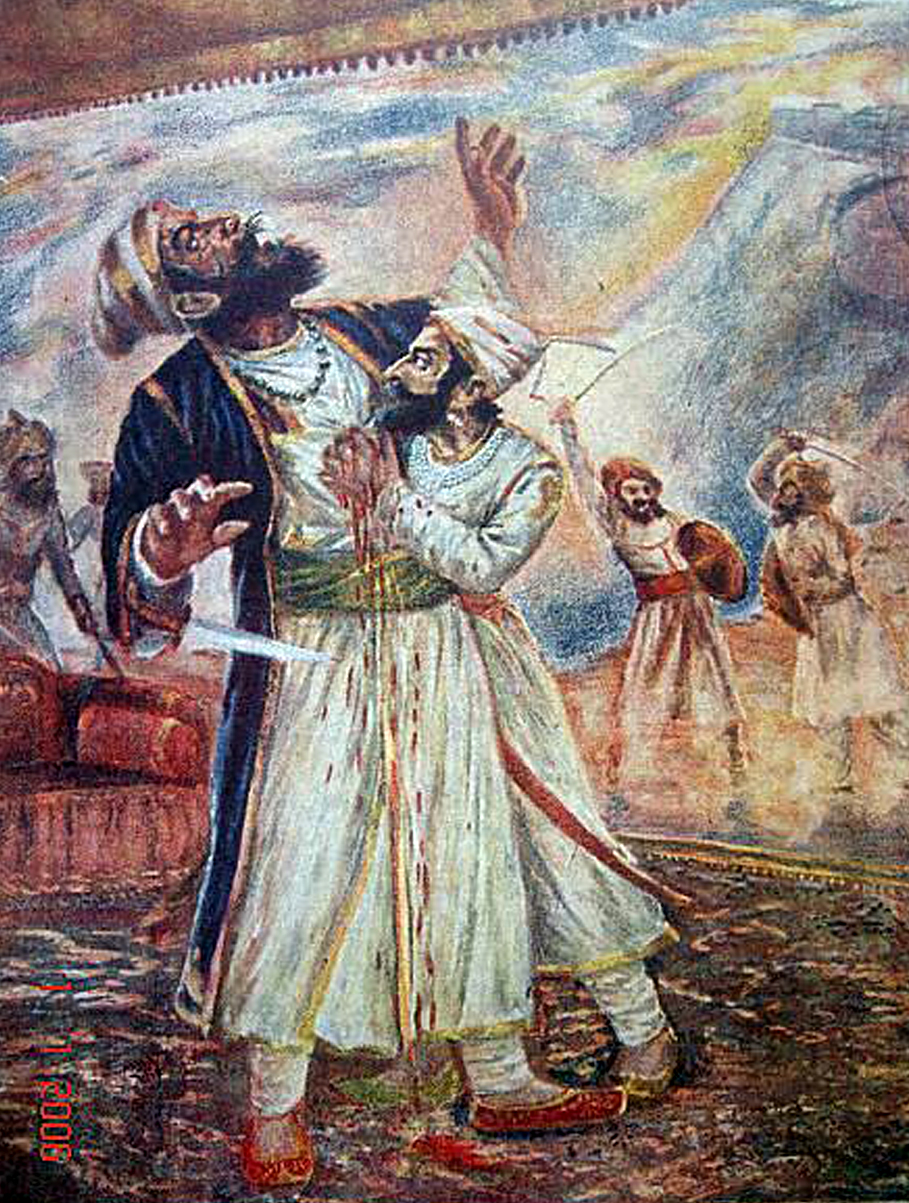
Killing of Afzal Khan

According to the records of the Jedhe Shakawali, it was concurred in a meeting between Shivaji and his generals that Afzal Khan was treacherous.

On 10 November 1659, Shivaji and Afzal Khan met alone with just their envoys and bodyguards near the Pratapgarh. During the embrace between both men, Afzal Khan grabbed Shivaji and tried to stab him in the back with a dagger. This attack failed as Shivaji anticipated this and had worn armour underneath his clothes. Shivaji then went on to use his Bagh Nakh (Tiger Claws) to stab Afzal Khan in the guts, which resulted in the Afzal Khan's death.

== Battle of Jawali ==
Following the demise of Afzal Khan, a signal was given from the Pratapgad. In response to this signal, 10,000 Maratha soldiers hiding in the forests ambushed the Adilshah army at Jawali. An attempted counterattack was also repelled.

The rugged terrain of the mountainous region proved advantageous for infantry but posed challenges for cavalry, resulting in the defeat of the Muslim forces.

— Shivabharat (23:29)

The mountainous terrain favoured the Maratha infantry, rendering the Adilshah cavalry ineffective. As a result, Afzal Khans surviving commanders escaped with the remainder of the army and sought refuge in Wai. Even Mambaji Bhosale who was the brother of Shahaji Bhosale and was fighting to kill Shivaji Maharaj lat that time was shown no mercy. He too was eliminated despite being the uncle of Shivaji Maharaj!! The Marathas won the battle and captured notable figures. However, the Maratha cavalry arrived too late to attack the enemy campsite, as they had fled.

== Aftermath ==
Adilshahi forces lost their artillery, 65 elephants, 4000 horses, 1200 camels, jewels worth 300,000 Rupees, 1,000,000 Rupees, heaps of precious cloths, tents to the Marathas. They also lost their money and grain stored at Wai.

5,000 Adilshahi soldiers were killed and almost as many were wounded. 3,000 soldiers were imprisoned, and the remainder were allowed to go home in defeat. The Marathas lost 1,734 soldiers, while 420 soldiers were wounded.

As it was policy of Shivaji to humanely treat the defeated army, neither the men nor women were sold as slaves or molested. Wounded commanders were offered treatment deserving of their rank and either imprisoned or sent back to Bijapur. Some of the defeated Adilshahi generals like Siddi Hilal changed their loyalties and joined the Marathas to serve under Shivaji Maharaj. Two of Afzal khan’s sons were captured by the Marathas but were let off by the Shivaji Maharaj. Fazal khan (son of Afzal khan) and the Adilshahi soldiers with him who were badly injured were shown a safe passage out of the forest of Jawli by Prataprao More. Shivaji Maharaj also buried Afzal Khan as per Islamic customs and build his tomb near Pratapgarh, as per his philosophy of ‘once the enemy is dead, the enmity is dead too’.

The sword of honour was presented to Kanhoji Jedhe for his invaluable and outstanding performance of service to Shivaji. The relatives of the killed soldiers were offered service in the Maratha army. Families without any male left alive to support the family were awarded pensions. Heroes of the war were rewarded with medals, kada (bracelets) and horses.

Khan's death dealt the Adilshah's rule a severe blow. A quarter of his territory, forts and a fifth of his army were captured or destroyed, while Shivaji doubled his territory, losing a tenth of his army only.

After the successful elimination of Afzal Khan, Shivaji swiftly dispatched Netaji Palkar from Wai and followed suit shortly thereafter. His troops laid siege to the Chandan fort, although the outcome of this siege remains unclear. More Maratha deshmukhs of the Bijapur Sultanate defected to the Marathas.

Expanding his dominion, Shivaji's troops collected tribute from various areas up to Kolhapur, consolidating Maratha control over these regions. A siege was laid on the Panhala Fort. Despite fierce resistance, the Marathas managed to scale the fort and capture it on 28 November 1659. Shivaji personally inspected the fort on 2 December 1659. Around the same period, before 15 February 1660, the Marathas also seized the Vishalgad fort. The Adilshah dispatched General Rustum Zaman to counter Shivaji's advance. His force was intercepted by Shivaji near Kolhapur on 28 December 1659, routing his army in a decisive battle. The spoils included 12 elephants and 2,000 horses, indicating the significant strength of both armies.

Following this victory, Shivaji sent Netaji Palkar to raid deep into Adilshah territory while he personally oversaw the defences of Panhala. Netaji's cavalry conducted plundering raids as far as Dharwad and Gadag to the south, and Tikota to the east, near Bijapur. Simultaneously, Maratha troops were dispatched to the Konkan region, meeting little resistance as they advanced southwards. By 12 January 1660, a detachment of Maratha troops reached Rajapur, followed by the capture of Kharepatan on 15 January and the small fort at Kudal around 15 February.

== Bibliography ==
- Sarkar, Jadunath (1920) [1919]. Shivaji and His Times (2nd ed.). London: Longmans, Green and Co.
- Eaton, Richard Maxwell (8 March 2015). The Sufis of Bijapur, 1300-1700: Social Roles of Sufis in Medieval India. Princeton University Press. ISBN 978-1-4008-6815-5.
- Shivbharat (in Marathi). Bharat Itihas Sanshodhak Mandal, Pune, India.
- Dr. S.D. Samant (1996). Vedh Mahamanavacha (in Marathi). Deshmukh & Co., Pune, India.
- Major Mukund Joshi – Battle of Pratapgarh – a new perspective. 1 January 2005. Snehavardhan Publishing House. ISBN 8172651996, 978-8172651992
- Commandant Kasar, D.B. – Rigveda to Raigarh making of Shivaji the great
