= Jedhe =

Jedhe जेधे
- Country: India
- Current region: Bhor
- Origin: Kari, Bhor, Pune, Maharashtra, India
- Founder: Kanhoji Jedhe
- Seat: Kari
- Titles: Deshmukh
- Members: Kanhoji Jedhe; Baji Jedhe; Keshavrao Jedhe
- Estate: Rohid Khora estate

Jedhe is a Deshmukh sub clan of the Maratha caste in Maharashtra, India.

The village of Kari, in modern Bhor taluka was the capital of the Jedhe Deshmukh.

Moreover, the Jedhe were the pioneer house of Deshmukh among Marathas who supported Shivaji's kingdom and helped the Maratha Empire grow in its early stages.

Jedhe Shakawali (chronology) and Jedhe Karina (statement) are their family records which is now regarded as the genuine evidence for many historical events.

== Notable people ==
- Kanhoji Jedhe, 17th-century Marathi warrior
- Keshavrao Jedhe, political leader also one of the founding member of PWPI
- Gulabrao Jedhe, elected as member of parliament from Baramati, Pune by Indian National Congress

== See also ==
- Maratha
- Maratha Empire
- Maratha clan system
- List of Maratha dynasties and states
- Bhonsle
- Gaekwad
- Scindia
- Puars
- Holkar
- Peshwa
