= Keshavnagar-Mundwa =

Village in Maharashtra, India

Mundhwa Mundhwa
- Village
- Location within Maharashtra Location within India
- Coordinates: 18°31′56″N 73°56′38″E
- Country: India
- State: Maharashtra
- District: Pune
- Taluk: Pune City

Government
  - Type: Sarpanch
- Elevation: 555 m (1,821 ft)

Population (2011)
  - Total: 29,965

Languages
  - Local: Marathi
- Time zone: UTC+5:30 (IST)
- PIN: 411036

Keshavnagar-Mundwa, also known as Mundhwa, is a village in Maharashtra, India. It is located on the outskirts of Pune, about 11 kilometres east of the city centre.

According to the 2011 census of India, there were 29,965 residents within 7537 households of the village. Among the inhabitants, 16,309 were male and 13,656 were female. The overall literacy rate was 75.76%, with 12,704 of the male population and 9,996 of the female population being literate.
