= Kanhoji Jedhe =

17th-century Indian warrior

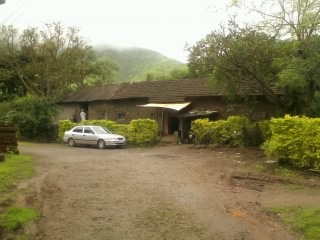
- Modern day images of the residence of Kanhoji Jedhe

General of Maratha Army
- Monarch: Shivaji I

Personal details
- Occupation: Military Commander

Military service
- Allegiance: Maratha Empire
- Service: Maratha Army
- Battles/wars: The Maratha rebellion: Battle of Javali; Battle of Pratapgad; Retreat to Vishalgad

Kanhoji Naik-Jedhe Deshmukh was a 17th-century Marathi Sardar, and a trusted aide of Shahaji, and of Shahaji's son Shivaji Maharaj, who founded the Maratha Empire in 1646.

== Regin ==
Kanhoji Jedhe had his own independent council of ministers, which included the commander Pilaji Gole. Kanhoji owned the entire 'Rohid Khora', which includes the forts of Raireshwar and Rohideshwar, in present-day Bhor taluka, near Pune. The administration was controlled from his native place Kaari. Kanhoji was of the same age of Shahaji. His eldest son Baji 'Sarjerao' Jedhe was two months older than Chhatrapati Shivaji. Shahaji sent Kanhoji along with the young Shivaji to Pune. Because of his high personal standing among the Jamindars, he helped Shivaji in organising most of them under his banner.

His actual testing time came when Afzal Khan, a Sardar sent by Bijapur court, came to attack Chhatrapati Shivaji. Adilshah threatened all the Deshmukhs of the Maval region to support Afzal or else perish. At the behest of Shivaji, Kanhoji convened a meeting of all the Deshmukhs (who had received similar threats from Adilshah) at his 'wadaa' at Kaari. Kanhoji not only stood by Shivaji, but inspired and motivated all the Deshmukhs to fight for Swaraj. He played a pivotal role in planning and executing the battle of Prataapgad which eventually led to the defeat of Afzal Khan's army. After Afzal was defeated soundly at the Battle of Pratapgad, Shivaji honored the loyalty and bravery of Kanhoji by awarding him talwarichya pahilya panache maankari (Sword of Honour).

Kanhoji Jedhe also played a pivotal part in bringing Shivaji back from Agra where he was under house arrest.

== Descendants ==
In the 20th century, the descendants of Kanhoji Jedhe also played a leading role in the establishment of the State of Maharashtra; Samyukta Maharashtra Samiti, founded by Keshavrao Jedhe, led the demand for a Marathi-speaking state. Maharashtra was formed as a direct result of this Samiti; the Hutatma Chowk and Maharashtra Day commemorate the relentless efforts of the Jedhes.

== In popular culture ==
=== Films and television ===
- In the 2022 Marathi-language Indian historical film Pawankhind, he is portrayed by Rajan Bhise.
- In the 2026 Indian Marathi-language historical film Raja Shivaji, he is portrayed by Ashok Samarth.
