= Pune Metropolitan Region =

- Metropolitan region
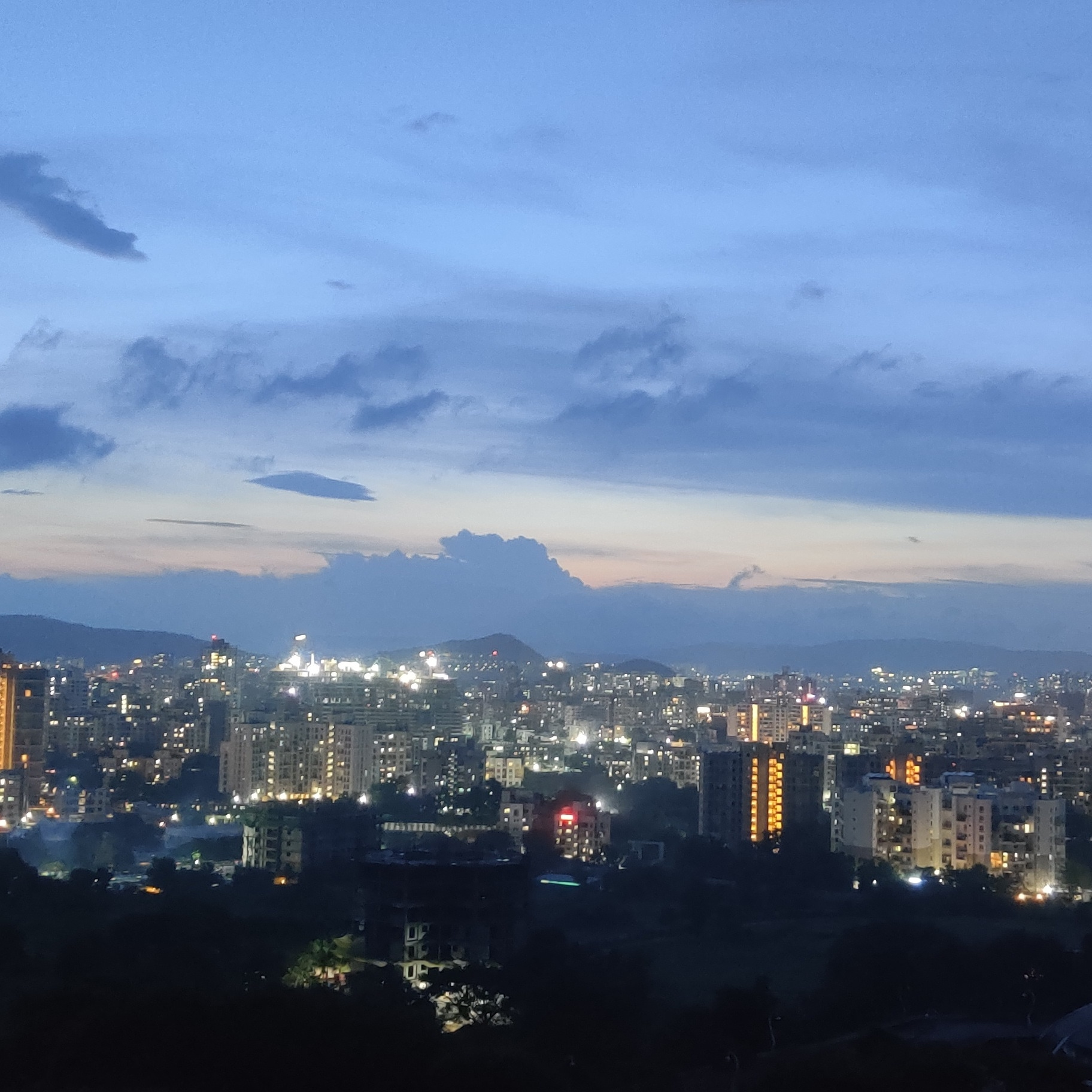
- Pune Skyline
- Interactive map of Pune Metropolitan Region
- Country: India
- State: Maharashtra
- District: Pune
- Talukas: PCMC, PMC

Area
  - Metro: 7,256.46 km^{2} (2,801.73 sq mi)

Population (2011)
  - Metro: 7,541,946
  - Metro density: 1,039.34/km^{2} (2,691.88/sq mi)
- Time zone: UTC+5.30 (IST)
- Development Authority: PMRDA
- Chairman: Devendra Fadnavis, CM
- Minister Responsible: Vacant
- Metropolitan Commissioner: Shri Yogesh Mhase, IAS

Pune Metropolitan Region (PMR) is the metropolitan region around the city of Pune, Maharashtra, India. According to practical purposes, PMR comprises two Municipal Corporations of PMC, PCMC and three Cantonment Boards, spread over an area of 7,256.46 km^{2}. The population of the region as per 2011 census was 7,541,946. It Contributes 80% GDP to Pune District and 9.2% GDP to Maharashtra.

The Pune Metropolitan Region Development Authority (PMRDA) is the planning and development authority of the region formed. PMRDA is headed by the Chief Minister of Maharashtra, Devendra Fadnavis. Shri Yogesh Mhase, IAS, is the Metropolitan Commissioner. The authority is responsible for various town planning schemes, ring roads as well as Pune Metro (Line 3).

== Jurisdiction ==
Pune Metropolitan Region is spread over three talukas of the Pune district. It includes the entirety of Pune City and Pimpri Chinchwad talukas, and the Dehu Road cantonment of Haveli taluka. The prominent urban local self-governing bodies in the region are as follows:

=== Municipal Corporations ===
- Pune
- Pimpri-Chinchwad

=== Cantonment Boards ===
- Pune Cantonment Board
- Khadki Cantonment Board
- Dehu Road Cantonment Board

== See also ==
- Pune Metropolitan Region Development Authority
