= Daund taluka =

- Taluka
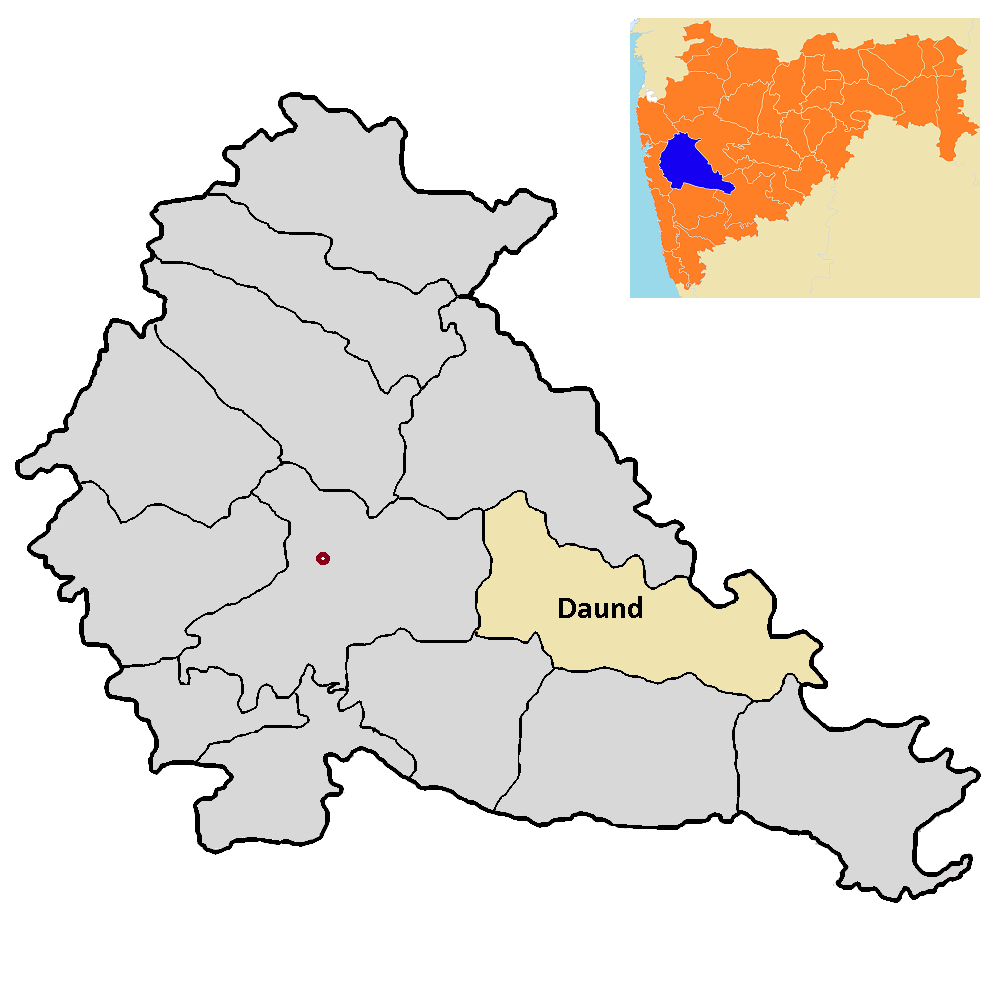
- Location of Daund in Pune district in Maharashtra
- Coordinates: 18.4631°N 74.5789°E
- Country: India
- State: Maharashtra
- District: Pune district
- Headquarters: Daund

Government
  - Lok Sabha constituency: supriya sule
  - Assembly constituency: Rahul shubhash kul

Area
  - Taluka: 1,307.85 km^{2} (504.96 sq mi)

Population (2011)
  - Taluka: 380,496
  - Density: 290.932/km^{2} (753.512/sq mi)
  - Urban: 56,313

Daund taluka is a taluka or subdivision of Pune district of the state of Maharashtra in India. The town of Daund is the only major urban area in this predominantly rural area. Daund railway station is a major railway junction. All southern railways are connected to this route, and also divided the Nagar railway to north Indian railway, like Delhi, Solapur division, Daund junction and then joined to the Pune district junction. To reach the Siddhi Vinayak Siddhatek Ganpati temple, one has to travel 14 km to Daund by road.

== Demographics ==
Daund has a population of 380,496, according to the 2011 census. Daund had a literacy rate of 79.09% and a sex ratio of 939 females per 1000 males. 46,713 (12.28%) are under 7 years of age. 56,313 (14.80%) lived in urban areas. Scheduled Castes and Scheduled Tribes make up 15.05% and 2.54% of the population respectively.

Religions in Daund taluk (2011)
Religion	Percent
Hinduism	91.05%
Islam	5.50%
Christianity	1.36%
Buddhism	1.08%
Jainism	0.59%
Other or not stated	0.42%

At the time of the 2011 Census of India, 89.52% of the population in the district spoke Marathi, 5.90% Hindi and 1.16% Telugu as their first language.

== See also ==
- List of talukas in Pune district
- Deulgaon Gada
