= Indapur taluka =

- Taluka
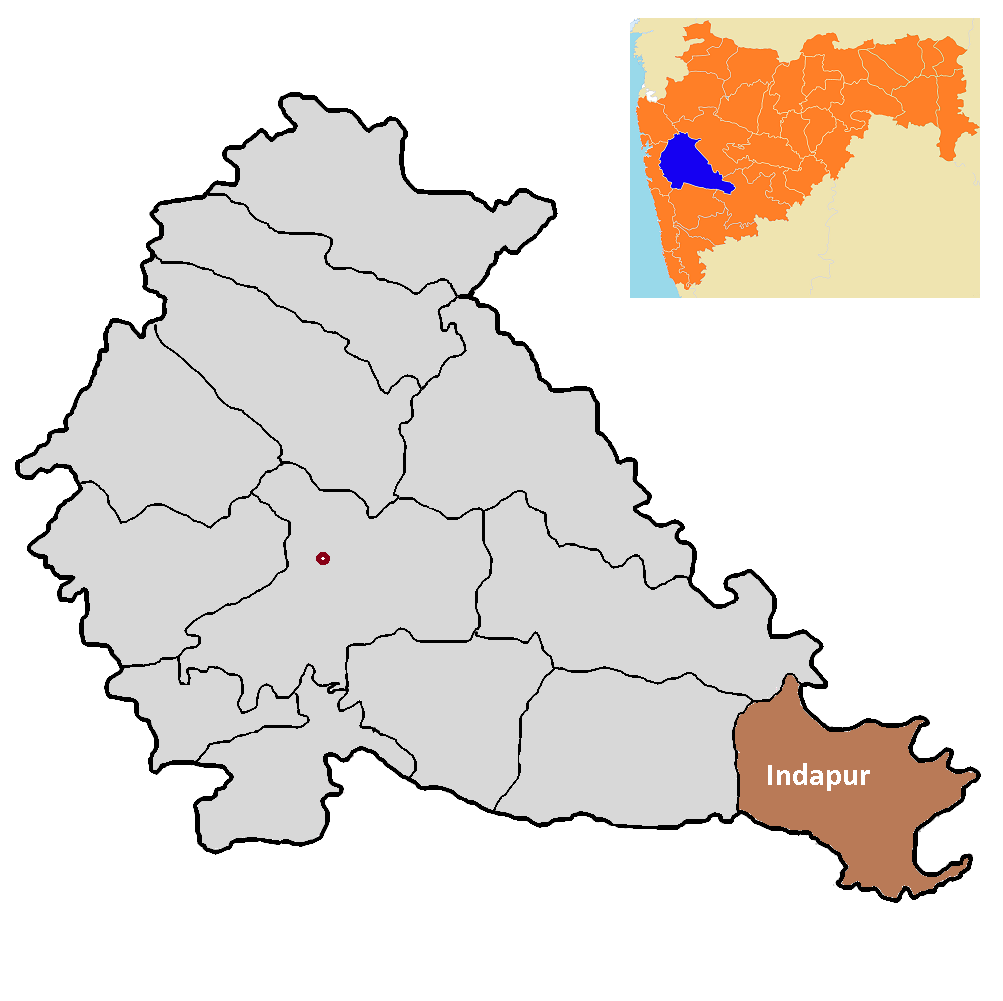
- Location of Indapur in Pune district in Maharashtra
- Coordinates: 18.1200°N 75.0300°E
- Country: India
- State: Maharashtra
- Division: Pune Division
- District: Pune district
- Sub-Division: Baramati Sub-Division
- Website: Official website

Indapur taluka is a taluka in Baramati subdivision of Pune district of state of Maharashtra in India.

== Demographics ==
Religions in Indapur taluk (2011)
Religion	Percent
Hinduism	92.83%
Islam	4.86%
Buddhism	1.24%
Jainism	0.63%
Other or not stated	0.44%

Indapur taluka has a population of 383,183 according to the 2011 census. Indapur had a literacy rate of 81.53% and a sex ratio of 927 females per 1000 males. 45,787 (11.95%) are under 7 years of age. 25,515 (6.66%) lived in urban areas. Scheduled Castes and Scheduled Tribes make up 15.94% and 1.24% of the population respectively.

Languages of Indapur taluk (2011)
1. Marathi (93.7%)
2. Hindi (4.35%)
3. Others (2.00%)

At the time of the 2011 Census of India, 93.65% of the population in the district spoke Marathi and 4.35% Hindi as their first language.

== See also ==
- Talukas in Pune district
