= Dapode =

Village in Maharashtra

- village
- Location in Maharashtra, India Dapode (India)
- Coordinates: 19.2564022°N 73.0464309°E
- Country: India
- State: Maharashtra
- District: Thane
- Taluka: Bhiwandi
- Elevation: 14 m (46 ft)

Population (2011)
  - Total: 3,026
- Time zone: UTC+5:30 (IST)
- 2011 census code: 552666

Dapode is a village in the Thane district of Maharashtra, India. It is located in the Bhiwandi taluka.

== Demographics ==
According to the 2011 census of India, Dapode has 749 households. The effective literacy rate (i.e. the literacy rate of population excluding children aged 6 and below) is 88.08%.

Demographics (2011 Census)
| | Total | Male | Female |
|---|---|---|---|
| Population | 3026 | 1785 | 1241 |
| Children aged below 6 years | 401 | 212 | 189 |
| Scheduled caste | 139 | 81 | 58 |
| Scheduled tribe | 27 | 13 | 14 |
| Literates | 2312 | 1452 | 860 |
| Workers (all) | 1371 | 1186 | 185 |
| Main workers (total) | 1278 | 1113 | 165 |
| Main workers: Cultivators | 103 | 77 | 26 |
| Main workers: Agricultural labourers | 60 | 9 | 51 |
| Main workers: Household industry workers | 23 | 17 | 6 |
| Main workers: Other | 1092 | 1010 | 82 |
| Marginal workers (total) | 93 | 73 | 20 |
| Marginal workers: Cultivators | 16 | 15 | 1 |
| Marginal workers: Agricultural labourers | 4 | 0 | 4 |
| Marginal workers: Household industry workers | 7 | 3 | 4 |
| Marginal workers: Others | 66 | 55 | 11 |
| Non-workers | 1655 | 599 | 1056 |
