= Deulgaon Gada =

Village in Maharashtra

Deulgaon Deulgaon Gada
- Village
- Location in Maharashtra Deulgaon (India)
- Country: India
- State: Maharashtra
- District: Pune

Government
  - Type: Grampanchayat

Population (2011)
  - Total: 3,051

Languages
  - Official: Marathi
- Time zone: UTC+5:30 (IST)
- PIN: 412203
- Telephone code: 02117
- Vehicle registration: MH-12

Deulgaon, commonly known as Deulgaon Gada is a village located in Daund taluka of Pune district, in state of Maharashtra, India.

== Demographics ==
As per 2011 census:

- Deulgaon Gada has 583 families residing. The village has population of 3051.
- Out of the population of 3051, 1581 are males while 1470 are females.
- Literacy rate of the village is 78.42%.
- Average sex ratio of the village is 930 females to 1000 males. Average sex ratio of Maharashtra state is 929.

== Geography, and transport ==
Distance between Deulgaon Gada, and district headquarter Pune is 64 kilometres (40 mi).
