= Haveli taluka =

Haveli Taluka
- Tehsil
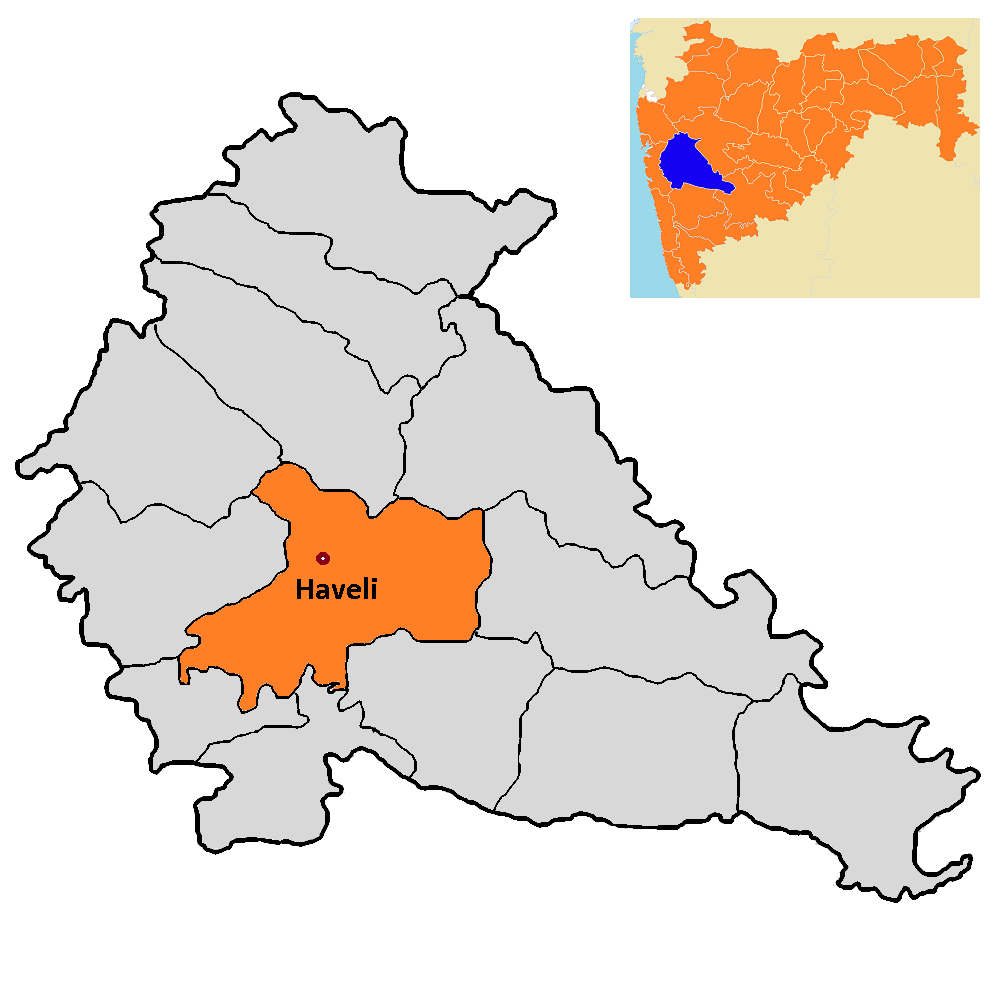
- Location of Haveli in Pune district in Maharashtra
- Coordinates: 18.5580346°N 73.890646°E
- Country: India
- State: Maharashtra
- District: Pune

Area
  - Tehsil: 1,164 km^{2} (449 sq mi)

Population (2011)
  - Tehsil: 2,435,581
  - Density: 2,092/km^{2} (5,419/sq mi)
  - Urban: 1,823,950

Taluka Haveli is a subdivision of the district of Pune, Maharashtra. The Pune Municipal Corporation & Pimpri Chinchwad Municipal Corporation, Pune are at the center of & entirely surrounded by the taluka for administrative purposes. The region of Pune Metropolitan Region has claimed the major part of the same.

== Demographics ==
Religions in Haveli taluk (2011)
Religion	Percent
Hinduism	85.89%
Islam	6.26%
Buddhism	4.49%
Christianity	1.76%
Jainism	0.93%
Other or not stated	0.67%

Haveli taluka has a population of 2,435,581 according to the 2011 census. Haveli had a literacy rate of 88.18% and a sex ratio of 850 females per 1000 males. 316,215 (12.98%) are under 7 years of age. 1,823,950 (74.89%) lived in urban areas. Scheduled Castes and Scheduled Tribes made up 15.41% and 2.08% of the population respectively.

=== Languages ===
Languages in Haveli taluk (2011)
1. Marathi (73.6%)
2. Hindi (12.9%)
3. Kannada (2.23%)
4. Telugu (1.31%)
5. Urdu (1.09%)
6. Marwari (1.08%)
7. Malayalam (0.98%)
8. Others (6.83%)

The most spoken language in the Taluka is Marathi, which is also the sole official language of the region.

At the time of the 2011 Census of India, 73.59% of the population of the taluka spoke Marathi, 12.89% Hindi, 2.23% Kannada, 1.31% Telugu, 1.09% Urdu, 1.08% Marwari and 0.98% Malayalam as their mother tongue.

== See also ==
- Talukas in Pune district
