= Purandar taluka =

- Tehsil
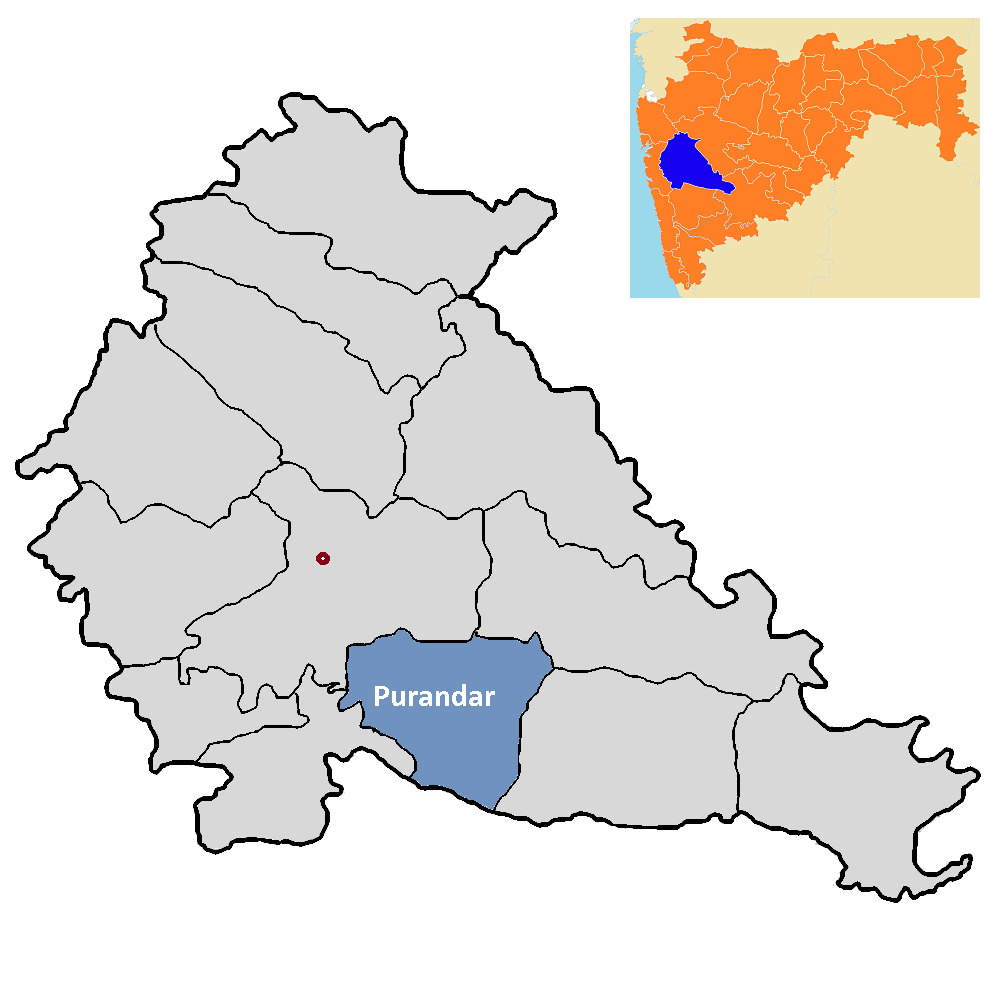
- Location of Purandar in Pune district in Maharashtra
- Country: India
- State: Maharashtra
- District: Pune district
- Headquarters: Purandar

Area
  - Total: 1,101.65 km^{2} (425.35 sq mi)

Population (2011)
  - Total: 235,659
  - Density: 213.915/km^{2} (554.036/sq mi)

Purandar taluka is a taluka of Pune district of the state of Maharashtra in India. There are 108 villages and 3 towns in Purandhar Taluka.

== Demographics ==
Religions in Purandar taluk (2011)
Religion	Percent
Hinduism	95.65%
Islam	2.60%
Buddhism	1.11%
Other or not stated	0.64%

Purandar taluka has a population of 235,659 according to the 2011 census. Purandar had a literacy rate of 82.55% and a sex ratio of 965 females per 1000 males. 25,037 (10.62%) are under 7 years of age. 57,564 (24.43%) lived in urban areas. Scheduled Castes and Scheduled Tribes make up 7.24% and 2.58% of the population respectively.

Languages of Purandar taluk (2011)
1. Marathi (95.7%)
2. Hindi (2.73%)
3. Others (1.62%)

At the time of the 2011 Census of India, 95.65% of the population in the district spoke Marathi and 2.73% Hindi as their first language.

== See also ==
- Talukas in Pune district
