= Mohangad =

Mohangad Fort
- Shirgoan (Bhor) Pune district, Maharashtra
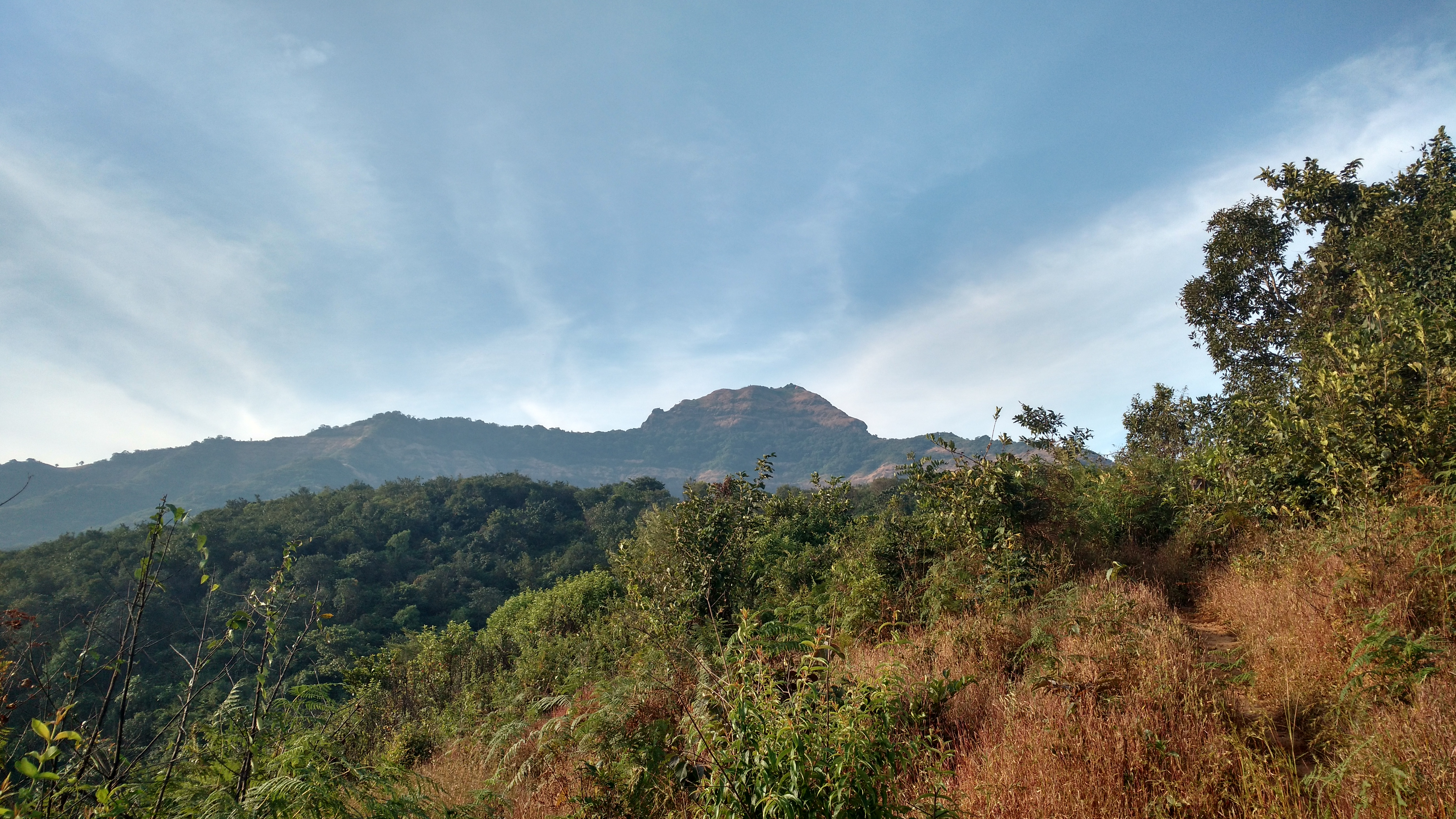
- Mohangad (janani durga)

Site information
- Type: Hill fort
- Owner: Government of India
- Open to the public: Yes
- Condition: Ruins

Location
- Shown within Maharashtra
- Coordinates: 18°04′39.1″N 73°37′14.8″E
- Height: 1100 meters

Site history
- Materials: Stone

Mohangad Fort is a ruined hill fort in Pune district, Maharashtra, India, also known as Jaslodgad. It is located at Shirgaon, near Hirdoshi village, on the road between Bhor and Mahad. The fort was described as long deserted in a letter of 1659 from Shivaji I. The existing remains include rock-cut and dressed stone steps and several rock-cut water cisterns. This fort was rebuilt by Bajiprabhu Deshpande as per instructions from Shivaji (after defeating ruler - Bandal on Rohida fort)
