= Jedhe Shakawali =

Historical document

- The starting page of The Jedhe Shakawali Pune
- Language: Marathi in Modi script
- Subject: Historical document
- Publication date: 1618–1697
- Publication place: Maratha Empire

The Jedhe Shakawali. or Jedhe Chronology, is a bare record of events from 1618 to 1697, kept by the Jedhe Deshmukhs of Kari village, near Bhor in the Pune district. It is a valuable source for the political history of the formative period of Maratha Empire. It was first edited by B.G. Tilak and published by Bharat Itihas Sanshodhak Mandal, Pune, in 1916.

== Background ==
The Jedhes, the Khopades, the Bandals and the Naik-Nimbalkars were the prominent Deshmukhs of Maval. Out of these, Jedhes of Kaari, in modern-day Bhor, were the Deshmukhs of 'Rohid Khora', which includes the forts of Raireshwar and Rohideshwar, in the Maval region of the modern Pune district, which is near Bhor about 48 km towards south of Pune. Being the leaders of their region, they were privileged persons and enjoyed a high status in political, social and economic life of the region. Kanhoji Jedhe is regarded as the real founder of the Jedhe family as he and his son Baji, popularly known as Sarjerao Jedhe, brought their family to prominence by rendering valuable services to Shivaji, the founder of Maratha Empire in the 17th century.

== Contents ==
The Jedhe Shakawali consists of yearly data from 1618 (birth of Aurangzeb) to 1697 (the besiege of the Gingee fort). The years are reckoned by the Shaka era (approximately 78 years behind anno domini), alongside a short description.

== Select events ==
(Unless specified otherwise, the dates below use Julian calendar.)

- Shaka 1540 – Kartik Vadya 1 (Saturday, 24 October 1618 ) – Birth of Aurangzeb
- Shaka 1550 (1628) – Sultan Khurram became Emperor of Delhi under the title of Shah Jehan
- Shaka 1551 – Phalgun Vadya 3 (Friday, 19 February 1630) – Birth of Shivaji at Fort Shivneri
- Shaka 1579 – Jyeshtha Shuddha 12 (14 May 1657) – A son, Sambhaji, was born to Shivaji
- Shaka 1581 – Margashirsh Shuddha 7 (Thursday, 10 November 1659) – Afzalkhan killed by Shivaji near Fort Pratapgad
- Shaka 1582 – Ashadh Vadya 1 (13 July 1660) – Shivaji escaped from fort Panhala and fled to fort Vishalgad
- Shaka 1585 – Chaitra Shuddha 8 (Sunday, 5 April 1663) – Shivaji attacked Shahiste Khan in Pune and cut off his hand.
- Shaka 1587 – Ashadh Shuddha 10 (12 June 1665) – Shivaji made peace with Jai Singh I
- Shaka 1588 – Jyeshtha Shuddha 2 (25 May 1666) – Shivaji in Aurangzeb's court
- Shaka 1588 – Shravan Vadya 12 (26–27 Aug 1666 Gregorian calendar) – Shivaji escaped from Agra
- Shaka 1596 – Jyeshtha Shuddha 12 (6 June 1674) – Shivaji ascended the throne
- Shaka 1602 – Chaitra Shuddha 15 (Saturday, 3 April 1680) – Shivaji died at fort Raigad at mid-day
- Shaka 1602 – Shravan Shuddha 5 (20 July 1680) – Sambhaji ascended the throne
- Shaka 1603 – Kartik Shuddha 13 (Sunday, 13 November 1681) – Sambhaji met rebel prince Akbar at Patshahpur.
- Shaka 1605 – Kartik Vadya 7 (1 November 1683) – Sambhaji fought with Portuguese and raised the siege of fort Banda
- Shaka 1610 – Magh Vadya 7 (Friday, 1 February 1689) Sambhaji and Kavi Kalash captured by Shaikh Nizam at Sangameshwar
- Shaka 1610 – Phalgun Vadya 30 (11 March 1689) – Aurangzeb beheaded Sambhaji and Kavi Kalash at Tulapur
- Shaka 1611 – Kartik Vadya 11 (28 October 1689) – Rajaram reached Jinji fort
