= Bhor taluka =

Coordinates: 18.145362°N 73.843060°E

- Taluka
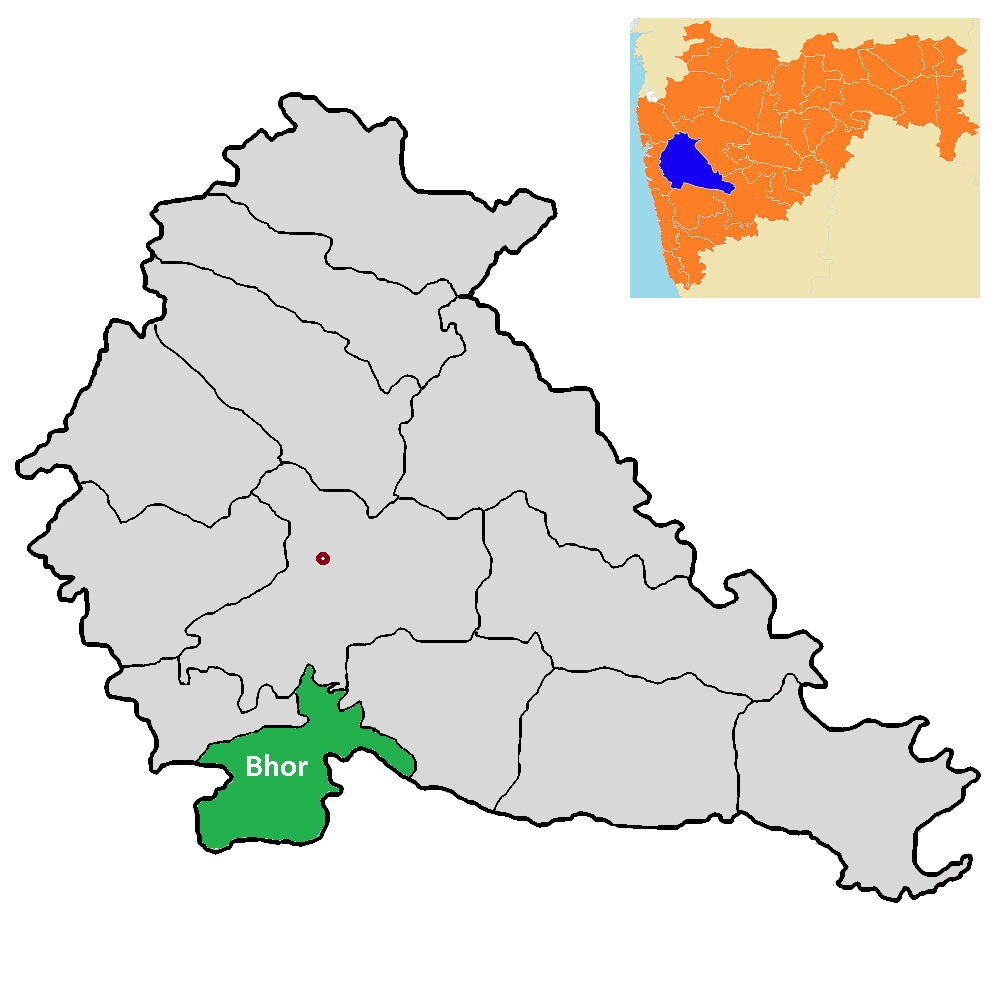
- Location of Bhor in Pune district in Maharashtra
- Country: India
- State: Maharashtra
- District: Pune district

Government
  - Assembly constituency: Bhor
  - MLA: Sangram Thopte

Area
  - Total: 860.09 km^{2} (332.08 sq mi)

Population (2011)
  - Total: 186,116
  - Density: 216.39/km^{2} (560.45/sq mi)

Bhor taluka is a taluka in Haveli subdivision of Pune district of state of Maharashtra in India. There are 195 villages and 1 town in Bhor Taluka.

== Demographics ==
Religions in Bhor taluk (2011)
Religion	Percent
Hinduism	94.15%
Buddhism	3.65%
Islam	1.78%
Other or not stated	0.42%

Bhor taluka has a population of 186,116 according to the 2011 census. Bhor had a literacy rate of 81.42% and a sex ratio of 977 females per 1000 males. 20,599 (11.07%) are under 7 years of age. 18,453 (9.91%) lived in urban areas. Scheduled Castes and Scheduled Tribes make up 5.96% and 2.91% of the population respectively.

Languages of Bhor taluk (2011)
1. Marathi (96.6%)
2. Hindi (1.88%)
3. Others (1.49%)

At the time of the 2011 Census of India, 96.63% of the population in the district spoke Marathi and 1.88% Hindi as their first language.

== See also ==
- Talukas in Pune district
