= Pune City taluka =

- Tehsil
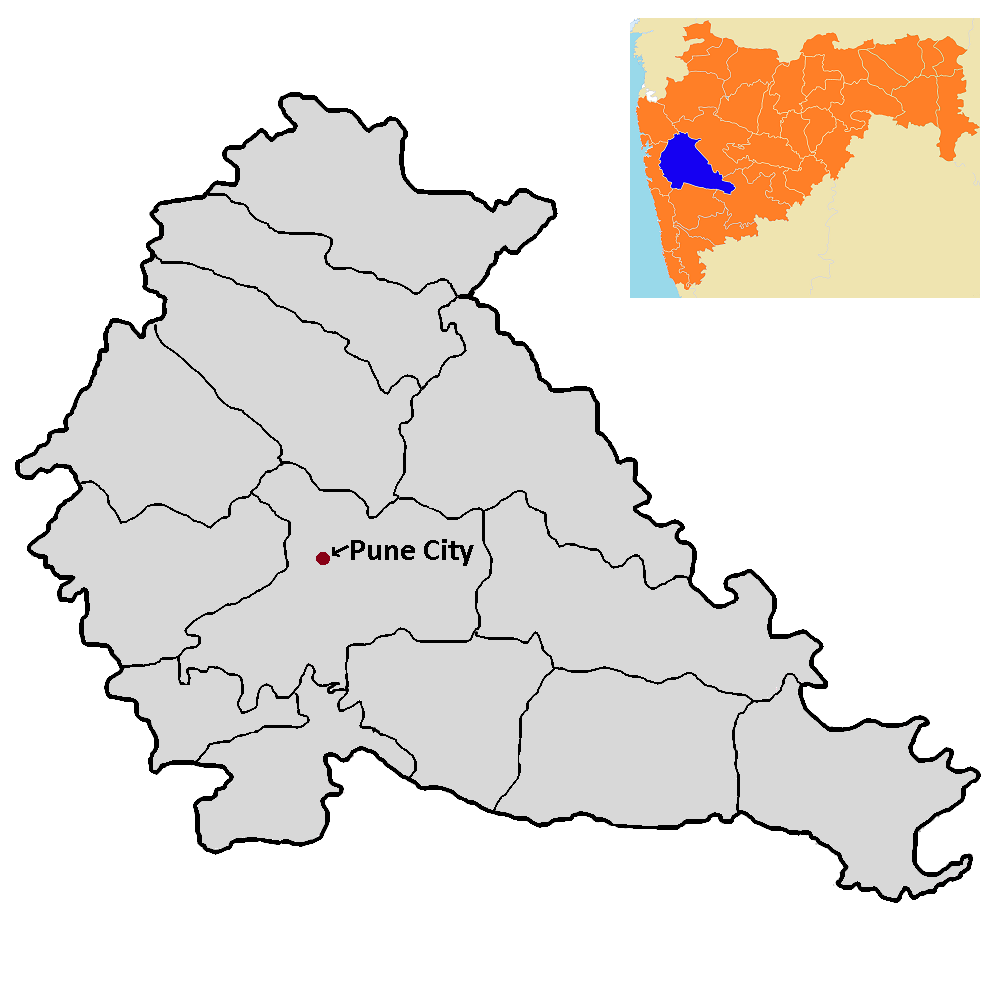
- Location of Pune City in Pune district in Maharashtra
- Country: India
- State: Maharashtra
- District: Pune district

Population (2011)
  - Total: 3,304,888

Pune City taluka is the main taluka in the Pune district of state of Maharashtra in India.

This taluka is the administrative block for the City of Pune as defined by the State of Maharashtra. The local governance of the City of Pune is governed by the Pune Municipal Corporation, while the taluka officials are appointed by the State Govt. The Pune municipal corporation cannot grow beyond the boundaries of the Pune City taluka.

== Demographics ==
Religions in Pune City taluk (2011)
| Religion | Percent |
| Hinduism | 78.80% |
| Islam | 11.30% |
| Buddhism | 4.02% |
| Jainism | 2.42% |
| Christianity | 2.37% |
| Sikhism | 0.52% |
| Other or not stated | 0.57% |

Pune City taluka has a population of 3,304,888 according to the 2011 census. Pune City had a literacy rate of 89.70% and a sex ratio of 943 females per 1000 males. 355,703 (10.76%) are under 7 years of age. 3,274,923 (99.09%) lived in urban areas. Scheduled Castes and Scheduled Tribes made up 13.51% and 1.11% of the population respectively.

Languages of Pune City taluk (2011)
1. Marathi (66.6%)
2. Hindi (13.9%)
3. Urdu (3.87%)
4. Marwari (2.54%)
5. Gujarati (2.28%)
6. Telugu (2.07%)
7. Kannada (1.92%)
8. Tamil (1.03%)
9. Others (5.84%)

At the time of the 2011 Census of India, 66.58% of the population in the district spoke Marathi, 13.87% Hindi, 3.87% Urdu, 2.54% Marwari, 2.28% Gujarati, 2.07% Telugu, 1.92% Kannada and 1.03% Tamil as their first language.
