= Velhe taluka =

Rajgad Taluka
- Tehsil
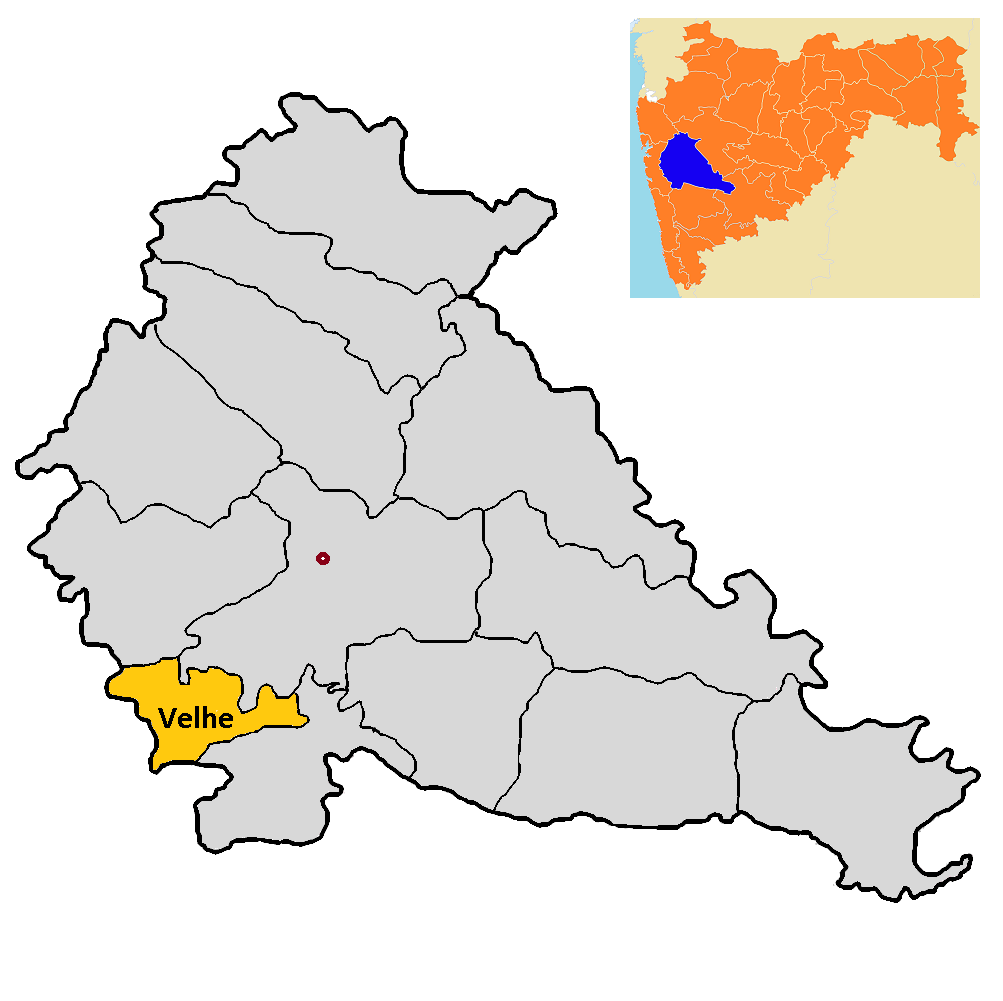
- Location of Rajgad in Pune district in Maharashtra
- State: Maharashtra
- District: Pune district

Government
  - Assembly constituency: Bhor
  - MLA: Sangram Thopte

Area
  - Total: 569.13 km^{2} (219.74 sq mi)

Population (2011)
  - Total: 54,516
  - Density: 95.788/km^{2} (248.09/sq mi)

Rajgad Taluka is a rural Taluka in the Pune district of Maharashtra, India. Formerly known as Velhe, it is part of the Bhor subdivision and consists of 130 villages.

== Demographics ==
Religions in Rajgad taluk (2011)
Religion	Percent
Hinduism	95.37%
Buddhism	3.68%
Islam	0.74%
Other or not stated	0.21%

Rajgad taluka has a population of 54,516 according to the 2011 census. Velhe had a literacy rate of 75.96% and a sex ratio of 982 females per 1000 males. 6,213 (11.40%) are under 7 years of age. Scheduled Castes and Scheduled Tribes make up 4.83% and 3.73% of the population respectively.

At the time of the 2011 Census of India, Marathi was the predominant language, spoken by 98.73% of the population as their first language.

== See also ==
- Wangani
